= List of Guggenheim Fellowships awarded in 1958 =

Three hundred and twenty-two Guggenheim Fellowships were awarded in 1958. $1,412,000 in funds was disbursed.

== 1958 U.S. and Canadian Fellows ==
Category	Field of Study	Fellow	Institutional association	Research topic	Notes	Ref
Creative Arts	Drama and Performance Art	Lionel Abel	State University of New York			
Creative Arts	Drama and Performance Art	Loften Mitchell	State University of New York at Binghamton			
Creative Arts	Fiction	Doris Betts		Novel writing		
Creative Arts	Fiction	Margaret Currier Boylen		Novel writing		
Creative Arts	Fiction	Josephine Carson Rider		Novel writing		
Creative Arts	Fiction	Daniel Curley	University of Illinois at Urbana-Champaign	Novel writing		
Creative Arts	Fiction	James Purdy		Novel writing	Also won in 1963	
Creative Arts	Fine Arts	Emil John Antonucci		Graphic design		
Creative Arts	Fine Arts	Al Blaustein	The Art Center of Northern New Jersey	Painting	Also won in 1961	
Creative Arts	Fine Arts	Dennis Byng	Purdue University	Painting	Also won in 1959	
Creative Arts	Fine Arts	Richard Charles Gilkey		Painting		
Creative Arts	Fine Arts	Paul Theodore Granlund	Minneapolis School of Art	Sculpture	Also won in 1957	
Creative Arts	Fine Arts	William A. Kienbusch		Painting		
Creative Arts	Fine Arts	James Chan Leong		Painting		
Creative Arts	Fine Arts	Ezio Martinelli	Sarah Lawrence College, Parsons School of Design	Graphic arts	Also won in 1962	
Creative Arts	Fine Arts	Dean Jackson Meeker	University of Wisconsin	Creative printmaking		
Creative Arts	Fine Arts	Tetsuo Ochikubo		Lithography		
Creative Arts	Fine Arts	Nathan Oliveira		Graphic arts		
Creative Arts	Fine Arts	Charles Robert Oscar	Museum of Modern Arts	Painting		
Creative Arts	Fine Arts	Norman Rubington				
Creative Arts	Fine Arts	Aubrey E. Schwartz	Harpur College, State University of New York	Graphic art	Also won in 1959	
Creative Arts	Fine Arts	Sahl Swarz		Sculpture	Also won in 1955	
Creative Arts	Fine Arts	Romas Viesulas		Lithography	Also won in 1964, 1969	
Creative Arts	Fine Arts	Frans Wildenhain	Rochester Institute of Technology	Ceramic sculpture in relation to architecture		
Creative Arts	Music Composition	James MacArthur Beale	University of Washington	Composing		
Creative Arts	Music Composition	Jack Hamilton Beeson	Columbia University	Composing		
Creative Arts	Music Composition	Irving Gifford Fine	Brandeis University	Composing	Also won in 1950	
Creative Arts	Music Composition	Lee Henry Hoiby		Composing		
Creative Arts	Music Composition	Stanley Hollingsworth	Oakland University	Composing		
Creative Arts	Music Composition	Teo Macero	TEO Productions	Composing	Also won in 1957	
Creative Arts	Music Composition	Vincent Persichetti	Juilliard School	Composing	Also won in 1968, 1973	
Creative Arts	Music Composition	Jerome Rosen	University of California, Davis	Composing		
Creative Arts	Photography	W. Eugene Smith	Magnum Photos	Pittsburgh	Also won in 1956, 1968	
Creative Arts	Poetry	Philip Booth	Syracuse University	Writing	Also won in 1964	
Creative Arts	Poetry	Edgar Bowers	Harpur College	Writing	Also won in 1969	
Creative Arts	Poetry	Katherine de Montalant Hoskins		Writing		
Creative Arts	Poetry	Alastair Reid		Writing	Also won in 1958	
Humanities	American Literature	James Franklin Beard, Jr.	Clark University	James Fenimore Cooper	Also won in 1952	
Humanities	American Literature	Travis Miller Bogard	University of California, Berkeley	Plays of Eugene O'Neill		
Humanities	American Literature	John Espey	University of California, Los Angeles	Critical study of the poetry of Ezra Pound		
Humanities	American Literature	Ihab Habib Hassan	Wesleyan University	American novel since World War II	Also won in 1962	
Humanities	American Literature	Alfred Kazin	Amherst College	Historical and literary studies of 20th century American writing	Also won in 1940, 1947, 1969	
Humanities	American Literature	Jacob Clavner Levenson	University of Minnesota			
Humanities	American Literature	Gardner Blake Taplin	Longwood College	Influence of Italian life and culture upon American literature in the 19th century		
Humanities	Architecture, Planning and Design	Ada Louise Huxtable	Art in America, Progressive Architecture			
Humanities	Architecture, Planning and Design	John William Reps	Cornell University	City planning prior to the Chicago World's Fair Columbian Exposition of 1893		
Humanities	Architecture, Planning and Design	Thomas D. Schocken	St. Louis City Plan Commission	Relationship between city planning controls and design in European countries		
Humanities	Bibliography	William Richard Matthews	University of California, Los Angeles	Works of Sir Thomas Malory as printed by William Caxton	Also won in 1946	
Humanities	Biography	William Johnson	Time Life	Harold Osman Kelly, 1884-1955		
Humanities	Biography	Elizabeth Stevenson		Lafcadio Hearn	Also won in 1951	
Humanities	British History	Richard Wall Lyman	Washington University in St. Louis	James Ramsay MacDonald		
Humanities	Classics	Thomas R. S. Broughton	Bryn Mawr College		Also won in 1945	
Humanities	Classics	Norman O. Brown	University of Pennsylvania, Wesleyan University	Irrational factor in ancient Greek politics		
Humanities	Classics	John Francis Callahan	Georgetown University			
Humanities	Classics	Joseph Fontenrose	University of California, Berkeley	Cults of Delphi in ancient Greece		
Humanities	Classics	Fred Walter Householder, Jr.	Indiana University	Early history of Greek language		
Humanities	Classics	Georg Hans Bhavani Luck	Harvard University	Ovid's language, style and literary technique		
Humanities	Classics	William Andrew McDonald	University of Minnesota		Also won in 1967	
Humanities	Classics	Helen F. North	Cornell University		Also won in 1975	
Humanities	Classics	Roger A. Pack	University of Michigan	Artemidorus Daldianus' Oneirocritica		
Humanities	Classics	Lawrence Richardson, Jr.	Yale University	Painters of ancient Pompeii		
Humanities	Classics	Chester G. Starr	University of Illinois at Urbana-Champaign	Early Greek civilization	Also won in 1950	
Humanities	Classics	Myra L. Uhlfelder	University of Iowa	History of ancient Roman religion		
Humanities	Classics	John Howard Young	Johns Hopkins University	Sounion in the Athenian state period		
Humanities	East Asian Studies	John Whitney Hall	University of Michigan	Okayama Domain	Also won in 1976	
Humanities	Economic History	Wytze Gorter	University of California, Los Angeles	Economic study of the dissolution of the Dutch Empire in the Far East		
Humanities	Economic History	Louis Morton Hacker	Columbia University	Early history of the United States Steel Corporation	Also won in 1948	
Humanities	Economic History	Jacob Myron Price	University of Michigan	Anglo-American tobacco trade, 1660-1775	Also won in 1965	
Humanities	English Literature	Roy Wesley Battenhouse	Indiana University	Elizabethan poetic and moral theory		
Humanities	English Literature	Gerald Eades Bentley, Jr.	University of Chicago			
Humanities	English Literature	Donald F. Bond	University of Chicago		Also won in 1966	
Humanities	English Literature	Fredson Thayer Bowers	University of Virginia	Bibliographical study of all English plays published between 1660 and 1700	Also won in 1970	
Humanities	English Literature	Jackson Irving Cope	Washington University in St. Louis	Renaissance Italian critics' influence upon Elizabethan playwrights	Also won in 1984	
Humanities	English Literature	Joseph Frank	University of Rochester	History of English newspapers	Also won in 1961	
Humanities	English Literature	William Frost	University of California, Santa Barbara		Also won in 1979	
Humanities	English Literature	David Hayman	University of Texas	Finnegans Wake		
Humanities	English Literature	John Emory Jordan	University of California, Berkeley	William Wordsworth		
Humanities	English Literature	William Rea Keast	Cornell University	Lives of the English Poets by Samuel Johnson		
Humanities	English Literature	Harry Thornton Moore	Southern Illinois University	Collected volume of D. H. Lawrence's works	Also won in 1960	
Humanities	English Literature	William R. Mueller	University of North Carolina	Literary and theological study of John Donne's sermons		
Humanities	English Literature	Stephen Maxfield Parrish	Cornell University	Poetic theory and technique of William Wordsworth	Also won in 1985	
Humanities	English Literature	Robert Torsten Petersson	Smith College	Comparative study of certain literary works and paintings of the 17th century		
Humanities	English Literature	Lawrence Vincent Ryan	Stanford University	Works of Roger Ascham, 1515-1568		
Humanities	English Literature	Grover C. Smith, Jr.	Duke University	History of contemporary English poetic drama		
Humanities	English Literature	Robert Donald Thornton	University of South Carolina			
Humanities	English Literature	Ian Pierre Watt	University of California, Berkeley	Joseph Conrad's development as a novelist	Also won in 1972	
Humanities	Fine Arts Research	François Bucher	Yale University	Antique sources of medieval art	Also won in 1966	
Humanities	Fine Arts Research	George Heard Hamilton	Yale University	History of modern painting and sculpture		
Humanities	Fine Arts Research	John Franklin Haskins	University of Pennsylvania	Thomas Jefferson	Also won in 1963	
Humanities	Fine Arts Research	Hylton Armond Thomas	University of Minnesota			
Humanities	Fine Arts Research	Martin Weinberger	New York University	Nicola Pisano and Giovanni Pisano and their relation to sculpture in the 13th and 14th centuries		
Humanities	Folklore and Popular Culture	Austin Edwin Fife	Occidental College	Cowboy songs and ballads		
Humanities	French Literature	Bruce Morrissette	Washington University in St. Louis	Alain Robbe-Grillet		
Humanities	French Literature	Marvin Mudrick	University of California, Santa Barbara			
Humanities	French Literature	Warren Ramsey	University of California, Berkeley	Symbolism in European literature		
Humanities	French Literature	Roger W. Shattuck	University of Texas	Literary works of Remy de Gourmont		
Humanities	General Nonfiction	Edwin Emery	University of Minnesota	History and development of American press associations		
Humanities	General Nonfiction	Paul G. Horgan	Santa Fe Opera	Jean-Baptiste Lamy	Also won in 1945	
Humanities	General Nonfiction	John Frederick Muehl	University of Michigan	East India Company		
Humanities	General Nonfiction	Marion Lena Starkey	University of Connecticut	History of the African Negro in the United States	Also won in 1953	
Humanities	German and East European History	Sten Gunnar Flygt	Vanderbilt University	Karl Friedrich Bahrdt		
Humanities	German and East European History	Reginald H. Phelps	Harvard University	Early evolution of the National Socialist movement in Bavaria, 1919 to 1924		
Humanities	German and Scandinavian Literature	Heinz Politzer	Oberlin College		Also won in 1966, 1974	
Humanities	German and Scandinavian Literature	Herbert William Reichert	University of North Carolina	Friedrich Nietzsche		
Humanities	German and Scandinavian Literature	Thomas Auraldo Riley	Bowdoin College	Writings of the Viennese romantics, 1808-1813		
Humanities	German and Scandinavian Literature	H. Stefan Schultz	University of Chicago			
Humanities	History of Science and Technology	Alex Berman	University of Michigan	Comparative study of hospital pharmacy in France and the United States		
Humanities	History of Science and Technology	Thomas Neville Bonner	University of Omaha	Completion of his book The Influence of German Universities on American Medicine, 1870-1914	Also won in 1964	
Humanities	Iberian and Latin American History	Woodrow Borah	University of California, Berkeley	Mexican colonial history	Also won in 1951	
Humanities	Iberian and Latin American History	Stanley J. Stein	Princeton University	The role of merchants in the Mexican independence movement, 1778-1827	Also won in 1972	
Humanities	Italian Literature	Aldo D. Scaglione	University of California, Berkeley	Italian literary history since the Renaissance		
Humanities	Linguistics	Stanley Martin Sapon	Ohio State University			
Humanities	Linguistics	Thomas A. Sebeok	Indiana University	Poetic language in folksongs	Also won in 1980	
Humanities	Linguistics	Ralph Charles Wood				
Humanities	Literary Criticism	Wylie Sypher	Simmons College	Structure in painting, architecture and sculpture to interpret forms of literature	Also won in 1949	
Humanities	Medieval Literature	Joseph Anthony Mazzeo	Cornell University	Dante and medieval culture		
Humanities	Medieval Literature	Nicholas M. Haring	Pontifical Institute of Mediaeval Studies		Also won in 1962	
Humanities	Medieval Literature	Henry David Hurst	Portsmouth Priory School	Commentaries of the Venerable Bede on the Gospels of Mark and Luke		
Humanities	Medieval Literature	William Thomas Hobdell Jackson	Columbia University		Also won in 1967	
Humanities	Medieval History	Charles Till Davis	Tulane University			
Humanities	Medieval History	Katherine Fischer Drew	Rice University	Fusion of Lombrd and Frankish institutions in Italy between the 8th and 10th centuries		
Humanities	Medieval History	Lynn Townsend White, Jr.	Mills College	Technology and social change during the European Middle Ages		
Humanities	Music Research	Putnam C. Aldrich	Stanford University	Dance rhythms of the Baroque period		
Humanities	Music Research	Joseph Wilfred Kerman	University of California, Berkeley	Italian madrigals		
Humanities	Music Research	Carl George Parrish	Vassar College	Notations employed in vocal music and instrumental tablatures of the Renaissance		
Humanities	Music Research	Milton Steinhardt	University of Kansas	Music of Jacobus Vaet	Also won in 1965	
Humanities	Music Research	Edward Arthur Lippman	Columbia University	Musical philosophy and esthetics		
Humanities	Music Research	Alfred Mann	Rutgers University	Baroque music in England and Italy		
Humanities	Near Eastern Studies	Ricardo Augusto Caminos	Brown University	History of the XXII Egyptian Dynasty		
Humanities	Near Eastern Studies	Florence Ely Day		Early Islamic art		
Humanities	Near Eastern Studies	David Noel Freedman	Western Theological Seminary	History and culture of Biblical Palestine		
Humanities	Near Eastern Studies	Judah Goldin	Jewish Theological Seminary			
Humanities	Near Eastern Studies	Jacob C. Hurewitz	Columbia University			
Humanities	Near Eastern Studies	Arthur Võõbus	Chicago Lutheran Theological Seminary	Syrian monasticism from the 2nd to the 5th century, A.D.	Also won in 1957, 1968	
Humanities	Philosophy	Rudolf Allers	Georgetown University	Political conduct		
Humanities	Philosophy	Charles Augustus Baylis	Duke University	Ethics		
Humanities	Philosophy	Arthur Child	University of California, Davis	General theory of interpretation		
Humanities	Philosophy	Philip P. Hallie	Vanderbilt University	Maine de Biran		
Humanities	Philosophy	William Thomas Jones	Pomona College	Conflict between the scientific and normative conceptions of human life		
Humanities	Philosophy	John Ladd	Brown University	Nature of reasoning in ethics		
Humanities	Philosophy	Leroy Earl Loemker	Emory University	Intellectual history of the 17th century		
Humanities	Philosophy	Israel Scheffler	Harvard University	Philosophy of language	Also won in 1972	
Humanities	Philosophy	Gregory Vlastos	Princeton University		Also won in 1950	
Humanities	Religion	Frederick A. Norwood	Garrett Biblical Institute	History of Christian religious refugees since 1500		
Humanities	Religion	Arthur Carl Piepkorn	Concordia Seminary	Bibliography of Lutheran theologians of the period 1580-1713		
Humanities	Religion	Amos Niven Wilder	Harvard University	Interpretation of early Christian imagery and myth		
Humanities	Renaissance History	Rosalie Littell Colie	Barnard College	John Locke's work and development during his Dutch sojourn	Also won in 1966	
Humanities	Renaissance History	James Hutton	Cornell University	Concept of peace in Renaissance literature		
Humanities	Renaissance History	Frederic Chapin Lane	Johns Hopkins University	Economic history of Venice		
Humanities	Slavic Literature	William Edward Harkins	Columbia University	Karel Čapek		
Humanities	Slavic Literature	George Yury Shevelov	Columbia University			
Humanities	Spanish and Portuguese Literature	Ernesto Guerra Da Cal	New York University	Eça de Queiroz		
Humanities	Spanish and Portuguese Literature	Terrence Leslie Hansen	University of California, Riverside	Spanish folklore		
Humanities	United States History	John Gilchrist Barrett	Virginia Military Institute	Civil War military operations in North Carolina		
Humanities	United States History	Lyman Henry Butterfield	Massachusetts Historical Society	Adams family in Europe, 1778-1889		
Humanities	United States History	Marion Vernon Brewington	Peabody Museum of Salem	Ship portrait painters		
Humanities	United States History	Carl Bridenbaugh	University of California, Berkeley	English ?afe in the 17th and 18th centuries	Also won in 1962, 1968	
Humanities	United States History	David Brion Davis	Cornell University	American antislavery movement		
Humanities	United States History	William S. Greever	University of Idaho	Certain social and economic aspects of the mining rushes in the west		
Humanities	United States History	Dumas Malone	University of Virginia	Thomas Jefferson	Also won in 1951	
Humanities	United States History	Ernest R. May	Harvard University	America's emergence as a great power, 1895 to 1900		
Humanities	United States History	James Mercer Merrill	Whittier College	The River War, 1861-1865		
Humanities	United States History	Ralph Ernest Morrow	Washington University in St. Louis	Role of evangelical clergy in the life of midwestern frontier in the early 19th century		
Humanities	United States History	Charles K. O'Neill		Varying stages of Kentucky neutrality during 1861 and 1862	Also won in 1959	
Humanities	United States History	Washington Platt	Yale University	Basic principles of strategic intelligence in relation to national security		
Humanities	United States History	Benjamin Arthur Quarles	Morgan State College	Role of the Negro in the American Revolutionary War		
Humanities	United States History	David Budlong Tyler	Wagner College	Wilkes Expedition		
Humanities	United States History	John William Ward	Princeton University		Also won in 1967	
Natural Sciences	Applied Mathematics	Yuan-Cheng Fung	California Institute of Technology	Thermodynamics of irreversible processes		
Natural Sciences	Applied Mathematics	Alfred Leitner	Michigan State University	Methods of solving boundary value problems		
Natural Sciences	Astronomy and Astrophysics	John Laufer	California Institute of Technology	Decay of a turbulent shear flow		
Natural Sciences	Chemistry	Joseph Frederick Bunnett	University of North Carolina	New concepts of organic chemistry		
Natural Sciences	Chemistry	Saul G. Cohen	Brandeis University	Reactions of free radicals in solution		
Natural Sciences	Chemistry	Robert E. Connick	University of California, Berkeley	Hydrolytic polymerization	Also won in 1948	
Natural Sciences	Chemistry	LeRoy Eyring	University of Iowa	Chemical reactions in the solid state		
Natural Sciences	Chemistry	David C. Grahame	Amherst College	Dielectric properties of the inner region of the electrical double layer		
Natural Sciences	Chemistry	James Steven Johnson, Jr.	Oak Ridge National Laboratory			
Natural Sciences	Chemistry	Daniel Kivelson	University of California, Los Angeles	Paramagnetic resonance studies on liquids and gases		
Natural Sciences	Chemistry	LeRoy Henry Klemm	University of Oregon	Certain organic chemical reactions		
Natural Sciences	Chemistry	Darrell Wayne Osborne	Argonne National Laboratory			
Natural Sciences	Chemistry	Stephen Prager	University of Minnesota		Also won in 1966	
Natural Sciences	Chemistry	Robert Wheaton Taft, Jr.	Pennsylvania State University	Effects of molecular structure on reactivity		
Natural Sciences	Chemistry	George Charles Turrell	Brown University	Spectroscopic studies of vibrational energy transfer behind shock waves in gases		
Natural Sciences	Chemistry	Emil Henry White	Johns Hopkins University	Certain efficient chemiluminescent reactions		
Natural Sciences	Earth Science	Harry Paul Bailey	University of California, Los Angeles	Pleistocene continental glaciation in Canada and Scandinavia		
Natural Sciences	Earth Science	Bruce Buzzell Benson	Amherst College	Studies of natural processes in the oceans		
Natural Sciences	Earth Science	Kenneth O. Emery	University of Southern California	Sediments and water movements of the Dead Sea		
Natural Sciences	Earth Science	Donald Munro Henderson	University of Illinois at Urbana-Champaign	Certain coal beds in South Wales		
Natural Sciences	Earth Science	Paul Bigelow Sears	Yale University	Pleistocene vegetation and climate in North America		
Natural Sciences	Engineering	H. Kurt Forster	University of California, Los Angeles	Heat transfer		
Natural Sciences	Engineering	Stanley H. Langer	United States Bureau of Mines	Molecular interactions		
Natural Sciences	Engineering	John W. Miles	University of California, Los Angeles	Generation of surface waves by turbulent winds	Also won in 1968	
Natural Sciences	Engineering	Paul M. Naghdi	University of Michigan	Theory of elastic-plastic solids of work-hardening materials		
Natural Sciences	Engineering	Herbert Mark Neustadt	U.S. Naval Academy		Also won in 1957	
Natural Sciences	Engineering	George Sinclair	University of Illinois at Urbana-Champaign			
Natural Sciences	Engineering	George Henry Sines, Jr.	University of California, Los Angeles	Interactions between foreign atoms and clusters of foreign atoms in metals		
Natural Sciences	Engineering	Tau-Yi Toong	Massachusetts Institute of Technology	Problems in combustion aerodynamics		
Natural Sciences	Engineering	John Roy Whinnery	University of California, Berkeley	Streams of electrons		
Natural Sciences	Geography and Environmental Studies	William Patterson Cumming	Davidson College	Discovery and exploration of the North American continent during the 16th and 17th centuries		
Natural Sciences	Mathematics	Nesmith Ankeny	Massachusetts Institute of Technology	Studies on quadratic forms		
Natural Sciences	Mathematics	Edwin Ford Beckenbach	University of California, Los Angeles	Convex and subharmonic functions		
Natural Sciences	Mathematics	Robert Creighton Buck	University of Wisconsin	Algebraic and topological properties of linear operators on function spaces		
Natural Sciences	Mathematics	Donald Allan Darling	University of Michigan	Probability theory		
Natural Sciences	Mathematics	William F. Donoghue, Jr.	University of Kansas	Theory of coercive quadratic integer-differential forms		
Natural Sciences	Mathematics	Nathan Fine	University of Pennsylvania			
Natural Sciences	Mathematics	Robert Finn	California Institute of Technology	Non-linear elliptic partial differential equations	Also won in 1965	
Natural Sciences	Mathematics	Robert Elston Fullerton	University of Maryland	Theory of continuous surfaces		
Natural Sciences	Mathematics	Frederick W. Gehring	University of Michigan	Boundary behavior of meromorphic functions		
Natural Sciences	Mathematics	Leonard Gillman	Purdue University	Theory of rings and continuous mathematical functions		
Natural Sciences	Mathematics	Morris Kline	New York University			
Natural Sciences	Medicine and Health	S. Spafford Ackerly	University of Louisville School of Medicine	Frontal lobe function in the brain		
Natural Sciences	Medicine and Health	Ellen Brown	University of California Medical Center	Physiology of small vessel circulation and temperature regulation		
Natural Sciences	Medicine and Health	David Gitlin	Harvard University Medical School	Intracellular degradation of plasma and cellular proteins		
Natural Sciences	Medicine and Health	Arnold Bernard Scheibel	University of California, Los Angeles		Also won in 1952	
Natural Sciences	Medicine and Health	Lowell Elmond White, Jr.	University of South Alabama			
Natural Sciences	Molecular and Cellular Biology	Robert Lesh Baldwin	University of Wisconsin	Thyroglobulin		
Natural Sciences	Molecular and Cellular Biology	Eric Glendinning Ball	Harvard Medical School		Also won in 1937	
Natural Sciences	Molecular and Cellular Biology	Orlin N. Biddulph	Washington State College	Movement of minerals and organic substances in plants		
Natural Sciences	Molecular and Cellular Biology	John Eldridge Cushing	University of California, Santa Barbara			
Natural Sciences	Molecular and Cellular Biology	Abraham Eisenstark	Kansas State College	Interaction of genetic material of the bacterial virus with that of the host cell		
Natural Sciences	Molecular and Cellular Biology	Walton B. Geiger	Trinity University	Enzymes linking transacetylation with transmethylation		
Natural Sciences	Molecular and Cellular Biology	Arthur Charles Giese	Stanford University	Structure of nucleons	Also won in 1946	
Natural Sciences	Molecular and Cellular Biology	Neal B. Groman	University of Washington			
Natural Sciences	Molecular and Cellular Biology	Daniel L. Kline	Yale Medical School	White blood cell physiology		
Natural Sciences	Molecular and Cellular Biology	Allen Lein	Northwestern University			
Natural Sciences	Molecular and Cellular Biology	Pauline A. Miller	Harvard Medical School	Formation of tetanus toxin in the cell	Also won in 1959	
Natural Sciences	Molecular and Cellular Biology	Joe Neilands	University of California, Berkeley	Iron metabolism		
Natural Sciences	Molecular and Cellular Biology	Edward Lawrence Powers	Argonne National Laboratory			
Natural Sciences	Molecular and Cellular Biology	Howard Harold Seliger	Johns Hopkins University			
Natural Sciences	Molecular and Cellular Biology	Helen A. Stafford	Reed College	Various aspects of plant tissues		
Natural Sciences	Molecular and Cellular Biology	Bernard S. Strauss	University of Chicago			
Natural Sciences	Molecular and Cellular Biology	J. Herbert Taylor	Florida State University			
Natural Sciences	Molecular and Cellular Biology	Robert Collett Warner	New York University			
Natural Sciences	Molecular and Cellular Biology	John Irving White	University of Maryland School of Medicine	Protein components of skeletal muscle		
Natural Sciences	Molecular and Cellular Biology	George Wolf	University of Illinois at Urbana-Champaign	Function of vitamin A in metabolism		
Natural Sciences	Molecular and Cellular Biology	Stephen Zamenhof	Columbia University			
Natural Sciences	Neuroscience	Donald Benjamin Lindsley	University of California, Los Angeles	Brain organization and behavior		
Natural Sciences	Organismic Biology and Ecology	John Maxwell Anderson	Cornell University	Digestive tract of starfish		
Natural Sciences	Organismic Biology and Ecology	Zach M. Arnold	University of California, Berkeley	Variations of plant life		
Natural Sciences	Organismic Biology and Ecology	Arthur Merton Chickering	Albion College	Taxonomy of spiders	Also won in 1957	
Natural Sciences	Organismic Biology and Ecology	Howard Ensign Evans	Cornell University	Solitary wasps	Also won in 1969	
Natural Sciences	Organismic Biology and Ecology	William Alonzo Gosline	University of Hawaii	Classification of modern bony fishes		
Natural Sciences	Organismic Biology and Ecology	George Daniel Grice, Jr.	National Marine Fisheries Service			
Natural Sciences	Organismic Biology and Ecology	William Hansel	Cornell University	Estrogenic hormone in the blood and tissues of experimental animals		
Natural Sciences	Organismic Biology and Ecology	William Stewart Hoar	University of British Columbia	Young fish		
Natural Sciences	Organismic Biology and Ecology	Howard Holtzer	University of Pennsylvania			
Natural Sciences	Organismic Biology and Ecology	Paul Louis Illg	University of Washington			
Natural Sciences	Organismic Biology and Ecology	Everett Williams Jameson, Jr.	University of California, Davis	Japanese fleas		
Natural Sciences	Organismic Biology and Ecology	Thomas Henry Manning	National Museum of Canada	Arctic research		
Natural Sciences	Organismic Biology and Ecology	Robert Baxter Platt	Emory University	Ecological studies of organisms and communities with reference to their microenvironment		
Natural Sciences	Organismic Biology and Ecology	Charles Remington	Yale University	Evolutionary processes in the lepidoptera		
Natural Sciences	Organismic Biology and Ecology	Elizabeth S. Russell	Jackson Memorial Laboratory	Physiological genetics of mammals		
Natural Sciences	Organismic Biology and Ecology	Robert van den Bosch	University of California, Riverside			
Natural Sciences	Physics	Robert Adolph Becker	University of Illinois Urbana-Champaign	Application of nuclear physics to astrophysical problems	Also won in 1959	
Natural Sciences	Physics	Lawrence C. Biedenharn, Jr.	Rice Institute	Nuclear reaction theory		
Natural Sciences	Physics	Martin M. Block	Duke University	High energy nuclear physics		
Natural Sciences	Physics	Norman Brown	University of Pennsylvania			
Natural Sciences	Physics	Lawrence Cranberg	Los Alamos Scientific Laboratory	Spin-orbit forces in nuclei		
Natural Sciences	Physics	Gordon Charles Danielson	Iowa State College			
Natural Sciences	Physics	John Gilbert Daunt	Ohio State University		Also won in 1953	
Natural Sciences	Physics	Adrianus Jacobus Dekker	University of Minnesota			
Natural Sciences	Physics	Hans Frauenfelder	University of Illinois Urbana-Champaign	Investigation of the interaction in beta and muon decay	Also won in 1972	
Natural Sciences	Physics	Claude Geoffrion	Université Laval		Also won in 1957	
Natural Sciences	Physics	Stanley S. Hanna	Argonne National Laboratory			
Natural Sciences	Physics	Robert Hofstadter	Stanford University		Also won in 1972	
Natural Sciences	Physics	Jack Marvin Hollander	University of California, Berkeley	Atomic spectroscopy	Also won in 1965	
Natural Sciences	Physics	Arthur F. Kip	University of California, Berkeley			
Natural Sciences	Physics	Martin Jesse Klein	Case Institute of Technology		Also won in 1967	
Natural Sciences	Physics	Wallace Conrad Koehler	Oak Ridge National Laboratory			
Natural Sciences	Physics	Francis Arthur Jenkins	University of California, Berkeley	Isotopes	Also won in 1932, 1947	
Natural Sciences	Physics	Leon M. Lederman	University of Chicago			
Natural Sciences	Physics	Ralph Stuart Mackay, Jr.	University of California, Berkeley, University of California Medical Center	Unobservable detail in X-ray images	Also won in 1956	
Natural Sciences	Physics	Elliott Waters Montroll	University of Maryland	Statistical mechanics of systems of interacting particles		
Natural Sciences	Physics	Franco Rasetti	Johns Hopkins University	Spectra of ionized gases		
Natural Sciences	Physics	Joseph Melvin Reynolds	Louisiana State University			
Natural Sciences	Physics	Louis D. Roberts	Oak Ridge National Laboratory			
Natural Sciences	Physics	Emilio G. Segrè	University of California, Berkeley			
Natural Sciences	Physics	Albert Silverman	Cornell University	Production of elementary particles by high energy X-rays		
Natural Sciences	Physics	John S. Toll	University of Maryland	Analytic structure of quantum field theories		
Natural Sciences	Physics	Luke Chia-Liu Yuan	Brookhaven National Laboratory	High energy interaction		
Natural Sciences	Plant Science	Henry Nathaniel Andrews	Washington University in St. Louis	Critical study of certain groups of early land plants	Also won in 1951, 1961	
Natural Sciences	Plant Science	Enrique Balech	Ministry of the Navy (Argentina)		Also won in 1957	
Natural Sciences	Plant Science	Robert Norman Goodman	University of Missouri	Antibiotically active compounds produced by higher plants		
Natural Sciences	Plant Science	Harold Franklin Heady	University of California, Berkeley	Grasslands		
Natural Sciences	Plant Science	Harvey A. Miller	Miami University	Phytogeography and ecology of the Hawaiian Hepaticae		
Natural Sciences	Plant Science	Jack Edgar Myers	University of Texas	Photosynthetic metabolism of algae		
Natural Sciences	Plant Science	James George Ross	South Dakota State College			
Natural Sciences	Plant Science	Paul Claude Silva	University of Illinois at Urbana-Champaign	Marine algae of California		
Natural Sciences	Plant Science	Oliver Fuhriman Smith	United States Department of Agriculture	Alfalfa breeding		
Natural Sciences	Plant Science	Thomas Wallace Whitaker	University of California, Davis		Also won in 1946	
Natural Sciences	Plant Science	Stephen Wilhelm	University of California, Berkeley	Fungus parasites in plants		
Natural Sciences	Plant Science	Frederick Paul Zscheile, Jr.	University of California, Davis	Bunt resistance in wheat		
Natural Sciences	Statistics	Leonard Jimmie Savage	University of Chicago		Also won in 1951, 1967	
Natural Sciences	Statistics	Herbert Solomon	Stanford University			
Social Sciences	Anthropology and Cultural Studies	Richard King Beardsley	University of Michigan	Spanish small-farm communities		
Social Sciences	Anthropology and Cultural Studies	Svend E. Frederiksen	Catholic University of America		Also won in 1957	
Social Sciences	Anthropology and Cultural Studies	Harry Hawthorn	University of British Columbia			
Social Sciences	Anthropology and Cultural Studies	Eric Wolf	University of Virginia	Cultural change and its effects among the Tyrolese peasantry		
Social Sciences	Economics	Mark Blaug	Yale University	Capital of British industry during the Industrial Revolution		
Social Sciences	Economics	Alfred Dupont Chandler, Jr.	Massachusetts Institute of Technology	Development of American business corporations		
Social Sciences	Economics	Nicholas Georgescu-Roegen	Vanderbilt University	Problems of measurability of human motivation		
Social Sciences	Economics	Edward Hastings Chamberlin	Harvard University	Theory of wages including collective bargaining and the monopoly elements in both labor and product markets		
Social Sciences	Economics	James M. Henderson	Harvard University	Natural resource utilization patterns		
Social Sciences	Economics	Holland Hunter	Haverford College			
Social Sciences	Economics	Gerald Marvin Meier	Wesleyan University	International trade and economic development in the British tropics, 1870-1914	Also won in 1957	
Social Sciences	Economics	John R. Meyer	Harvard University	Development of a behavioral theory of the American business firm		
Social Sciences	Economics	Richard E. Quandt	Princeton University			
Social Sciences	Law	Michael H. Cardozo	Cornell Law School	European international organizations in their relations with member governments		
Social Sciences	Political Science	Russell Hunt Fifield	University of Michigan	Philippine role in Asia since independence		
Social Sciences	Political Science	Stephen Denis Kertesz	University of Notre Dame	Parliamentary diplomacy in the United Nations		
Social Sciences	Political Science	Roland Young	Northwestern University		Also won in 1968	
Social Sciences	Psychology	Edward Girden	Brooklyn College	Psychokinesis	Also won in 1941	
Social Sciences	Psychology	Clarence Henry Graham	Columbia University			
Social Sciences	Psychology	Norman Guttman	Duke University	Experimental behavior		
Social Sciences	Psychology	David McClelland	Harvard University	Relationship between human motives and economic growth		
Social Sciences	Sociology	Joseph Winfield Fretz	Bethel College	Cultural interaction of a European ethnic refugee colony in Paraguay with native Paraguayans		

== 1958 Latin American and Caribbean Fellows ==
Category	Field of Study	Fellow	Institutional association	Research topic	Notes	Ref
Creative Arts	Drama and Performance Art	Errol John			Also won in 1966	
Creative Arts	Fine Arts	Marcelo Silvestre Bonevardi			Also won in 1959	
Creative Arts	Fine Arts	Armando Morales		Engraving	Also won in 1961	
Creative Arts	Fine Arts	María Luisa Pacheco		Bolivian art and landscape	Also won in 1959, 1960	
Creative Arts	Music Composition	Luis Antonio Escobar	Composing		Also won in 1959	
Creative Arts	Music Composition	Julián Orbón de Soto	Composing		Also won in 1969	
Creative Arts	Music Composition	José Serebrier	Composing		Also won in 1957	
Humanities	Architecture, Planning and Design	Teresa Gisbert de Mesa	Higher University of San Andrés		Also won in 1966	
Humanities	Architecture, Planning and Design	José de Mesa	Higher University of San Andrés		Also won in 1996	
Humanities	Linguistics	Salvador Bucca	University of Buenos Aires			
Humanities	Philosophy	Eduardo Nicol	National Autonomous University of Mexico			
Humanities	Spanish and Portuguese Literature	Emilio Carilla	National University of Tucumán			
Natural Sciences	Astronomy and Astrophysics	Guido Münch Paniagua	California Institute of Technology	Motions and spatial arrangement of interstellar gas masses	Also won in 1944, 1945	
Natural Sciences	Chemistry	Guillermo Arturo Iacobucci	University of Buenos Aires			
Natural Sciences	Chemistry	Juan Alejandro McMillan	University of Chicago			
Natural Sciences	Mathematics	Leopoldo Nachbin	University of Brazil		Also won in 1949, 1957	
Natural Sciences	Medicine and Health	Jonas Beregovich	University of Chile			
Natural Sciences	Molecular and Cellular Biology	Moisés Behar	World Health Organization			
Natural Sciences	Molecular and Cellular Biology	Adolfo Max Rothschild	Biological Institute of São Paulo	Histamine biochemistry	Also won in 1956	
Natural Sciences	Organismic Biology and Ecology	José Ignacio Borrero	University of Valle			
Natural Sciences	Organismic Biology and Ecology	Leopoldo E. Caltagirone-Zamora	La Cruz National Entomological Station		Also won in 1957	
Natural Sciences	Organismic Biology and Ecology	Germán O. Valenzuela Vera	Universidad de Caldas			
Natural Sciences	Organismic Biology and Ecology	Paulo Emílio Vanzolini	Museum of Zoology of the University of São Paulo		Also won in 1949, 1955	
Natural Sciences	Physics	Gabriel Alvial Cáceres	University of Chile			
Natural Sciences	Plant Science	Luis A. Camargo Gutiérrez	National University of Colombia		Also won in 1960	
Natural Sciences	Plant Science	Ernesto Foldats Andins	Central University of Venezuela		Also won in 1959	
Natural Sciences	Plant Science	Juan Héctor Hunziker	Ministry of Agriculture (Argentina)		Also won in 1957, 1980	
Natural Sciences	Plant Science	Oscar Kühnemann	National Institute of Industrial Technology Miguelete, Buenos Aires			
Natural Sciences	Plant Science	Jorge Eduardo Nicholson Calle				
Natural Sciences	Plant Science	Eduardo Quisumbing			Also won in 1959	
Natural Sciences	Plant Science	Jorge Helios Morello Wyler	Universidad Nacional de Tucumán		Also won in 1954, 1955	
Social Science	Anthropology and Cultural Studies	Néstor Uscátegui Mendoza	Colombian National Ethnographic Institute		Also won in 1957	

== See also ==
- Guggenheim Fellowship
- List of Guggenheim Fellowships awarded in 1957
- List of Guggenheim Fellowships awarded in 1959
