= List of Guggenheim Fellowships awarded in 1966 =

This is a list of Guggenheim Fellowships awarded in 1966. From 2001 applicants, 322 scholars and artists were chosen to share $2,277,000. University of California, Berkeley (27), Columbia University (15), and University of Pennsylvania (13) had the highest number of faculty awarded.

== 1966 United States and Canadian Fellows ==
Category	Field of Study	Fellow	Institutional association	Research topic	Notes	Ref
Creative Arts	Choreography	Paul Taylor	Paul Taylor Dance Company		Also won in 1961, 1983	
Creative Arts	Drama and Performance Art	Jack Gelber			Also won in 1963	
Creative Arts	Drama and Performance Art	Errol John		Creative writing for theatre	Also won in 1958	
Creative Arts	Drama and Performance Art	Terrence McNally		Creative writing for theatre	Also won in 1969	
Creative Arts	Fiction	Donald Barthelme		Writing		
Creative Arts	Fiction	Cecil Dawkins		Writing		
Creative Arts	Fiction	Stanley Lawrence Elkin	Washington University in St. Louis	Writing		
Creative Arts	Fiction	Jesse Hill Ford		Writing		
Creative Arts	Fiction	Tom Mayer	Instituto Allende	Writing		
Creative Arts	Fiction	Susan Sontag		Writing	Also won in 1975	
Creative Arts	Fiction	David Derek Stacton		Writing	Also won in 1960	
Creative Arts	Fine Arts	Peter Agostini		Sculpture		
Creative Arts	Fine Arts	Calvin Albert	Pratt Institute	Sculpture		
Creative Arts	Fine Arts	John S. Anderson		Sculpture	Also won in 1965	
Creative Arts	Fine Arts	Giorgio Cavallon		Painting		
Creative Arts	Fine Arts	John Angus Chamberlain	University of New Mexico	Sculpture	Also won in 1977	
Creative Arts	Fine Arts	Sherman Drexler		Painting		
Creative Arts	Fine Arts	Edward Dugmore	Pratt Institute	Painting		
Creative Arts	Fine Arts	Friedel Dzubas		Painting	Also won in 1968	
Creative Arts	Fine Arts	Eugene Feldman	University of Pennsylvania	Photo-offset lithography		
Creative Arts	Fine Arts	Frank Gallo		Sculpture		
Creative Arts	Fine Arts	Al Held	Yale University	Painting		
Creative Arts	Fine Arts	Wolf Kahn		Painting		
Creative Arts	Fine Arts	David Levine		Graphic art		
Creative Arts	Fine Arts	Sven Lukin		Painting		
Creative Arts	Fine Arts	Eleanore Mikus	Monmouth College	Painting		
Creative Arts	Fine Arts	David P. Milby	Pennsylvania State University	Painting		
Creative Arts	Fine Arts	Frank Sumio Okada	Boeing	Painting		
Creative Arts	Fine Arts	Ricardo Yrarrázaval		Painting		
Creative Arts	Music Composition	David Del Tredici		Composing		
Creative Arts	Music Composition	Robert Erickson	San Francisco Conservatory of Music	Composing		
Creative Arts	Music Composition	Morton Feldman		Composing		
Creative Arts	Music Composition	Vincent Sauter Frohne		Composing		
Creative Arts	Music Composition	Donald Harris	Ohio State University	Composing		
Creative Arts	Music Composition	Bernhard Heiden	Indiana University	Composing		
Creative Arts	Music Composition	Gerald Humel		Composing		
Creative Arts	Music Composition	Benjamin George Lees	Queens College, CUNY	Composing	Also won in 1954	
Creative Arts	Music Composition	Robert Hall Lewis	Goucher College	Composing	Also won in 1979	
Creative Arts	Music Composition	Frederic Myrow	SUNY Buffalo	Composing		
Creative Arts	Music Composition	George Perle	Queens College, CUNY	Composing	Also won in 1974	
Creative Arts	Music Composition	George Rochberg	University of Pennsylvania	Composing	Also won in 1956	
Creative Arts	Music Composition	Robert E. Ward	Juilliard School of Music	Composing	Also won in 1949, 1950	
Creative Arts	Music Composition	Hugo Weisgall	Pennsylvania State University	Composing	Also won in 1955, 1960	
Creative Arts	Music Composition	La Monte Young		Composing		
Creative Arts	Photography	Diane Arbus		"American Rites, Manners and Customs" project	Also won in 1963	
Creative Arts	Photography	Paul Caponigro		Stone edifices in Ireland and England	Also won in 1975	
Creative Arts	Photography	William Gedney		Studies of American life (posthumously published as A Time of Youth, 2021)		
Creative Arts	Photography	Ray K. Metzker	Philadelphia College of Art		Also won in 1979	
Creative Arts	Photography	Aaron H. Siskind	Illinois Institute of Technology			
Creative Arts	Photography	David Vestal	New York Institute of Photography		Also won in 1973	
Creative Arts	Poetry	A. R. Ammons	Cornell University	Writing		
Creative Arts	Poetry	John Berryman	University of Minnesota	Writing	Won for biography in 1952	
Creative Arts	Poetry	J. V. Cunningham	Brandeis University	Writing	Also won in 1959	
Creative Arts	Poetry	Donald Finkel	Washington University in St. Louis	Writing		
Creative Arts	Poetry	Richard Howard		Writing		
Creative Arts	Poetry	William E. Stafford	Lewis & Clark College	Writing		
Creative Arts	Theatre Arts	Harry Gilbert Carlson	University of Georgia	Evolution of Swedish theater as a cultural institution		
Creative Arts	Theatre Arts	David Mayer III	Lawrence University	English pantomime from 1806 to 1846		
Humanities	American Literature	C. Hugh Holman	University of North Carolina, Chapel Hill	William Gilmore Sims		
Humanities	American Literature	R. W. B. Lewis	Yale University	Biography of Edith Wharton	Also won in 1975	
Humanities	American Literature	Jay Martin	Yale University	Biographical and critical study of Nathaniel West		
Humanities	American Literature	N. Scott Momaday	University of California, Santa Barbara	Resistance poets		
Humanities	American Literature	Willard Thorp	Princeton University	Social content of American fiction from the beginnings through 1865		
Humanities	Architecture, Planning and Design	Robert Damora				
Humanities	Architecture, Planning and Design	Edward Frank				
Humanities	Architecture, Planning and Design	Taylor M. Potter	United Presbyterian Church of the United States	Christian worship and its expression through architecture		
Humanities	Architecture, Planning and Design	Frank J. Tysen	Institute of Public Administration	Urban ugliness		
Humanities	Bibliography	Ruth Mortimer	Harvard College Library	Descriptive catalogue of Italian 16th century illustrated books in the Harvard College Library		
Humanities	Bibliography	Lawrence Clark Powell	University of California, Los Angeles	Survey of books on California, emphasizing the influence of landscape on literature	Also won in 1950	
Humanities	Biography	Irving H. Bartlett	Carnegie Institute of Technology	Daniel Webster		
Humanities	Biography	Frank Brady	Pennsylvania State University			
Humanities	Biography	Peter Burchard				
Humanities	Biography	Eleanor Flexner		Biography of Mary Wollstonecraft		
Humanities	British History	F. David Roberts	Dartmouth College			
Humanities	British History	Peter D. Stansky	Stanford University		Also won in 1973	
Humanities	Classics	Milton V. Anastos (el)	University of California, Los Angeles	Intellectual history of the Byzantine Empire	Also won in 1954	
Humanities	Classics	John Kinloch Anderson	University of California, Berkeley	Greek military history in the time of Xenophon		
Humanities	Classics	Sterling Dow	Harvard University	Studies in Greece in antiquity	Also won in 1934, 1959	
Humanities	Classics	Michael C. J. Putnam	Brown University			
Humanities	Classics	Thomas G. Rosenmeyer	University of California, Berkeley		Also won in 1982	
Humanities	East Asian Studies	Tse-tsung Chow	University of Wisconsin–Madison			
Humanities	Economic History	John M. Day	Tel Aviv University			
Humanities	Economic History	Charlotte J. Erickson	London School of Economics			
Humanities	Economic History	William Nelson Parker	Yale University	Changes in American agriculture, 1840-1910		
Humanities	Economic History	Theodore Saloutos	University of California, Los Angeles	History of the American farmer and the New Deal		
Humanities	English Literature	Robert B. Alter	Columbia University		Also won in 1978	
Humanities	English Literature	Lloyd E. Berry	University of Illinois, Urbana	Edition of the works of Thomas Elyot		
Humanities	English Literature	Donald F. Bond	University of Chicago		Also won in 1958	
Humanities	English Literature	Jack P. Dalton	SUNY Buffalo	Completion of an edition of 66 notebooks used by James Joyce in the composition of Finnegans Wake	Also won in 1964	
Humanities	English Literature	George Siemers Fayen, Jr.	Yale University	Study of Thomas Hardy's notebooks		
Humanities	English Literature	Edgar Johnson	City College of New York		Also won in 1956	
Humanities	English Literature	Francis Russell Hart	University of Virginia	Modern Scottish novel		
Humanities	English Literature	Joyce Hemlow	McGill University		Also won in 1951, 1960	
Humanities	English Literature	Herbert Howarth	University of Pennsylvania	English writers		
Humanities	English Literature	Maurice Kelley	Princeton University	Edition of Milton's Christian Doctrine		
Humanities	English Literature	Louis A. Landa	Princeton University	Economic ideas in 18th-century literature	Also won in 1946	
Humanities	English Literature	John Loftis, Jr.	Stanford University	Anglo-Spanish dramatic relations in the later 17th century		
Humanities	English Literature	Ralph Noel Maud	Simon Fraser University	Research for an edition of the unpublished writings of Dylan Thomas		
Humanities	English Literature	Clarence H. Miller	St. Louis University	Edition of St. Thomas More's Expositio Passionis		
Humanities	English Literature	Robert L. Peters	University of California, Riverside			
Humanities	English Literature	Thomas C. Pinney	Pomona College	Collected letters of Thomas Babington Macaulay	Also won in 1984	
Humanities	English Literature	Irene Samuel	Hunter College	John Milton's theory of literary criticism		
Humanities	English Literature	Charles A. Ryskamp	Princeton University	Complete edition of the letters of William Cowper		
Humanities	English Literature	Aileen Ward	Brandeis University			
Humanities	Fine Arts Research	Klaus Berger	University of Kansas	Japanese sources of European paintings, 1860–1910		
Humanities	Fine Arts Research	Dietrich von Bothmer	Metropolitan Museum of Art			
Humanities	Fine Arts Research	François Bucher	Yale University	Gothic architecture in the light of a newly discovered 15th-century sketchbook	Also won in 1958	
Humanities	Fine Arts Research	Malcolm John Campbell	University of Pennsylvania	Art patronage of the Medici		
Humanities	Fine Arts Research	Albert Elsen	Indiana University	Origin and evolution of modern sculpture, 1890–1920		
Humanities	Fine Arts Research	Julius S. Held	Barnard College	catalogue raissone of the oil sketches of Pieter Paul Rubens	Also won in 1952	
Humanities	Fine Arts Research	Juergen Schulz	University of California, Berkeley	Topographical history of Venice		
Humanities	Folklore and Popular Culture	Alan Dundes	University of California, Berkeley	History of folk narrative scholarship		
Humanities	Folklore and Popular Culture	Holger O. Nygard	Duke University			
Humanities	Folklore and Popular Culture	Felix J. Oinas	Indiana University	Slavic and Balto-Finnic folklore	Also won in 1961	
Humanities	Folklore and Popular Culture	Warren E. Roberts	Indiana University	Comparison of folk architecture in Northern Europe and the United States		
Humanities	French History	Edward T. Gargan	Wesleyan University	History of French thought from 1860 to 1990		
Humanities	French History	Ernest John Knapton	Wheaton College			
Humanities	French History	John Baptist Wolf	University of Minnesota	Completion of a biography of Louis XIV of France	Also won in 1959	
Humanities	French Literature	Olga Bernal	Vassar College			
Humanities	French Literature	Raymond Federman	SUNY Buffalo	Establishing new trends in French poetry, 1945-1965		
Humanities	French Literature	René Girard	Johns Hopkins University	Studies of Andre Malraux, Albert Camus, and Jean-Paul Sartre	Also won in 1959	
Humanities	French Literature	John Clarke Lapp	Stanford University	Jean de La Fontaine's Tales	Also won in 1973	
Humanities	French Literature	Robert James Nelson	University of Pennsylvania	Jean Rotrou		
Humanities	General Nonfiction	Constantine FitzGibbon				
Humanities	German and East European History	Klaus Epstein	Brown University			
Humanities	German and East European History	Otto Pflanze	University of Minnesota, Minneapolis	Bismarck and the consolidation of the German Reich, 1871-1890		
Humanities	German and East European History	Stanford Jay Shaw	University of California, Los Angeles			
Humanities	German and Scandinavian Literature	Adolf D. Klarmann	University of Pennsylvania	History of modern German drama		
Humanities	German and Scandinavian Literature	Gerald Gillespie	Harpur College	German poetry		
Humanities	German and Scandinavian Literature	Victor Lange	Princeton University	Development of the German novel in the 18th century	Also won in 1950	
Humanities	German and Scandinavian Literature	Burton E. Pike	Cornell University	Thematic works of Thomas Mann		
Humanities	German and Scandinavian Literature	Heinz Politzer	University of California, Berkeley	Literary history of Austria, 1789–1918	Also won in 1958, 1974	
Humanities	History of Science and Technology	John Colton Greene	University of Kansas	American science in the age of Thomas Jefferson		
Humanities	Italian Literature	Dante Della Terza	Harvard University	Development of Torquato Tasso's poetry		
Humanities	Italian Literature	Luciano Rebay	Columbia University			
Humanities	Italian Literature	Richard Allen Webster	University of California, Berkeley	Transition from parliamentary democracy to fascism in Italy, 1911–1915		
Humanities	Italian Literature	Frank Roy Willis	University of California, Davis			
Humanities	Linguistics	Yakov Malkiel	University of California, Berkeley	Theoretical linguistics	Also won in 1948, 1959	
Humanities	Linguistics	Herbert Penzl	University of California, Berkeley	Phonemic structures of the dialects in four major Old High German texts		
Humanities	Literary Criticism	Karl Kroeber	University of Wisconsin, Madison			
Humanities	Literary Criticism	Peter L. Thorslev, Jr.	University of California, Los Angeles	Free will and determinism in the romantic period		
Humanities	Literary Criticism	René Wellek	Yale University	Completion of a history of modern criticism	Also won in 1951, 1952, 1956	
Humanities	Medieval History	Walter H. Principe	St. Michael's College, University of Toronto			
Humanities	Medieval Literature	Alfred David	Indiana University	Preparation of an edition of Chaucer's short poems and The Romaunt of the Rose		
Humanities	Medieval Literature	Martin Stevens	Ohio State University			
Humanities	Music Research	David D. Boyden	University of California, Berkeley	History of violin playing	Also won in 1954, 1970	
Humanities	Music Research	George John Buelow	New York University			
Humanities	Music Research	Friedrich von Huene		Comparative study of historical woodwinds		
Humanities	Music Research	Owen Jander	Wellesley College			
Humanities	Music Research	Janet E. Knapp	Boston University	Latin poetry in the musical liturgies of the 11th and 12th centuries		
Humanities	Music Research	Leonard D. Stein	Claremont Graduate School	Creative processes of the manuscripts of Schoenberg		
Humanities	Near Eastern Studies	Hans Goedicke	Johns Hopkins University	Edition of inscriptions and documents pertaining to the history of ancient Egypt		
Humanities	Near Eastern Studies	Norman Golb	University of Chicago		Also won in 1964	
Humanities	Near Eastern Studies	Howard Clark Kee	Drew University			
Humanities	Near Eastern Studies	George Makdisi	University of Michigan		Also won in 1957	
Humanities	Near Eastern Studies	Joan L. L. Oates	University of Cambridge	Archaeological survey in Mandali, Iraq and between Mandali and Badra		
Humanities	Near Eastern Studies	Hisham B. Sharabi	Georgetown University			
Humanities	Linguistics	Haim Blanc	Hebrew University			
Humanities	Philosophy	Isaac Levi	Western Reserve University	Positive and normative aspects of the concept of rationality		
Humanities	Philosophy	Thomas Nagel	University of California, Berkeley	Motivational basis of ethics		
Humanities	Philosophy	David S. Shwayder	University of California, Berkeley	Philosophy of language		
Humanities	Philosophy	William Walker Tait, III	University of Illinois, Chicago Circle			
Humanities	Philosophy	James Jerome Walsh	Columbia University			
Humanities	Religion	William David Davies	Union Theological Seminary		Also won in 1960	
Humanities	Religion	Van A. Harvey	Southern Methodist University	Ethics of belief in 19th-century religious thought	Also won in 1971	
Humanities	Renaissance History	Rosalie Littell Colie	University of Iowa	Life and works of Hugo Grotius	Also won in 1958	
Humanities	Renaissance History	Frank Manley	Emory University	Preparation of an edition of St. Thomas More's Dyalogue of Comforte	Also won in 1978	
Humanities	Spanish and Portuguese Literature	Samuel Gordon Armistead	University of California, Los Angeles	Prose versions of La Gesta de las Mocedades del Cid	Also won in 1971	
Humanities	Spanish and Portuguese Literature	Diego Catalán	University of California, Berkeley	13th and 14th century Spanish historiography		
Humanities	Spanish and Portuguese Literature	Ramón Martínez López	University of Texas, Austin	Lexicological studies of the prose works of Alfonso X		
Humanities	Spanish and Portuguese Literature	Philip W. Silver	Oberlin College	Contemporary Spanish poetry		
Humanities	Spanish and Portuguese Literature	Iris Milagros Zavala	Universidad de Puerto Rico			
Humanities	United States History	Kenneth Kyle Bailey	Texas Western College	Southern white Protestantism in the 19th century		
Humanities	United States History	Richard S. Dunn	University of Pennsylvania	Comparative history of the English Colonies in America		
Humanities	United States History	Peter Gay	Columbia University		Also won 1977	
Humanities	United States History	Stanley P. Hirshson	Queens College, CUNY			
Humanities	United States History	Richard Hofstadter		The Progressive Historians: Turner, Beard, Parrington (published 1968)		
Humanities	United States History	Winthrop D. Jordan	University of California, Berkeley	Transformation of American social values, 1730-1790		
Humanities	United States History	Alvin M. Josephy, Jr.				
Humanities	United States History	Gabriel Morris Kolko	University of Pennsylvania	United States foreign policy between 1944 and 1956		
Humanities	United States History	Robert A. Skotheim	Wayne State University	American reaction to the idea of European totalitarianism		
Humanities	United States History	John Edward Sunder	University of Texas at Austin	Conservation of natural resources in the trans-Mississippi west from 1800 to 1865		
Humanities	United States History	James Harvey Young	Emory University	History of the Food and Drug Administration		
Natural Sciences	Applied Mathematics	Cathleen S. Morawetz	New York University		Also won 1978	
Natural Sciences	Applied Mathematics	Hiroshi Sato	Ford Motor Company	Relationship between crystal and electronic structures in transition metal alloys		
Natural Sciences	Applied Mathematics	Aaron D. Wyner				
Natural Sciences	Applied Mathematics	George Zames	Massachusetts Institute of Technology			
Natural Sciences	Astronomy and Astrophysics	David Bodansky	University of Washington		Also won 1974	
Natural Sciences	Astronomy and Astrophysics	Jack Stanley Goldstein	Brandeis University	Work at the astrophysics lab at the University of Rome		
Natural Sciences	Astronomy and Astrophysics	Robert A. Gross	Columbia University			
Natural Sciences	Astronomy and Astrophysics	William M. Protheroe	University of Pennsylvania	Photometry of eclipsing binary stars in the southern hemisphere		
Natural Sciences	Chemistry	Leland C. Allen	Princeton University	Electronic structure theory of large molecules	Also won in 1967	
Natural Sciences	Chemistry	Irving A. Breger	U.S. Geological Survey	Chemical structure of coal		
Natural Sciences	Chemistry	Thomas A. Carlson	Oak Ridge National Laboratory	Atomic consequences of radioactive decay		
Natural Sciences	Chemistry	Howard H. Claassen	Wheaton College	Reactive inorganic fluorides		
Natural Sciences	Chemistry	James W. Cobble	Purdue University	Thermodynamic properties and the oxidation states of the chemical elements in aqueous solutions		
Natural Sciences	Chemistry	Larry A. Haskin	University of Wisconsin, Madison			
Natural Sciences	Chemistry	James Lynn Hoard	Cornell University	Structures of coordination complexes of biological interest	Also won in 1946, 1960	
Natural Sciences	Chemistry	Stephen Prager	University of Minnesota	Flow of gases at low pressures	Also won in 1958	
Natural Sciences	Chemistry	William H. Reinmuth	Columbia University			
Natural Sciences	Chemistry	Dean Wentworth Robinson	Johns Hopkins University	Spectra and electronic structure of some first-period diatomic molecules		
Natural Sciences	Chemistry	Klaus Ruedenberg	Iowa State University	Quantum chemistry and molecular physics		
Natural Sciences	Chemistry	Joseph Silverman	University of Maryland, College Park	Radiation chemistry of polymers		
Natural Sciences	Chemistry	Charles Frederick Wilcox, Jr.	Cornell University	Theoretical organic chemistry		
Natural Sciences	Computer Science	George L. Turin	University of California, Berkeley	Statistical communication theory		
Natural Sciences	Earth Science	Hubert Lloyd Barnes	Pennsylvania State University			
Natural Sciences	Earth Science	William B. N. Berry	University of California, Berkeley	Distribution and phylogeny of Siluarian graptolites in Europe		
Natural Sciences	Earth Science	Gerhard Oertel	University of California, Los Angeles	Mechanism of shear fracture in rocks with slaty cleavage		
Natural Sciences	Earth Science	Philip Moore Orville	Yale University	North American-Eurasian ornithopod dinosaurs ad early cretaceous faunas		
Natural Sciences	Earth Science	John H. Ostrom	Yale University			
Natural Sciences	Earth Science	George Veronis	Massachusetts Institute of Technology	Work at the International Institute of Meteorology in Stockholm	Also won in 1959	
Natural Sciences	Engineering	Hal O. Anger	University of California, Berkeley	Radioisotope cameras in medical diagnosis		
Natural Sciences	Engineering	S. George Bankoff	Northwestern University			
Natural Sciences	Engineering	Alvin W. Trivelpiece	University of California, Berkeley	Mechanisms generating turbulence in hot and cold plasmas		
Natural Sciences	Engineering	Peter E. Wagner	Johns Hopkins University	Phonon avalanches in paramagnetic salts		
Natural Sciences	Engineering	Robert Clark Wentworth	Lockheed Missiles and Space Company	Magnetic vibrations		
Natural Sciences	Engineering	Donald Roger Willis	University of California, Berkeley	Theory of the flow of rarefied polyatomic gases		
Natural Sciences	Mathematics	Felix Browder	University of Chicago		Also won in 1953	
Natural Sciences	Mathematics	Shiing-Shen Chern	University of Chicago	Nonlinear partial differential equations arising from geometrical problems	Also won in 1954	
Natural Sciences	Mathematics	Avner Friedman	Northwestern University			
Natural Sciences	Mathematics	Paul Roesel Garabedian	Courant Institute of Mathematical Sciences		Also won 1981	
Natural Sciences	Mathematics	James Allister Jenkins	Washington University in St. Louis	Geometric studies in the theory of univalent functions		
Natural Sciences	Mathematics	Louis Nirenberg	New York University		Also won 1975	
Natural Sciences	Mathematics	Gerald Enoch Sacks	Cornell University	Axioms of recursion theory		
Natural Sciences	Mathematics	Robert Lawson Vaught	University of California, Berkeley	Foundations of mathematics		
Natural Sciences	Medicine and Health	Philip Aisen	Mount Sinai Hospital	Anion binding properties of transferrin		
Natural Sciences	Medicine and Health	Philip S. Chen, Jr.	University of Rochester	Calcium transport across living membranes		
Natural Sciences	Medicine and Health	Robert M. Epstein	Columbia University			
Natural Sciences	Medicine and Health	Attallah Kappas	University of Chicago			
Natural Sciences	Medicine and Health	Alfred F. Michael, Jr.	University of Minnesota Medical School	Biochemical nature and development of cell membranes		
Natural Sciences	Medicine and Health	Malcolm R. Miller	University of California Medical Center		Also won in 1955	
Natural Sciences	Medicine and Health	David Schachter	Columbia University College of Physicians and Surgeons			
Natural Sciences	Medicine and Health	Andrew G. Szent-Győrgyi	Dartmouth Medical School			
Natural Sciences	Medicine and Health	Lewis William Wannamaker	University of Minnesota	Biology of streptococci		
Natural Sciences	Molecular and Cellular Biology	Daniel E. Atkinson	University of California, Los Angeles	Theoretical and experimental studies on metabolic regulation		
Natural Sciences	Molecular and Cellular Biology	Sterling Chaykin	University of California, Davis			
Natural Sciences	Molecular and Cellular Biology	R. David Cole	University of California, Berkeley	Fundamental aspects of protein chemistry		
Natural Sciences	Molecular and Cellular Biology	Eugene Goldwasser	University of Chicago			
Natural Sciences	Molecular and Cellular Biology	Corwin Hansch	Pomona College		Also won in 1952	
Natural Sciences	Molecular and Cellular Biology	Edwin G. Krebs	University of Washington			
Natural Sciences	Molecular and Cellular Biology	Donald B. McCormick	Cornell University	Mechanisms of action of the flavoproteins		
Natural Sciences	Molecular and Cellular Biology	Matthew Meselson	Harvard University			
Natural Sciences	Molecular and Cellular Biology	Alwin M. Pappenheimer, Jr.	Harvard University			
Natural Sciences	Molecular and Cellular Biology	Russell Ross	University of Washington			
Natural Sciences	Molecular and Cellular Biology	Irwin William Sherman	University of California, Riverside	Research at the Carlsberg Biologic Institute in Copenhagen		f
Natural Sciences	Molecular and Cellular Biology	Peter H. Tsao	University of California, Riverside			
Natural Sciences	Molecular and Cellular Biology	Milton Zaitlin	University of Arizona	Mutants of the tobacco mosaic virus		
Natural Sciences	Organismic Biology and Ecology	Clifford O. Berg	Cornell University	Ecology of the snail-killing flies of South America		
Natural Sciences	Organismic Biology and Ecology	Arthur Barclay Chapman	University of Wisconsin–Madison			
Natural Sciences	Organismic Biology and Ecology	José Henrique Guimarães	Secretariat of Agriculture of the State of São Paulo	Etymology		
Natural Sciences	Organismic Biology and Ecology	Frederic W. Hill	University of California, Davis			
Natural Sciences	Organismic Biology and Ecology	DeForest Mellon, Jr.	University of Virginia	Sensory processes of insect feeding regulation		
Natural Sciences	Organismic Biology and Ecology	Charles Duncan Michener	University of Kansas	Behavior of primitive social bees in Africa	Also won in 1955	
Natural Sciences	Organismic Biology and Ecology	William Wright Milstead	University of Missouri, Kansas City	American box turtles		
Natural Sciences	Organismic Biology and Ecology	Francis John Rolle	Universidad de Puerto Rico	West Indian thrushes (Miocichla (Aves))		
Natural Sciences	Organismic Biology and Ecology	Evert I. Schlinger	University of California, Berkeley	Acrocerid flies in Chile		
Natural Sciences	Organismic Biology and Ecology	Marcus Singer	Western Reserve University School of Medicine			
Natural Sciences	Physics	Ansel C. Anderson	University of Illinois at Urbana-Champaign			
Natural Sciences	Physics	Walter E. Bron	IBM Research Center			
Natural Sciences	Physics	William Chinowsky	University of California, Berkeley	Elementary particle interactions	Also won 1978	
Natural Sciences	Physics	Stanley Deser	Brandeis University	Research at Sorbonne		
Natural Sciences	Physics	Richard Diamond	Lawrence Radiation Laboratory	Nuclear structure		
Natural Sciences	Physics	Joseph Francis Dillon, Jr.				
Natural Sciences	Physics	Young B. Kim	Bell Telephone Laboratory	Superconductivity		
Natural Sciences	Physics	Donald Newton Langenberg	University of Pennsylvania	Electronic structure of metals		
Natural Sciences	Physics	David M. Lee	Cornell University	Thermodynamics of solid and liquid helium	Also won 1974	
Natural Sciences	Physics	Tsung-Dao Lee	Columbia University			
Natural Sciences	Physics	Marshall Luban	University of Pennsylvania	Theory of the properties of liquid helium four		
Natural Sciences	Physics	Malcolm Harris Macfarlane	Argonne National Laboratory	Research at Oxford University		
Natural Sciences	Physics	Earl W. McDaniel	Georgia Institute of Technology	Theory of atomic collision phenomena		
Natural Sciences	Physics	Lewis Harold Nosanow	University of Minnesota, Minneapolis	Theory of the properties of quantum crystals		
Natural Sciences	Physics	Susumu Okubo	University of Rochester	Elementary particle physics		
Natural Sciences	Physics	Henry Primakoff	University of Pennsylvania	Junction of nuclear and elementary particle physics		
Natural Sciences	Physics	J. Robert Schrieffer	University of Pennsylvania	Correlation effects in relation to magnetic states in metal		
Natural Sciences	Physics	Glen A. Slack	General Electric Research Laboratory			
Natural Sciences	Physics	Prem Prakash Srivastava	Brazilian Center for Research in Physics, Rio de Janeiro			
Natural Sciences	Physics	Harold K. Ticho	University of California, Los Angeles	Elementary particle physics	Also won in 1973	
Natural Sciences	Physics	Ahmed R. Frank Wazzan	University of California, Los Angeles	Magnetism in solids		
Natural Sciences	Physics	Wolfgang Lothar Wiese	National Bureau of Standards			
Natural Sciences	Physics	Emil Wolf	University of Rochester	Coherence phenomena in modern optical physics		
Natural Sciences	Physics	Charles Zemach	University of California, Berkeley	Theory of elementary particle physics		
Natural Sciences	Physics	Alexander Zucker	Oak Ridge National Laboratory	Nuclear structure physics		
Natural Sciences	Plant Sciences	Robert E. Beardsley	Manhattan College	Crown-gall tumor induction in plants		
Natural Sciences	Plant Sciences	Ernest M. Gifford	University of California, Davis			
Natural Sciences	Plant Sciences	William Paul Jacobs	Princeton University	Movement of hormones in plant roots		
Natural Sciences	Plant Sciences	George G. Laties	University of California, Los Angeles	Regulatory mechanisms governing respiratory activity in plant tissues		
Natural Sciences	Plant Sciences	Oswaldo Fidalgo			Also won in 1964	
Natural Sciences	Plant Sciences	A. Douglas McLaren	University of California, Berkeley	Photochemistry of viruses, particularly at short wavelengths of ultraviolet radiation		
Natural Sciences	Plant Sciences	Albert L. Page	University of California, Riverside			
Natural Sciences	Statistics	Erich L. Lehmann	University of California, Berkeley	Nonparametric techniques and their properties	Also won in 1955, 1979	
Social Sciences	Anthropology and Cultural Studies	Kenneth Eyre Read	University of Washington			
Social Sciences	Anthropology and Cultural Studies	David M. Schneider	University of Chicago			
Social Sciences	Economics	Lloyd G. Reynolds	Yale University	Revenue and expenditure patterns in European industrial countries	Also won in 1954	
Social Sciences	Economics	T. Y. Shen	University of California, Davis			
Social Sciences	Economics	Douglas Y. Thorson	Bradley University			
Social Sciences	Economics	Sho-Chieh Tsiang	University of Rochester	Monetary theory		
Social Sciences	Economics	Lloyd Ulman	University of California, Berkeley	Assessment of the effectiveness of incomes policies in selected European countries		
Social Sciences	Education	Solon T. Kimball	University of Florida			
Social Sciences	Geography and Environmental Studies	Sheldon Judson	Princeton University	Physical environment and human occupancy in Etruria from Villanovan time to the present	Also won in 1961	
Social Sciences	Geography and Environmental Studies	Donald William Meinig	Syracuse University	Historical and cultural geography of the American West		
Social Sciences	Geography and Environmental Studies	H. Roy Merrens	University of Wisconsin			
Social Sciences	Geography and Environmental Studies	Rhoads Murphey	University of Michigan, Ann Arbor			
Social Sciences	Law	Richard Reeve Baxter	Harvard Law School	Creation of customary international law		
Social Sciences	Law	Charles Montgomery Gray	University of Chicago			
Social Sciences	Law	Ernest van den Haag	New School for Social Research			
Social Sciences	Law	Stephan Kuttner	Yale University	Medieval canon law	Also won in 1956	
Social Sciences	Law	Richard B. Lillich	Syracuse University College of Law	Substantive rules governing the responsibility of states for injuries to aliens		
Social Sciences	Political Science	David P. Calleo	Yale University	Postwar British attitudes toward European unity		
Social Sciences	Political Science	René Albrecht-Carrié	Columbia University			
Social Sciences	Political Science	Richard Michael Cyert	Carnegie Institute of Technology	Decision-making		
Social Sciences	Political Science	Bernard B. Fall	Howard University	Viet Cong		
Social Sciences	Political Science	Robert Allen Goldwin	University of Chicago	John Locke's works in Great Britain		
Social Sciences	Political Science	Arnold Kramish	University of California, Los Angeles	Interaction of science and technology with other elements of national and internal policy		
Social Sciences	Political Science	Val R. Lorwin	University of Oregon			
Social Sciences	Political Science	John D. Martz	University of North Carolina, Chapel Hill	Class and political culture in Ecuador		
Social Sciences	Psychology	Peter C. Dodwell	Queen's University at Kingston			
Social Sciences	Sociology	James Samuel Coleman	Johns Hopkins University	Theory of collective decisions		
Social Sciences	Sociology	Nathan Glazer	University of California, Berkeley	Comparative studies in problems of social policy	Also won in 1954	
Social Sciences	Sociology	Talcott Parsons	Harvard University			
Social Sciences	Sociology	Rita J. Simon	University of Illinois, Urbana			

== 1966 Latin American and Caribbean Fellows ==
Category	Field of Study	Fellow	Institutional association	Research topic	Notes	Ref
Creative Arts	Fiction	Max Aub	Universidad Nacional Autónoma de México	Mexican Revolution	Also won in 1968, 1971	
Creative Arts	Fine Arts	Alberto W. Collie	Harvard Graduate School of Design (student)	Sculpture		
Creative Arts	Fine Arts	Marta Minujín		Move to New York City		
Creative Arts	Fine Arts	Honorio Morales		Travel to New York City		
Creative Arts	Fine Arts	Luis Felipe Noé			Also won in 1965	
Creative Arts	Poetry	Homero Aridjis	Instituto Nacional de Bellas Artes		Also won in 1979	
Humanities	Architecture, Planning and Design	Teresa Gisbert de Mesa	Higher University of San Andrés		Also won in 1958	
Humanities	Fine Arts Research	José Roberto Teixeira Leite	State University of Campinas			
Humanities	Folklore and Popular Culture	Isabel Aretz	Instituto Nacional de Cultura y Bellas Artes	Indigenous music of South and Central America		
Humanities	Folklore and Popular Culture	Luis Felipe Ramón y Rivera	National Institute of Folklore			
Humanities	Iberian and Latin American History	José A. Gautier	Universidad de Puerto Rico			
Humanities	Iberian and Latin American History	José Miranda González (es)	Universidad Nacional de México		Also won in 1957	
Humanities	Linguistics	Luis Jaime Cisneros	Universidad Nacional Mayor de San Marcos	Philological studies		
Humanities	Music Research	Francisco Curt Lange				
Humanities	Spanish and Portuguese Literature	Enrique Carlos Pezzoni	Universidad de Buenos Aires	Poetry of Octavio Paz		
Humanities	Theatre Arts	Gabriela Roepke Bahamonde	Universidad Católica de Chile			
Natural Sciences	Earth Sciences	Carlos de Paula Couto	National Museum of Brazil		Also won in 1949, 1951	
Natural Sciences	Earth Sciences	José F. Bonaparte	National University of Tucumán		Also won in 1972	
Natural Sciences	Engineering	Kenneth S. Julien	University of the West Indies			
Natural Sciences	Medicine and Health	João Garcia Leme	Faculdade de Medicina de Ribeirão Preto			
Natural Sciences	Molecular and Cellular Biology	Jorge E. Allende	Institute of Physical Chemistry and Pathology		Also won in 1971	
Natural Sciences	Molecular and Cellular Biology	Fernando Bastarrachea	Instituto Politécnico Nacional		Also won in 1965	
Natural Sciences	Organismic Biology and Ecology	Miguel A. Klappenbach	National Museum of Natural History, Uruguay			
Natural Sciences	Organismic Biology and Ecology	Pablo R. San Martín	Universidad de Montevideo	General study on the Bothriuridae family		
Natural Sciences	Organismic Biology and Ecology	Eduardo del Solar Osses	University of Chile		Also won in 1965	
Natural Sciences	Plant Sciences	Aylthon Brandão Joly	Universidade de São Paulo			
Natural Sciences	Plant Sciences	Armando Dugand	National University of Colombia		Also won in 1965	
Natural Sciences	Plant Sciences	Maria Eneyda Pacheco Kauffman Fidalgo	Botanical Garden of São Paulo		Also won in 1964	
Natural Sciences	Plant Sciences	Rafael Ramon Romero Castañeda	Universidad Nacional de Colombia			
Social Sciences	Anthropology and Cultural Studies	Fernando Horcasitas	National School of Anthropology and History			
Social Sciences	Anthropology and Cultural Studies	Ramiro Matos Mendieta (es)	National University of the Center of Peru		Also won in 1965	
Social Sciences	Anthropology and Cultural Studies	Alberto Rex González (es)	National University of La Plata, National University of the Littoral		Also won in 1956, 1967	

== See also ==
- Guggenheim Fellowship
- List of Guggenheim Fellowships awarded in 1965
- List of Guggenheim Fellowships awarded in 1967
