= Greever =

Greever is a surname. Notable people with the surname include:

- Garland Greever (1883–1967), American writer, poet, and academic
- Paul R. Greever (1891–1943), American member of U.S. Congress from Wyoming
- William S. Greever (1916–2007), American professor of history

== See also ==
- Grever
