= Heady =

Heady is a surname. Notable people with the surname include:

- Brett Heady (born 1970), Australian footballer
- Harold Franklin Heady (1916–2011), American forester and ecologist
- Morrison Heady (1829–1915), American poet
- Ray E. Heady (1916–2002), American clergyman

== See also ==
- Lena Headey, Bermudan-English actress
