= Henry Hurst =

Henry Hurst may refer to:

- Henry Hurst (theologian) (1629–1690), English Nonconformist theologian and ejected minister
- Henry David Hurst (1916–2003), classicist and historian
- Hal Hurst (Henry William Lowe Hurst, 1865–1938), English painter and miniaturist

== See also ==
- Henry Hirst (1838–1911), New Zealand member of parliament
- Henry Beck Hirst (1813–1874), American poet
