= Francis Hamabe =

American painter

- Born: Francis Emritz Hamabe; August 1, 1917; Orange, New Jersey
- Died: March 2, 2002 (aged 84); Bristol, Rhode Island
- Spouse(s): Sydney Gardner (1947-1978^{†}), Phyllis Parker (1980-2002)

Francis Emritz Hamabe (1917 — 2002) was an American artist of Japanese and Swedish descent. He mainly worked in the state of Maine.

Known best for his screen printing, oil painting and Sumi ink drawing, he also cartooned, including for The New Yorker and The Philadelphia Inquirer, and produced murals. He was the first art instructor for the Farnsworth Art Museum and the first art director of Down East, The Magazine of Maine. In 1952 he co-founded the Maine Coast Artists cooperative (later the Center for Maine Contemporary Art) with Denny Winters, William and Stell Shevis, William Thon, Mildred Burrage and William Kienbusch.

Hamabe lived briefly in Rockport, Maine before settling for a time in Blue Hill, Maine. He taught at the Blue Hill Consolidated School, the University of Maine at Orono and the University of Maine at Machias.
