= Center for Maine Contemporary Art =

- Location: 21 Winter Street; Rockland, Maine, U.S.
- Coordinates: 44°11′15″N 69°04′13″W
- Type: Art museum
- Architect: Toshiko Mori
- Website: cmcanow.org

Founded in 1952, the Center for Maine Contemporary Art (CMCA) is a contemporary arts institution, presenting a year-round program of changing exhibitions featuring the work of emerging and established artists with ties to Maine. In addition, CMCA offers a full range of educational programs for all ages, including gallery talks, performances, film screenings, and hands-on workshops. In 2016, CMCA opened a newly constructed 11,500+ square foot building, with 5,500 square feet of exhibition space, designed by architect Toshiko Mori. Located in downtown Rockland, Maine, across from the Farnsworth Art Museum and adjacent to the Strand Theatre, the new CMCA has three exhibition galleries, a gift shop, a lecture hall, an ArtLab classroom, and an open public courtyard.

== History ==
The Center for Maine Contemporary Art was originally established in Rockport, Maine as Maine Coast Artists, an artists' cooperative including Denny Winters, William and Stell Shevis, William Thon, Mildred Burrage, William Kienbusch and Francis Hamabe. For its first fifteen years, the center had no permanent space and a rotating slate of volunteer curators. Early exhibitions were held at the Rockport town office, in a barn, in a storage loft, and in a former schoolhouse, among other venues. Nevertheless, those shows also included such artists as Alex Katz, Louise Nevelson, Fairfield Porter, and William Zorach, to name just a few.

In 1967, a new director, Mildred Cummings—whose husband, Willard Cummings, was a founder of the Skowhegan School of Painting and Sculpture—oversaw the purchase of a former firehouse and livery stable in Rockport. Over the next nearly five decades in that location, the center thrived, incorporating itself as a non-profit, and in recognition of its broadening scale, renamed itself the Center for Maine Contemporary Art in 2002. Among the hundreds of artists that have shown at CMCA are Lois Dodd, David Driskell, Alan Magee, John Walker, Neil Welliver, Robert Indiana, and Jamie Wyeth.

== See also ==
- Farnsworth Art Museum
