= Michael Cardozo =

Michael Cardozo may refer to:

- Michael A. Cardozo (1941–2025), American lawyer and Corporation Counsel for New York City from 2002 to 2013
- Michael H. Cardozo (1910–1996), American lawyer
