= Temple Emanuel (Grand Rapids, Michigan) =

Reform synagogue in Grand Rapids, Michigan, United States

- Hebrew: בית המקדש עמנואל
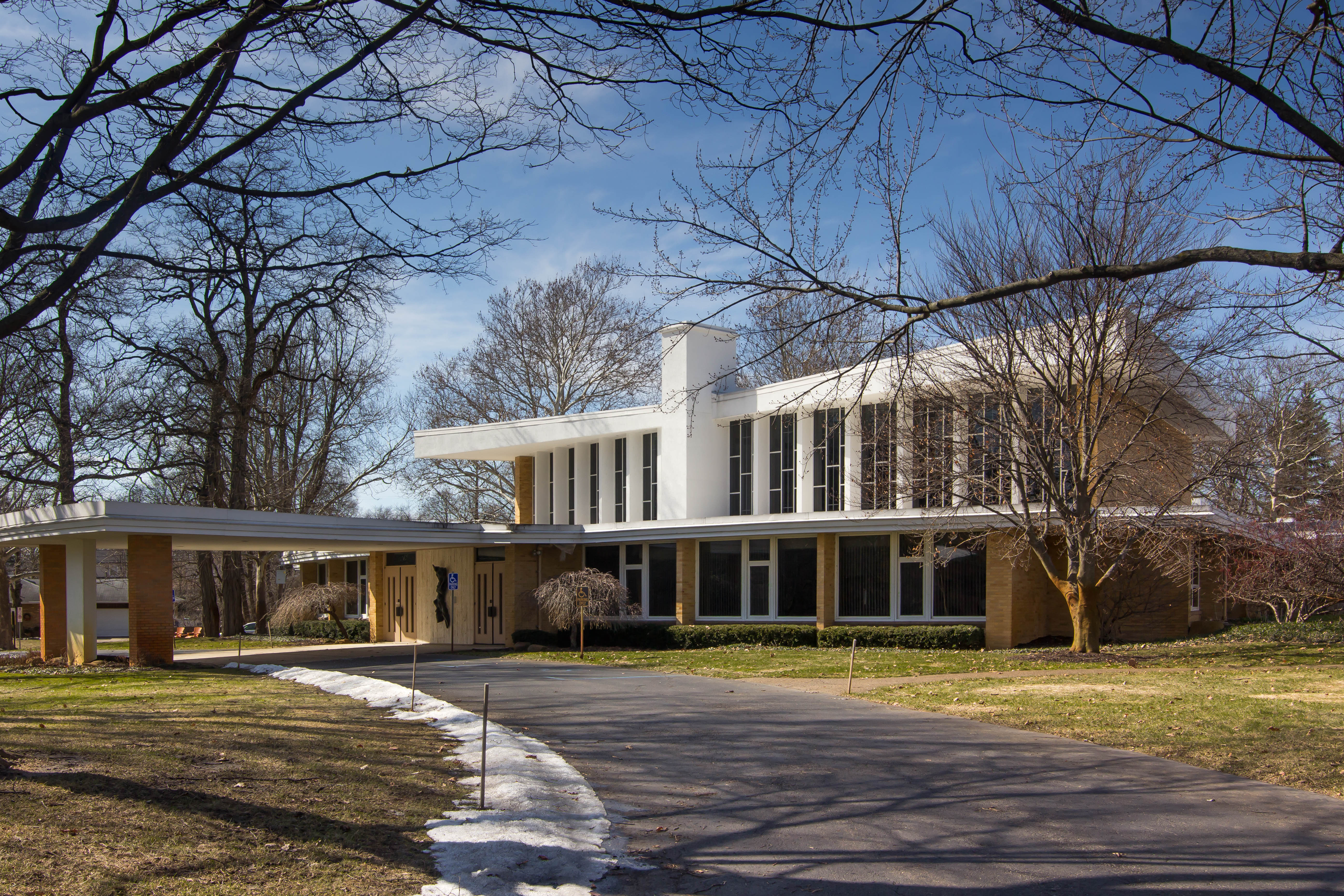
- Temple Emanuel in 2019

- Location in Michigan

Religion
- Affiliation: Reform Judaism
- Ecclesiastical or organizational status: Synagogue
- Leadership: Rabbi Javier E Cattapan; Rabbi Albert Lewis (Emeritus)
- Status: Active
- Notable artworks: Calvin Albert sculpture; Tiffany glass window; Lucienne Bloch mural

Location
- Location: 1715 Fulton Street East, Grand Rapids, Michigan 49503
- Country: United States
- Interactive map of Temple Emanuel
- Coordinates: 42°57′46″N 85°37′37″W

Architecture
- Architects: D. S. Hopkins (1882); Erich Mendelsohn (1952)
- Type: Synagogue
- Style: Modernist
- Established: 1857 (as a congregation)
- Completed: 1882 (Fountain Street); 1952 (Fulton Street)

Website
- grtemple.org

Temple Emanuel (Hebrew: בית המקדש עמנואל) is a Reform Jewish synagogue located at 1715 Fulton St East, in Grand Rapids, Michigan, in the United States. The congregation was founded in 1857 and describes itself as the fifth oldest Reform congregation in the United States.

== History ==
The congregation erected its first building in 1882 at the corner of Fountain and Ransom Streets. The architect was D.S. Hopkins. In 1996 it was in use as an office building and was the oldest synagogue building still standing in Michigan.

The 1952 building by Erich Mendelsohn, was completed in the Modernist style that is set low and wide, constructed of brick and glass with butterfly-wing roofs. The unusual floor plan of twin rooms, side by side, for the sanctuary and social space, are separated by an electronically retractable wall, enabling doubling of capacity for High Holiday services. Notable artworks includes a sculpture by Calvin Albert, a mural by Lucienne Bloch, reflecting the festivals of the Jewish year, and a 1926 Tiffany glass window depicting the biblical story of Ruth and Boaz. The window was moved from the 1882 building when the congregation erected its new synagogue. In 1992 a major renovation of the sanctuary and public spaces was undertaken.

== Gallery ==
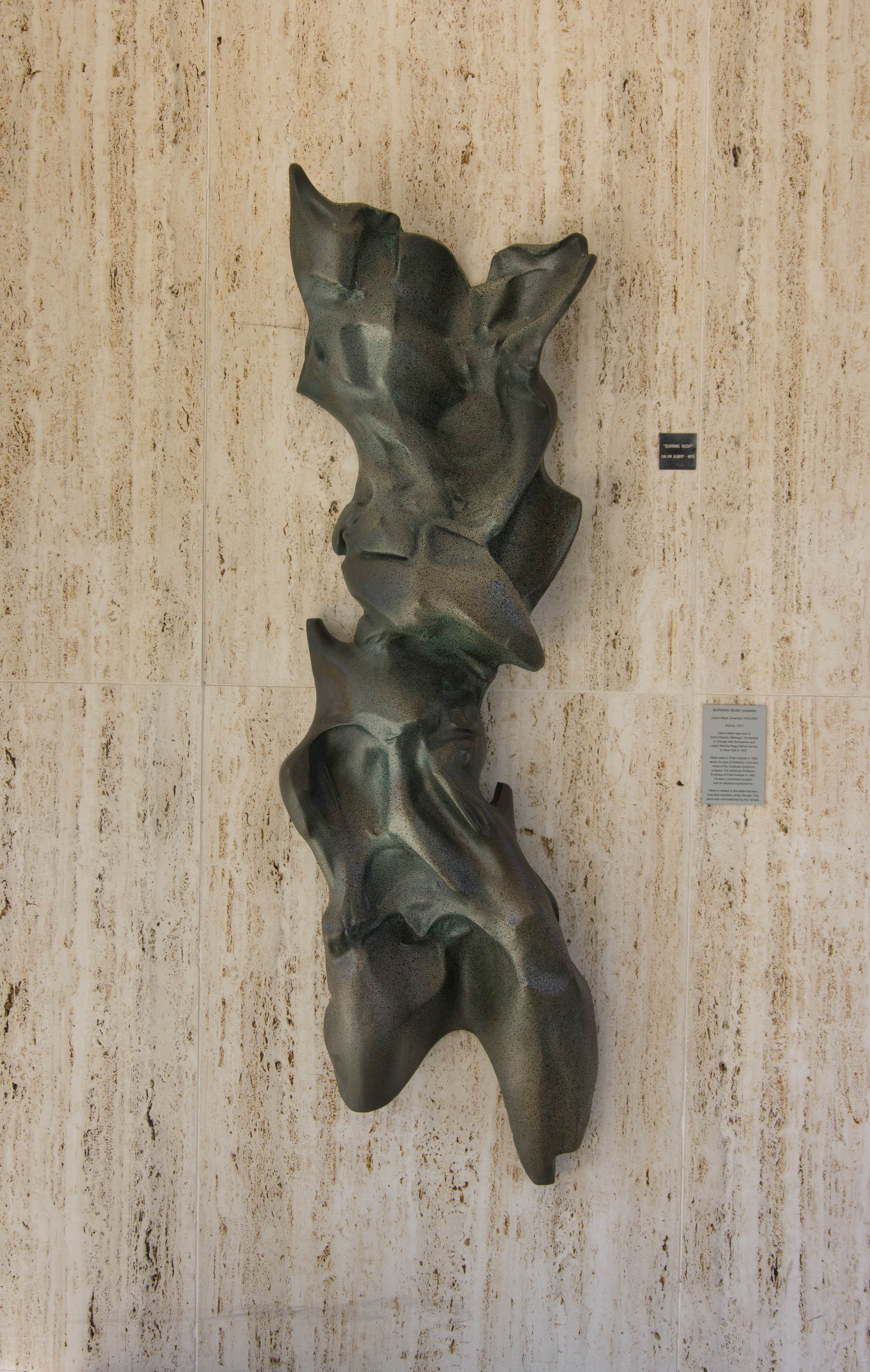
Burning Bush sculpture by Calvin Albert

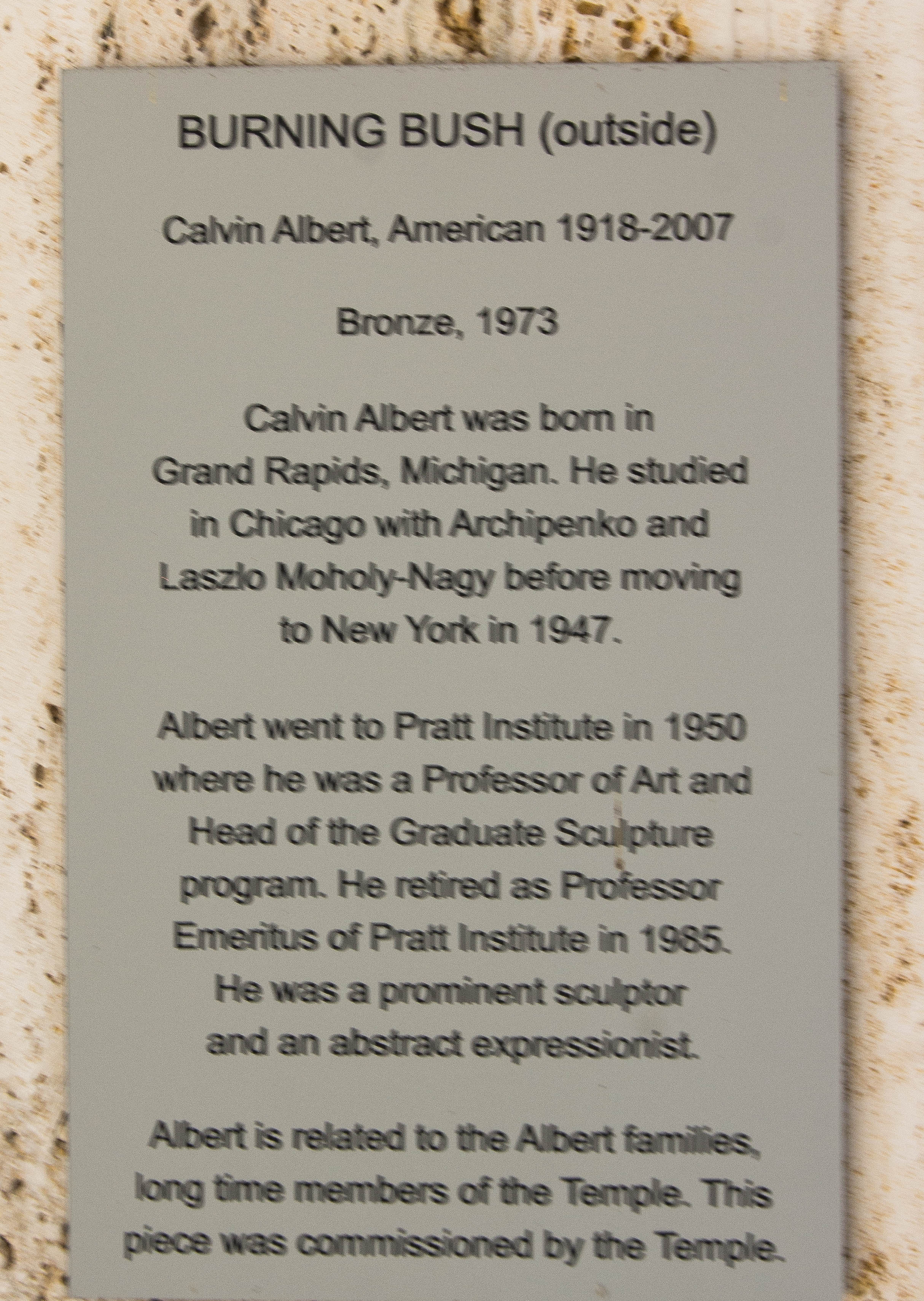
Descriptive plaque of Burning Bush
