= List of London Record Society publications =

This is an incomplete list of the publications of the London Record Society.

== Main series by volume number ==
1. Chew, H. M. ed., London possessory assizes: a calendar, (1965)
2. Glass, D. V. ed., London inhabitants within the walls, 1695, (1966)
3. Darlington, I. ed., London Consistory Court Wills, 1492–1547, (1967)
4. Steer, F. W., Scriveners' Company Common paper, 1357–1628, with a continuation to 1678, (1968)
5. Rowe, D. J. ed., London radicalism, 1830–43: a selection from the papers of Francis Place, (1970)
6. Chew, H. M.; Weinbaym, M. eds., The London Eyre of 1244, (1970)
7. Hodgett, G. A. J. ed., The Cartulary of Holy Trinity, Aldgate, (1971)
8. Dietz, B. ed., The port and trade of Elizabethan London: documents, (1972)
9. Croft, P. ed., The Spanish Company, (1973)
10. Chew, H. M.; Kellaway, W. eds., London Assize of Nuisance, 1301–1431: a Calendar, (1973)
11. Welch, C. E. ed., Two Calvinistic Methodist Chapels, 1743–1811: the London Tabernacle and Spa Fields Chapel, (1975)
12. Weinbaum, M. ed., The London Eyre of 1276, (1976)
13. McHardy, A. K., The Church in London, 1375–1392, (1977)
14. Davis, T. W. ed., Committees for repeal of the Test and Corporation Acts: minutes, 1786–90 and 1827–8, (1978)
15. Price, J. M. ed., Joshua Johnson’s Letterbook, 1771–1774: letters from a merchant in London to his partners in Maryland, (1979)
16. Kitching, C. J. ed., London and Middlesex Chantry Certificates, 1548, (1980)
17. Creaton, H. J. ed., London Politics 1713–1717, (1981)
18. Basing, P. ed., Parish Fraternity Register: Fraternity of the Holy Trinity and SS. Fabian and Sebastian in the parish of St. Botolph without Aldersgate, (1982)
19. Harris, G. G. ed., Trinity House of Deptford transactions, 1609–35, (1983)
20. Masters, B. R. ed., Chamber accounts of the 16th century, (1984)
21. Steckley, G. F. ed., The letters of John Paige, London merchant, 1648–58, (1984)
22. Keene, D.; Harding, V., A Survey of documentary sources for property holding in London before the Great Fire, (1985)
23. Port, M. H., ed., The commissions for building fifty new churches: the minute books, 1711–27, a calendar, (1986)
24. Richard Hutton's Complaints Book: The Notebook of the Steward of the Quaker Workhouse at Clerkenwell, 1711–1737
25. Westminster Abbey Charters, 1066-c.1214
26. London Viewers and their Certificates, 1508–1558: Certificates of the Sworn Viewers of the City of London
27. The Overseas Trade of London: Exchequer Customs Accounts, 1480–1
28. Justice In Eighteenth-Century Hackney: The Justicing Notebook of Henry Norris and the Hackney Petty Sessions Book
29. Two Tudor Subsidy Assessment Rolls for the City of London: 1541 and 1582
30. London Debating Societies, 1776–1799
31. London Bridge: Selected Accounts and Rentals, 1381–1538
32. London Consistory Court Depositions, 1586–1611: List and Indexes
33. Chelsea Settlement and Bastardy Examinations 1733–1766
34. The Church Records of St Andrew Hubbard Eastcheap, c. 1450-c. 1570
35. London and Middlesex Exchequer Equity Pleadings, 1685–6 And 1784–5: A Calendar
36. The Letters of William Freeman, London Merchant, 1678–1685
37. Unpublished London Diaries: A Checklist of unpublished diaries by Londoners and visitors with a select Bibliography of published diaries
38. The English Fur Trade In The Later Middle Ages
39. The Bede Roll of the Fraternity of St Nicholas Eds. N. W. & V. A. James, 2004. ISBN 0900952393
40. The Estate and Household Accounts of William Worsley, Dean of St Paul's Cathedral, 1479–1497
41. A Woman in Wartime London: The Diary of Kathleen Tipper 1941–1945. Ed. Patricia and Robert Malcolmson, 2006. ISBN 0900952415
42. Prisoners' Letters to the Bank of England 1783–1827. Ed. Deirdre Palk, 2007. ISBN 0900952423
43. The Apprenticeship Of A Mountaineer: Edward Whymper's London Diary 1855–1859
44. The Pinners' and Wiresellers' Book 1462–1511
45. London Inhabitants Outside the Walls
46. The Views of Hosts of Alien Merchants 1440–1444
47. The Great Wardrobe Accounts of Henry VII and Henry VIII
48. Summary Justice in the City
49. The Diaries of John Wilkes, 1770–1797
50. A Free-Spirited Woman. The London Diaries of Gladys Langford, 1936–1940

== Occasional publications ==
- Sims, J.M. (1970) London and Middlesex published records: A handlist. Occasional Publications, Vol. 1.

== Extra series ==
- McEwan, J.A. (2016) Seals in Medieval London 1050-1300. A Catalogue. Extra Series, Vol. 1.

== Sources ==
- https://londonrecordsociety.org.uk/publications/
- https://boydellandbrewer.com/imprints-affiliates/london-record-society.html
- http://royalhistsoc.org/wp-content/uploads/2014/09/londonrecordsociety.pdf
