= Bonnie Honig =

American political theorist (born 1959)

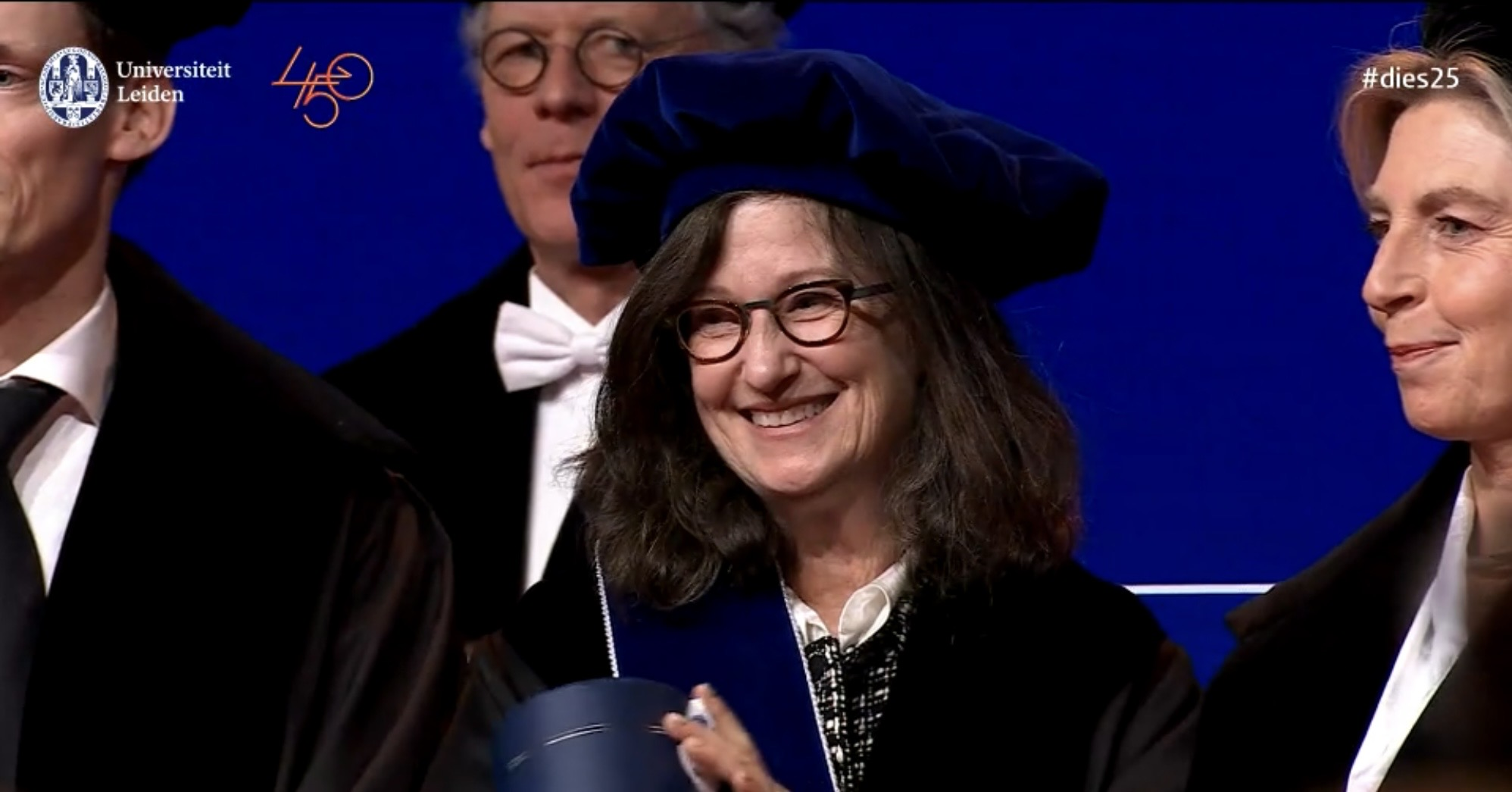
- Honig (2025)
- Born: 1959 (age 66–67)

Education
- Education: Concordia University (BA); London School of Economics (MSc); Johns Hopkins University (MA, PhD)
- Thesis: Virtue and Virtuosity: Politics in a Post-Kantian World (1989)
- Doctoral advisors: Richard E. Flathman and William E. Connolly

Philosophical work
- Era: Contemporary philosophy
- Institutions: Brown University; Northwestern University
- Notable works: Political Theory and the Displacement of Politics (1993); Democracy and the Foreigner (2001); Emergency Politics: Paradox, Law, Democracy (2009)

Bonnie Honig (born 1959) is a political scientist, feminist, and legal theorist specializing in democratic theory. In 2013–14, she became Nancy Duke Lewis Professor-Elect of Modern Culture and Media and Political Science at Brown University, succeeding Anne Fausto-Sterling in the Chair in 2014–15. Honig was formerly Sarah Rebecca Roland Professor of Political Science at Northwestern University and Research Professor at the American Bar Foundation.

== Education ==
Born in 1959, she received her PhD from Johns Hopkins University, an MSc from LSE, and her undergraduate degree from Concordia University in Montreal.

== Career ==
Honig taught at Harvard University for several years before moving to Northwestern University. The 1997 decision by then-President of Harvard Neil Rudenstine not to offer Honig tenure was highly controversial, and attracted harsh criticism from a number of prominent Harvard professors as a violation of Rudenstine's stated commitment to increasing the number of tenured female professors. In 2017–2018 Honig served as Interim Director of the Pembroke Center at Brown University.

Before Public Things, Honig published Antigone, Interrupted (2013, Cambridge University Press). In 2012, her previous book, Emergency Politics: Paradox, Law, Democracy (Princeton University Press, 2009) was awarded the David Easton Prize. Also in 2012, she won the Okin-Young Award in Feminist Political Theory for "Ismene's Forced Choice: Sacrifice and Sorority in Sophocles' Antigone," published in Arethusa. From 2016–2017 she held a fellowship at the Katz Center for Advanced Judaic Studies and conducted research on political thought.

== Research ==
Honig is most well known in political theory for her advocacy of a contestatory conception of democratic politics, also known as agonism. In her book Political Theory and the Displacement of Politics (Cornell, 1993, awarded the 1994 Foundations of Political Thought Book Prize for best first book in political theory), she develops this notion through critiques of consensual conceptions of democracy. Arguing that every political settlement engenders remainders to which it cannot fully do justice, she draws on Nietzsche and Arendt, among others, to bring out the emancipatory potential of political contestation and of the disruption of settled practices. Recognizing, on the other hand, that politics involves the imposition of order and stability, she argues that politics can neither be reduced to consensus, nor to pure contestation, but that these are both essential aspects of politics.

Her second book, Democracy and the Foreigner (Princeton University Press, 2001), aims to describe the underestimated role of foreignness in democratic politics, particularly in the (re)founding of democratic communities. In doing so, she aims to shift the question from how to deal with foreigners to “What problems does foreignness solve for us?” This strategy of subverting binary oppositions (such as contestation vs. consensus, foreignness vs. familiarity, decision vs. deliberation, and in her third book Emergency Politics: Paradox, Law and Democracy (Princeton University Press, 2009), normality vs. exception) by shifting the question of a well-known debate in order to obtain a new perspective, recurs throughout her work and the insights that result constitute her distinctive contributions to political theory.

In Antigone, Interrupted (Cambridge University Press, 2013), Honig intervenes in the recent turn to mourning and lamentation in political theory and cultural studies. By way of a rereading of Sophocles' tragedy, she counters the privileging of mortality and vulnerability as part of an anti-sovereign politics. Instead, Honig offers an “agonistic humanism” that stresses equality in life, not death, and an activist politics of counter-sovereignty.

In April 2013, Honig delivered the “Thinking Out Loud” Lectures in Sydney, Australia. In the lectures, entitled “Public Things,” Honig draws on D.W. Winnicott and Hannah Arendt to conceptualize the importance of public things to democratic life. Honig elaborated this theory in a lecture delivered at the annual Neal A. Maxwell Lecture in Political Theory and Contemporary Politics at the University of Utah entitled “The Fight for Public Things.” It was subsequently published as part of a symposium in Political Research Quarterly. The ensuing book, Public Things: Democracy in Disrepair, was published by Fordham University Press in 2017. The argument of the book is encapsulated in her 2017 Boston Review essay, "The President’s House Is Empty."

== Personal life ==
Honig is married to MIT economist Michael Whinston. Her son Noah is the CEO of eSports gaming franchise Immortals.

== Selected bibliography ==
=== Books ===
- Honig, Bonnie (1993). Political theory and the displacement of politics. Ithaca: Cornell University Press. ISBN 9780801480720.
- Honig, Bonnie (2001). Democracy and the foreigner. Princeton, New Jersey Oxford: Princeton University Press. ISBN 9780691114767.
- Honig, Bonnie (2009). Emergency politics: paradox, law, democracy. Princeton, New Jersey: Princeton University Press. ISBN 9780691152592.
- Honig, Bonnie (2013). Antigone, interrupted. Cambridge New York: Cambridge University Press. ISBN 9781107668157.
- Honig, Bonnie (2017). Public Things: Democracy in Disrepair. Fordham, New York. ISBN 978-0823276400

=== (Co-)edited books ===
- Honig, Bonnie (1995). Feminist interpretations of Hannah Arendt. University Park, Pennsylvania: Pennsylvania State University Press. ISBN 9780271014470.
- Honig, Bonnie; Mapel, David R. (2002). Skepticism, individuality, and freedom the reluctant liberalism of Richard Flathman. Minneapolis: University of Minnesota Press. ISBN 9780816639700.
- Honig, Bonnie; Phillips, Anne; Dryzek, John S. (2008). The Oxford handbook of political theory. Oxford: Oxford University Press. ISBN 9780199548439.
- Honig, Bonnie; Marso, Lori (2015). Politics, Theory Film: Critical Encounters with Lars von Trier. Oxford University Press, Oxford, 2016. ISBN 9780190600174

=== Selected articles ===
- Honig, Bonnie (March 1991). "Declarations of independence: Arendt and Derrida on the problem of founding a republic". The American Political Science Review. 85 (1): 97–113. doi:10.2307/1962880. JSTOR 1962880.
- Honig, Bonnie (February 2007). "Between decision and deliberation: political paradox in democratic theory". The American Political Science Review. 101 (1): 1–17. doi:10.1017/S0003055407070098. S2CID 56214768.
- Honig, Bonnie (February 2009). "Antigone's lament, Creon's grief: mourning, membership and the politics of exception". Political Theory. 37 (1). Sage: 5–43. doi:10.1177/0090591708326645. JSTOR 20452679. S2CID 154871100.

=== Interviews ===
- Ordinary Emergences in Democratic Theory: An Interview with Bonnie Honig
- By Rossello, Diego; "Honig, Bonnie". Philosophy Today Vol. 59, No. 4
