= Grevers =

Grevers is a surname. Notable people with the surname include:

- Chantal Grevers (born 1961), Dutch cricketer
- Matt Grevers (born 1985), American swimmer

== See also ==
- Grever
