= Garland Greever =

Garland Greever (1883–1967) was an American writer, poet, and academic. His Century Handbook of Writing, written with Easley S. Jones and first published in 1918, was an influential manual for English composition teachers.

== Academic career ==
Greever taught in the English Department at the University of Southern California, along with Frank C. Baxter, and was acquainted with poet Robert Frost, for whom he tried, without success, to get a residency at USC in 1933. He was friends also with novelist and poet Hamlin Garland, whom he invited to attend his classes for guest lectures; Garland, in turn, would mentor Greever's promising students.

=== Century Handbook and other publications ===
In 1918, he and Easley S. Jones published the Century Handbook of Writing; this book, which followed Edwin C. Woolley's Handbook of Composition (the first "handbook of mechanical correctness" in the United States), competed with Woolley's for dominance in the market until the 1930s. Woolley's Handbook (or Woolley) had been the first composition book with guidelines on grammar and mechanical correctness, rather than a focus on rhetoric, which had dominated the textbook market since the mid-1800s. Greever and Jones's Century Handbook, which Robert Connors calls "Woolley's great imitator and competitor", improved on Woolley in a few ways. First, it was meant for classroom use, whereas Woolley was more intended for the teacher as a guide to correcting "themes", as weekly composition essays were called. Second, it featured exercises that accompanied the various rules, where Woolley had only a small, separate section of exercises. In addition, Woolley's 350 rules were compressed; the Century had only 100. The book's "rules and exercises are arranged on a decimal plan by means of which the student may be easily referred to the portion of the book he needs to study".

With Joseph M. Bachelor, he published two more "Century" textbooks for English studies, The Century Vocabulary Builder (1923) and The Century Book of Selections (1924). The latter contained "short literary excerpts--interesting, well chosen, and skillfully arranged--to serve as models for students (approximately college freshmen) in their writing", and was recommended for in-class use: "This class reading is not only of value in itself; it forces the student to cope with new words, gives him examples of good style, and not infrequently introduces new ideas."

In 1926, Greever published A Wiltshire Parson and His Friends, an edition of the correspondence of William Lisle Bowles. He had discovered a letter Samuel Taylor Coleridge had written to Bowles, and on the basis of that letter and a few other notes, identified four (anonymously published) literary reviews as Coleridge's, a claim accepted by at least one other scholar. These four reviews were printed in Coleridge's Miscellaneous Criticism, published in 1936 by Thomas Middleton Raysor. Charles I. Patterson, however, argued in 1951, in an article published in the Journal of English and Germanic Philology, that only the 1797 review of The Monk was written by Coleridge.

== Selected publications ==
- Three American Poems: Poe's Raven, Longfellow's Courtship of Miles Standish, and Whittier's Snow-Bound. Edited for School Use ("The Lake English Classics"). Chicago: Scott, Foresman & Co., 1910.
- The Facts and Backgrounds of Literature-English and American, with George F. Reynolds, 1920.
  - The Facts and Backgrounds of Literature, with George F. Reynolds. 1922.
- The Century Vocabulary Builder, with Joseph M. Bachelor, 1922.
- The Century Handbook of Writing, with Easley S. Jones, 1922.
  - The Century Handbook of Writing, with Easley S. Jones, rev. ed., 1924.
  - The Century Handbook of Writing, with Easley S. Jones, 3rd ed., 1932.
  - The Century Handbook of Writing, with Easley S. Jones, 4th ed., 1942.
- The Century Book of Selections, with Joseph M. Bachelor. New York: Century Co., 1924.
- A Wiltshire Parson and His Friends, The Correspondence of William Lisle Bowles. London: Constable, 1926.
- The Century Collegiate Handbook, with Easley S. Jones, rev. ed.
- The Centennial Edition of the Writings of Sidney Lanier, gen. ed. Charles R. Anderson; Greever edited vol. 5, Tiger-Lilies and Southern Prose. Baltimore: The Johns Hopkins Press, 1945.
- Excursions into Practical Composition, 1952.
