= Nancy Duke Lewis =

- Born: 1 November 1910; Lexington, KY
- Died: 31 July 1961 (aged 50)

Academic background
- Education: University of Kentucky

Academic work
- Institutions: Pembroke College in Brown University

Nancy Duke Lewis (1 November 1910 - 31 July 1961) was the Dean of Pembroke College, Brown University.

== Career ==
Nancy Duke Lewis graduated from the University of Kentucky with a master's degree in 1933. She subsequently studied at Syracuse University before joining the faculty at University of North Carolina. In 1943, she moved to Brown University, where she initially taught mathematics and was social director of Pembroke College. She held a series of administrative roles in the college: Assistant Dean (1944–47), Dean of Students (1947–49), and Acting Dean (1949–50), before being appointed as Dean in 1950.

In 1949, Lewis was the first woman to be awarded a grant by the Carnegie Institute for the study of the Administration of Higher Education.

== Awards ==
Lewis was awarded honorary degrees by Tufts University (1956), Muhlenberg College (1957), Wheaton College (1960), and the Women's College of North Carolina (1960).

== The Nancy Duke Lewis Chair ==
The Nancy Duke Lewis Chair was the first chair endowed at Brown University for a female faculty member. It is held by "a senior scholar in any field who is distinguished in any area of gender and sexuality studies". Since 2014 the chair has been held by Bonnie Honig, following Anne Fausto-Sterling (2009–2014), Nancy Armstrong (1992–2009), Naomi Schor (1985–1989), Joan Wallach Scott (1980–1985) and Rosalie Colie (1967–1972).
