= Jacob Myron Price =

American historian

Jacob Myron Price

Jacob "Jack" Myron Price, FBA, FRHS, (8 November 1925 – 6 May 2015) was a historian known for his detailed studies of the early modern Atlantic economy. He was closely associated with the Institute of Historical Research of London University.

== Selected publications ==
- Reading for Life. Developing the college student's life-time reading interest. University of Michigan Press, Ann Arbor, 1959. (Editor)
- The tobacco adventure to Russia. Enterprise, politics, and diplomacy in the quest for a northern market for English colonial tobacco, 1676-1722. Philadelphia, 1961. (Transactions of the American Philosophical Society. New series, Vol. 51, part 1.)
- The dimensions of the past. Materials, problems, and opportunities for quantitative work in history. American Historical Association. Committee on Quantitative Data. Yale University Press, New Haven, 1972. (Edited with Val R. Lorwin)
- France and the Chesapeake. A history of the French tobacco monopoly, 1674-1791, and of its relationship to the British and American tobacco trades, etc. University of Michigan Press, Ann Arbor, 1973. ISBN 047208738X
- Joshua Johnson's letterbook, 1771-1774: Letters from a merchant in London to his partners in Maryland . London Record Society, London, 1979. (Editor) ISBN 0900952156
- Capital and credit in British overseas trade: The view from the Chesapeake, 1700-1776. Harvard University Press, Cambridge, Mass., 1980. ISBN 0674094808
- Perry of London: A family and a firm on the seaborne frontier, 1615-1753. Harvard University Press, Cambridge, Mass., 1992. ISBN 0674663063
- Tobacco in Atlantic trade: The Chesapeake, London and Glasgow 1675-1775. Variorum, Aldershot, 1995. ISBN 0860785483
- Overseas trade and traders: Essays on some commercial, financial, and political challenges facing British Atlantic merchants, 1660-1775. Variorum, Aldershot, 1996. ISBN 0860785912
- The Atlantic frontier of the thirteen American colonies and states: Essays in eighteenth century commercial and social history. Variorum, Aldershot, 1996. ISBN 0860785866
