= Joseph M. Bachelor =

American writer and academic

Joseph Morris Bachelor also known as Joseph Morris (May 17, 1889 near Sharonville, Ohio – December 5, 1947 in Hamilton, Ohio) was an American author, poet, editor and educator.

Bachelor was educated at Miami University (A.B., 1911) and Harvard University (A.M. 1912). As an undergraduate at Miami University, he joined a local organization which later became the national fraternity, Phi Kappa Tau. He is considered the author of the fraternity's Ritual and wrote the lyrics to its first song, with Joseph W. Clokey writing the music. After teaching English at Cornell College in Iowa (1913-1917), he worked as an editor for the Century Company in New York City where he was definitions editor of The New Century Dictionary in two volumes. He returned in 1927 to teach at his alma mater, Miami University where he remained until his death in 1947. He was a popular and rigorous professor teaching Shakespeare and a course he developed called "Words." Upon his death, he bequeathed over 400 acres (1.6 km^{2}) of woodland and streams, including Harker's Run, to Miami University. The land is today known as the Bachelor Wildlife and Game Reserve. He collaborated with other professors on at least ten English textbooks, two of them with Garland Greever, The Century Vocabulary Builder (1922) and The Century Book of Selections (1924). He also edited a series of poetry collections (under his pen name Joseph Morris) in collaboration with St. Clair Adams which included poems by Bachelor and Adams.

Bachelor fell ill at his Oxford, Ohio home and died in a Hamilton, Ohio hospital on December 5, 1947. He was buried in the Bachelor family plot at Spring Grove Cemetery in Cincinnati.

An academic building on the Miami University campus was named Bachelor Hall in 1979 as a memorial.
