= Bachelor Hall (Miami University) =

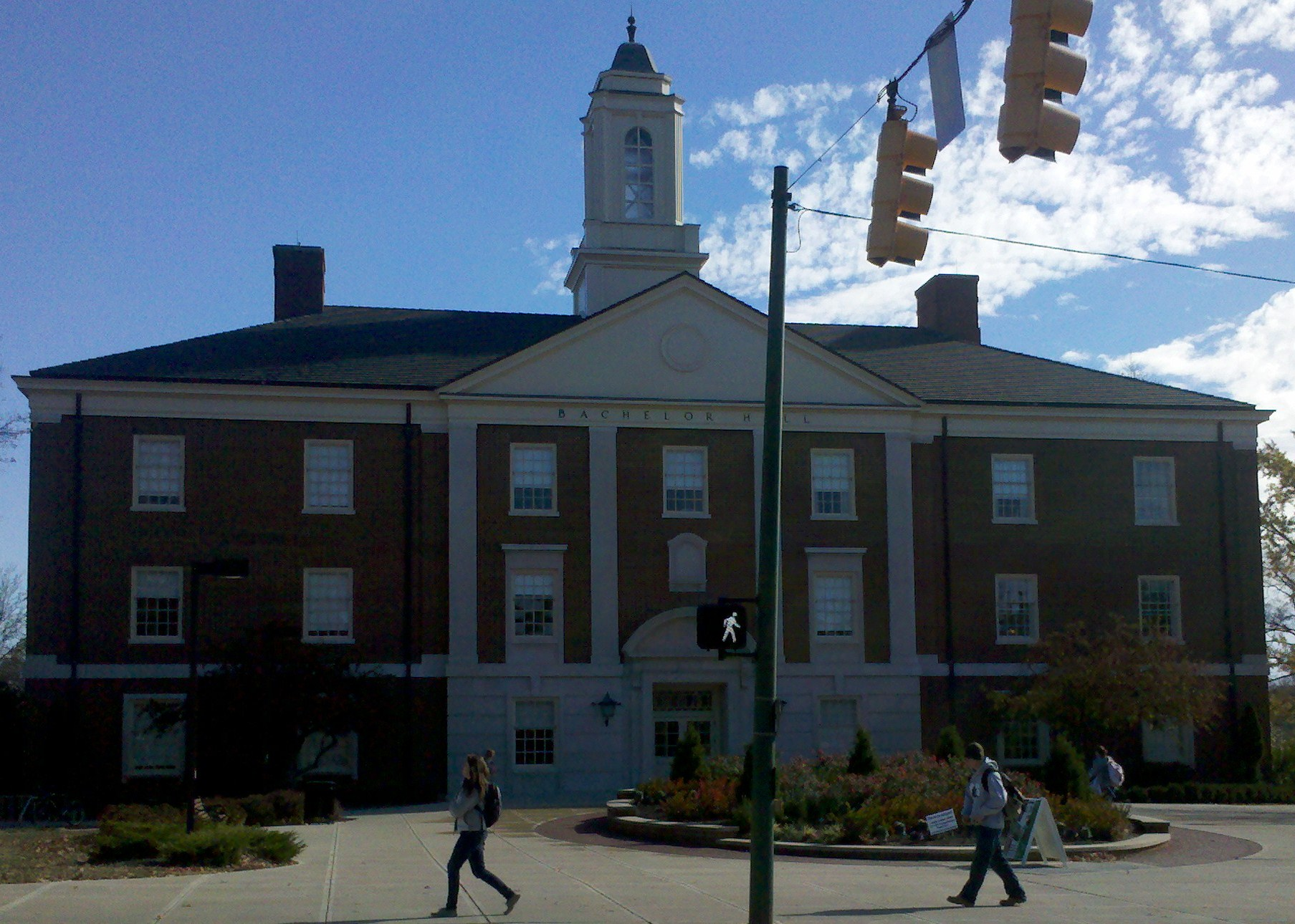
- Viewed from Patterson Avenue
- Interactive map of Bachelor Hall
- Former names: Communications Building
- Alternative names: BAC

General information
- Type: brick
- Architectural style: Georgian architecture
- Location: Oxford, Ohio
- Coordinates: 39°30′25.8″N 84°43′48″W
- Completed: 1978
- Cost: $5,352,000

Technical details
- Floor count: 3
- Floor area: 260,000 m^{2} (2,800,000 sq ft)

Design and construction
- Architects: George F. Roth and partners

Bachelor Hall is an academic building on the campus of Miami University in Oxford, Ohio, United States. It was built in 1978 and named after Miami alumnus and English professor Joseph M. Bachelor. It houses the English and mathematics departments, the Speech and Hearing Clinic, and the chair of communications and theatre.

== History ==
In April 1977, the Board of Trustees voted to construct a $6 million communications building to be located at the southwest corner of Patterson Avenue and Route 73. During construction, the building at that time was called the Communications Building. On November 4, 1979, Miami University held a dedication ceremony for Joseph M. Bachelor. A member of the class of 1911 and a professor of English at the university from 1927 to 1946, the new communications building would be called Bachelor Hall in his honor and contributions to Miami. Students, staff and faculty came to the ceremony.

After Bachelor Hall was built in 1978, the university had to address issues about traffic and pedestrian crossing. The university and the city of Oxford approved of two pedestrian crosswalks at the intersection of Patterson Avenue and Spring Street. At the same time, they approved pedestrian traffic controllers to regulate traffic signals at the intersections.

In 2024, construction began on a $72 million renovation to the building, to be completed in 2026. The renovations included enclosing the building's courtyard and modernizing its classrooms. After construction is complete, Bachelor Hall will house the university's departments of English, history, journalism, and philosophy, as well as the Miami University Humanities Center, Ohio Writing Project, and other humanities projects.
