= Myra L. Uhlfelder =

American classical philologist (1923–2011)

- Born: 1923; Cincinnati
- Died: 2011 (aged 87–88); Centerville, Ohio

Academic background
- Education: University of Cincinnati; Bryn Mawr
- Thesis: De proprietate sermonum vel rerum (1952)

Academic work
- Discipline: Classics; Medieval Latin
- Institutions: Bryn Mawr

Myra L. Uhlfelder (1923-2011) was a professor of classics at Bryn Mawr. She is known for her work on classical and Medieval Latin.

== Career ==
Uhlfelder studied at the University of Cincinnati (A.B. 1945, MA 1946), and completed a PhD at Bryn Mawr in 1952 under the supervision of Berthe Marie Marti. Her dissertation was published as 'De proprietate sermonum uel rerum. A Study and Critical Edition of a Set of Verbal Distinctions' in the series Papers and monographs of the American Academy in Rome. She taught at Sweet Briar College for 1950-2 and at the State University of Iowa, 1952–63, where she became assistant professor. In 1963, she returned to the department of Latin at Bryn Mawr, where she taught until her retirement in 1991. In her retirement, she continued to work on Boethius, and a book on the subject was published posthumously in 2016.

== Awards and fellowships ==
Uhlfelder received the Rome Prize at the American Academy in Rome for the years 1948–50. She was a Guggenheim fellow in 1958–9.

== Selected publications ==
- 'University of Michigan Latin Workshop,' The Classical Weekly 46 (1952) 3-5
- De proprietate sermonum vel rerum: A study and critical edition of a set of verbal distinctions. Papers and monographs of the American Academy in Rome, vol.15. Roma: American Academy in Rome. 1954.
- 'Further Thoughts on Caesar and Latinity,' Classical Journal 50 (1954) 65-6
- 'Medea, Ariadne and Dido,' Classical Journal 50 (1955) 310-12
- 'The Romans on Linguistic Change,' Classical Journal 59 (1963) 23-30
- '"Nature" in Roman Linguistic Texts,' Transactions and Proceedings of the American Philological Association 97 (1966) 583-95
- John the Scot, Periphyseon: On the Division of Nature (trans.) with summaries by Jean A. Potter, Library of Liberal Arts 157 (Indianapolis: Bobbs-Merrill, 1976)
- The Dialogues of Gregory the Great: Book Two, Saint Benedict. New York: Macmillan. 1986. ISBN 9780024221001
- The Consolation of Philosophy as Cosmic Image. Medieval & Renaissance Texts & Studies, vol. 474. Tempe, AZ: ACMRS. 2016.
