= Dennis Byng =

American painter and professor of art

Dennis Byng

Untitled (Byng 74 A 70 2.2), Dennis E. Byng, 1974. Cast lucite, approx. 11.5" square. Albany Institute of History & Art.

Dennis E. Byng (6 November 1927 – 21 August 2008) was professor of art, State University of New York at Albany (1968–92), and a practicing artist who specialised in the use of coloured plastic in sculpture.

== Early life and education ==
Dennis E. Byng was born in Duluth, Minnesota, in 1927. He completed his M.S. at the University of Wisconsin in 1952.

== Teaching ==
Byng taught at Purdue University, Smith College at the University of Minnesota and the Massachusetts College of Art before joining the State University of New York at Albany in 1968 where he became professor of art before retiring in 1992. He was a Guggenheim Fellow in 1958 and 1959.

== Art ==
Byng's artistic career started in painting where he experimented with transparent glazes to create colored light effects on semi-abstract figures but he was best known for his later use of plastic in sculpture. He first used the material when he cut a female figure in laminated plexiglas in 1966 and used it in a painting. By 1968 he was creating freestanding non-representational sculpture in an attempt to eliminate complex form and maximize the effect of colored light in his chosen materials.

He developed techniques of coloring the outside of plastic blocks and of laminating plastics of different color, creating square and rectangular forms with a highly polished and seamless finish that belied the high degree of technical skill and processing required to make them. In 1972, he began to use lucite as his medium instead of plexiglas as lucite offered him greater flexibility in creating color effects. Untitled (Byng 74 A 70 2.2) was one of sixteen cubes of identical size that Byng cast in different colors and exhibited at the Martha Jackson Gallery in 1974. It was created using successive casts in a mold that was tipped between casts to create a hollow centre that was then filled in white and sealed. The whole was then put under pressure for 12 hours in an industrial autoclave to remove air bubbles, then heated to cure the material into a solid, then milled, polished and annealed to complete the work. It is displayed on a transparent stand to allow light to enter and refract from all sides.

By 1980, Byng had stopped making sculpture and was moving back to painting, partly due to the toxicity of plastics.

== Death and legacy ==
Byng died on 21 August 2008. His work has been compared to that of Larry Bell, DeWain Valentine, and Robert Irwin. The Albany Institute of History and Art have six of his works in their collection and Byng's work is also represented in over 100 public and private collections.

== Exhibitions ==
- Martha Jackson Gallery, New York, 1969, 1974, 1977.
- Albany Institute of History & Art, 1970.
- State University of New York at Albany, 1973.
- Anderson Gallery, Buffalo, New York, 1993.

== See also ==
- Josef Albers
- Light and Space (art movement)
