= Thomas Middleton Raysor =

20th-century American literary scholar

Thomas Middleton Raysor (March 9, 1895–September 8, 1974) was an American literary scholar.

== Life ==
Raysor was born at Chapel Hill, Texas, the son of Paul Montgomery Raysor and his wife Mary Matthews. He was University of Chicago in 1914, and he received a B.A. degree from Harvard University in 1917, followed by an M.A. 1920 and a Ph.D. in 1922. Bernard DeVoto was a friend from his time at Harvard.

Raysor joined the Army in 1918. In Europe for a year, he studied S. T. Coleridge, returning to a position at the University of Minnesota. Then at the State College of Washington from 1924, he held a Guggenheim Fellowship, awarded in 1926.

From 1930 Raysor was Chairman of the English Department at the University of Nebraska. His scholarly views led him to value solely textual research on major authors, and he clashed with Louise Pound of the university over a study of Helen Hunt Jackson, by Ruth Odell. Regarded as an Anglophile, he attacked in 1941 the isolationism of the America First Committee, and with others petitioned the federal government on assistance for the United Kingdom.

== Legacy ==
Raysor's papers are held by the library of the University of California Santa Barbara.

== Works ==
- Coleridge's Shakespearean Criticism (1930) editor
- Coleridge's Miscellaneous Criticism (1936) editor
- The English Romantic Poets: a Review of Research (1950) editor
- Selected Critical Essays of Wordsworth and Coleridge

== Family ==
Raysor married Ellen Devereux Koopman, at Cohasset, Massachusetts on July 5, 1923; they had two daughters. In later life they moved to Goleta, California.
