= Ray E. Heady =

Ray E. Heady (February 17, 1916 – May 7, 2002) was an American clergyman.

He devoted his adult life to the ministry as a pastor of several churches in the North Texas area except for two years while pastoring in Bowling Green, Kentucky. He was the founding pastor of White Settlement Assembly of God and ministered at Broadview Assembly of God in Fort Worth, Texas for 28 years until he retired.

Heady wrote the lyrics for over 100 gospel songs through the years. His songs have been recorded by such artists as The Blackwood Brothers, The Oak Ridge Boys, Red Foley and Gov. Jimmie Davis. These songs included In the Shelter of His Arms, At an Altar of Prayer, A Very Special Grace and many others.
