= Gabriela Roepke =

Chilean dramatist and playwright

- Born: 1920; Santiago
- Died: 2013 (aged 92–93)
- Education: University of Paris (La Sorbonne); University of North Carolina
- Writing career
- Genre: Theatre (psychological drama)
- Notable awards: Guggenheim Fellowship

Gabriela Roepke (1920 in Santiago – November 2013) was a Chilean Dramatist and playwright, theater actress, poet, essay writer and professor of theater.

Gabriela Roepke studied theater in University of Paris (La Sorbonne) and university of North Carolina. She founded Teatro de Ensayo (the Theatre School of the Catholic University of Chile).

in 1966 while Roepke was at the University of the Arts, Philadelphia, she was awarded a Guggenheim Fellowship.

Roepke's plays are often described as ‘psychological drama’. They are also absurd, fantastic and comedic.

== Works ==
=== Plays ===
- 1954. La invitación (The Invitation) (in Spanish)
- 1955. Los culpables (The Guilty), later titled Juegos silenciosos (Silent Games), 1959 (in Spanish)
- 1955. Las santas mujeres (The Holy Women) (in Spanish)
- 1957. Los peligros de la buena literatura (The Dangers of Good Literature). In Apuntes 18 (1961), 24-40 (in Spanish)
- 1958. La telaraña (The web) (in Spanish)
- 1959. Juegos silenciosos (Silent games) (in Spanish)
- 1959. Una Mariposa Blanca (A white butterfly) (in Spanish)
- 1964. El bien fingido (The Feigned Interest) (in Spanish)
- 1965. Un castillo sin fantasmas (A Castle Without Ghosts) (in Spanish)
- 1965. Martes 13 (Tuesday, the 13th) (in Spanish)

=== Poem ===
- Primeras canciones (First songs) (1944)
- Jardín solo (1947)
