= Grever =

Grever is a surname of Dutch and North German origin. Notable people with the surname include:

- Bob Grever (1930–2016), American music executive
- María Grever (1885–1951), Mexican musician

== See also ==
- Grevers
