= London Record Society =

Scholarly text publisher since 1964

- Founded: 1964
- Country of origin: United Kingdom
- Headquarters location: London
- Distribution: Boydell & Brewer
- Publication types: Books
- Nonfiction topics: History of London
- Official website: londonrecordsociety.org.uk

The London Record Society is a text publication society founded in 1964 whose objectives are to stimulate public interest in archives and similar historical material relating to London. The president of the society is the lord mayor of London. The society is a registered charity.

== Activities ==
The society holds an annual public lecture about London archives and publishes transcripts, translations, abstracts and lists of primary sources relating to the history of London. The society usually publishes one major scholarly work per annum which is provided free to members. Typical recent publications have included:

- James, N. W.; James, V. A., eds. (2004). The Bede Roll of the Fraternity of St. Nicholas. London Record Society Publications. Vol. 39. ISBN 0-900952-39-3.
- Kleineke, Hannes; Hovland, Stephanie R., eds. (2004). The Estate and Household Accounts of William Worsley Dean of St Paul's Cathedral 1479–1497. London Record Society. Vol. 40. ISBN 0900952407.
- Malcolmson, Patricia; Malcolmson, Robert, eds. (2006). A Woman in Wartime London: the diary of Kathleen Tipper 1941–1945. London Record Society. Vol. 41. ISBN 0-900952-41-5.
- Palk, Deidre, ed. (2007). Prisoners' Letters to the Bank of England, 1781–1827. London Record Society. Vol. 42. ISBN 0900952423.
- Smith, Ian, ed. (2008). The Apprenticeship of a Mountaineer: Edward Whymper's London diary, 1855–1859. London Record Society. Vol. 43. ISBN 9780900952432.
- Megson, Barbara, ed. (2009). The Pinners' and Wiresellers' Book 1462–1511. London Record Society. Vol. 44. ISBN 9780900952449.
- Wallis, Patrick, ed. (2010). London Inhabitants outside the Walls, 1695. London Record Society. Vol. 45. ISBN 9780900952456.
- Bradley, Helen, ed. (2012). The Views of the Hosts of Alien Merchants. London Record Society. Vol. 46. ISBN 9780900952500.
- Hayward, Maria Anne, ed. (2012). The Great Wardrobe Accounts of Henry VII and Henry VIII. London Record Society. Vol. 47. ISBN 9780900952524.
- Smith, Greg T., ed. (2013). Summary Justice in the City: a selection of cases heard at the Guildhall Justice Room, 1752–1781. London Record Society. Vol. 48. ISBN 9780900952531.
- Eagles, Robin, ed. (2014). The Diaries of John Wilkes, 1770–1797. London Record Society. Vol. 49. ISBN 9780900952548.
- Malcolmson, Patricia; Malcolmson, Robert, eds. (2014). A Free-Spirited Woman: the London diaries of Gladys Langford, 1936–1940. London Record Society. Vol. 50. ISBN 9780900952555.
- Argent, Alan, ed. (2016). The Angel's Voice: a magazine for young men in Brixton, London, 1910–1913. London Record Society. Vol. 51. ISBN 9780900952579.
- Woolven, Robin, ed. (2017). The London Diary of Anthony Heap, 1931–1945. London Record Society. Vol. 52. ISBN 9780900952586.
- Milne, Sarah A., ed. (2019). The Dinner Book of the London Drapers' Company, 1564–1602. London Record Society. Vol. 53. ISBN 9780900952609.
- Brett, Colin J., ed. (2020). Thomas Kytson's 'Boke of Remembraunce' 1529 to 1540. London Record Society. Vol. 54. ISBN 9780900952593.
- Barron, Caroline M.; Wright, Laura, eds. (2021). The London Jubilee Book, 1376–1387: an edition of Trinity College Cambridge MS O.3.11, folios 133–157. London Record Society. Vol. 55. ISBN 9780900952616.
- New, Elizabeth A., ed. (2022). Records of the Jesus Guild in St Paul's Cathedral, c.1450–1550: an edition of Oxford, Bodleian MS Tanner 221, and associated material. London Record Society. Vol. 56. ISBN 9780900952623.
- Vaninskaya, Anna, ed. (2022). London Through Russian Eyes, 1896–1914: An Anthology of Foreign Correspondence. London Record Society. Vol. 57. ISBN 9780900952029.

Extra Series

- McEwan, John A., ed. (2016). Seals in Medieval London, 1050–1300: a catalogue. London Record Society Extra Series. Vol. 1. ISBN 9780900952562.

From volume 46 onwards, the society's publications have been published by Boydell and Brewer, from whom the society's back catalogue is also available. Volumes 1–40 are available at British History Online.

== See also ==
- List of London Record Society publications
