= Henry David Hurst =

Henry David Hurst (July 7, 1916 – June 6, 2003), known also as Dom David Hurst OSB and to his colleagues and students as Father David, was a classicist and historian best recognized for his scholarship on Bede. He spent the greater part of his career as a teacher of Greek and Latin at the Portsmouth Abbey School, a prep school in Rhode Island with an attached monastery.

Hurst was born in Bardstown, Kentucky. He attended Catholic University of America in Washington, D.C., obtaining a Master of Arts degree there in 1943. Hurst took vows as a Benedictine monk of Portsmouth Priory on June 30, 1942, and was ordained to the priesthood on June 15, 1946.

In 1958 he was awarded a Guggenheim Fellowship to study the works of Bede in European monasteries. From 1969 to 1975 he taught at the Catholic Seminary Foundation in Indianapolis, Indiana. He returned to teach at Portsmouth Abbey after that, but a heart attack in 1977 caused him to retire.

Despite his obligations as a secondary school classics teacher and as an active member of his monastic community, he became well known for his critical editions and translations of Bede's writings. He also published scholarly work on Gregory the Great.

He died on June 6, 2003, in Portsmouth, Rhode Island.

== Bibliography ==
- Bedae Venerabilis Opera, multiple volumes; editors David Hurst, Charles Williams Jones, J. E. Hudson, Max Ludwig Wolfram Laistner (Turnholti, Belgium: Brepols, 1955-1960).
- The commentary on the seven Catholic Epistles of Bede the Venerable; translated by David Hurst (Kalamazoo, Mich.: Cistercian Publications, 1985). ISBN 978-0879079826
- Forty Gospel Homilies: Gregory the Great; translated from the Latin by Dom David Hurst (Kalamazoo, Mich.: Cistercian Publications, 1990) ISBN 978-0879076238
- Homilies on the Gospels: Bede the Venerable; translated by Lawrence T. Martin and David Hurst, preface by Benedicta Ward, introduction by Lawrence T. Martin (Kalamazoo, Mich.: Cistercian Publications, 1991).
- Excerpts from the works of Saint Augustine on the letters of the Blessed Apostle Paul: Bede the Venerable; translated by David Hurst (Kalamazoo, Mich.: Cistercian Publications, 1999). ISBN 978-0879077839
