= S. Spafford Ackerly =

American psychiatrist (1895–1981)

- Born: 1895
- Died: 1981 (aged 85–86)
- Occupations: Psychiatrist; Professor
- Board member of: Kentucky Psychiatric Society; American Orthopsychiatric Society; American College of Psychiatrists; American Academy of Child Psychiatry

Academic work
- Discipline: Psychiatry
- Institutions: University of Louisville School of Medicine

S. Spafford Ackerly (1895–1981) was distinguished professor emeritus of psychiatry, University of Louisville School of Medicine. He was a Guggenheim fellow and founded the Kentucky Psychiatric Society, of which he was president. He was vice-president of the American Psychiatric Association, and president of the American Orthopsychiatric Society. He was also a charter fellow of the American College of Psychiatrists and a life fellow of the American College of Physicians. He was a founding member of the American Academy of Child Psychiatry.
