= Calvin Albert =

American artist

Calvin Albert (1918 in Grand Rapids, Michigan – June 4, 2007) was a member of American Abstract Artists, and Professor of Art at the Pratt Institute, from 1950 to 1985. He was a 1966 Guggenheim Fellow. He won an American finalist to the 1953 International Sculpture Competition.

== Life ==
He studied with Alexander Archipenko and László Moholy-Nagy. He moved to New York City in 1947. He lived in East Hampton, New York from 1965 to 1988.

His work is in the Art Institute of Chicago, the Brooklyn Museum, the Jewish Museum, the Heckscher Museum of Art, and the Museum of Modern Art. His papers are in the Archives of American Art.

== Bibliography ==
- Calvin Albert's figure drawing comes to life, Translator Dorothy Gees Seckler, Prentice Hall Press, 1986, ISBN 978-0-671-61255-9
