= François Bucher =

American art historian

François Bucher

François C. Bucher (1927 – November 9, 1999) was a Swiss-born American Medievalist, art historian, writer on medieval and contemporary art, and distinguished professor emeritus of medieval art and architecture at Florida State University.

== Biography ==
Bucher was born in Lausanne, Switzerland, to Alois Bucher and Gabrielle (Zundel) Bucher. After attending the Zurich Gymnasium, he obtained his BA in art history in 1941, and continued his studies in Zurich and Rome. In 1955 he obtained his PhD from the University of Bern, Switzerland.

Bucher started his academic career as a lecturer at the University of Bern in 1952. In 1953 he emigrated to the United States, where he started as instructor at the University of Minnesota. In 1954 he moved to Yale University, where he was appointed assistant professor and befriended Albert Einstein. For 1960 to 1962 he worked as associate professor at Brown University, and from 1962 to 1969 as full professor at Princeton University, until he was appointed Professor at the State University of New York in 1969. In 1978 he was appointed Professor of Art History at the Florida State University, where he spend the rest of his career. After his retirement he was appointed emeritus professor.

In 1958 Bucher was awarded a Guggenheim Fellowship, and an Institute of Advanced Studies fellowship.

== Selected publications ==
- Bucher, François. Notre-Dame de Bonmont und die ersten Zisterzienserabteien der Schweiz. Benteli, Bern, 1957.
- Bucher, François. Josef Albers: Despite Straight Lines. Yale University Press, New Haven, 1961.
- Bucher, François. The Pamplona Bibles. 2 vols. Yale University Press, New Haven, 1971.
- Bucher, François. The Dresden sketch-book of vault projection. Akadémiai Kiadó, 1972.
- Bucher, François. Architector: the Lodge Books and Sketchbooks of Medieval Architects. 4 vols. Abaris, New York, 1979.

Articles, a selection

- Bucher, François. "Design in Gothic architecture: a preliminary assessment." Journal of the Society of Architectural Historians 27.1 (1968): 49-71.
- Bucher, François. "Medieval architectural design methods, 800-1560." Gesta 11.2 (1972): 37-51.
- Bucher, François. "Micro-architecture as the'idea'of Gothic Theory and Style." Gesta 15.1/2 (1976): 71-89.
