= Rosalie Littell Colie =

Professor of comparative literature

Rosalie Littell Colie (1924-1972) was a professor of comparative literature, a specialist in Renaissance English literature, and a poet.

== Education ==
She received an A.B. from Vassar College in 1944, a M.A. from Columbia University in 1946, and a Ph.D. in English and History from Columbia in 1950.

== Career ==
In 1948-49, she was an instructor at Douglass College, and was appointed as Assistant and Associate Professor at Barnard College and Columbia, 1949-1961. She taught and researched at Wesleyan College 1961-1963, at the University of Iowa from 1963 to 1966, was visiting professor at Yale in 1966-67, and was visiting research professor at Oxford University, 1967–68, Lady Margaret Hall College. In January 1972 she received the first appointment of a woman to the chairmanship of an academic department at Brown University, in the Department of Comparative Literature. She was the first to hold the Nancy Duke Lewis Professorship, the first professorship at Brown endowed for women, which had been established in 1967. She received the Guggenheim Fellowship in Renaissance Studies twice, in 1958 and 1966.

Hannah Arendt was a visiting fellow at Wesleyan College from 1961 when Colie was teaching at Wesleyan. Their correspondence began in 1962, and Colie became a long-term correspondent of Arendt. In 1963, Colie had intended to fly to Europe to meet Arendt for a holiday, but these plans were thwarted by Colie's appointment to a position at the University of Iowa. On 19 March 1963, she wrote to Arendt: "I am going to go to Iowa: it is a good job. Full professorship, in both English literature and history, which is ideal. […] I feel a thousand years younger all of sudden, as if the albatross had gone off my neck and I could start to be a human being again instead of such a fake. […] The Iowa thing may ruin our summer plans. [S]han't get paid until September and have no dough." On Arendt's return from Europe, they spent a week together before Colie moved to Iowa, and they met again in Chicago in May, 1964.

Arendt wrote her a supportive reference in 1967 for her visiting position at Oxford University as Talbot Research Fellow, in which she described Colie as "one of the most erudite women I have ever known." Arendt also wrote a letter of recommendation for her later position at Brown. Letters between Colie and Arendt are held in the Hannah Arendt Papers at the Library of Congress Manuscript Division, Washington DC. They have been studied by the feminist scholar, Kathleen B. Jones.

Colie published works on Renaissance paradox, genre theory and Shakespeare. She drowned on 7 July 1972 when her canoe overturned on the Lieutenant River near her home in Old Lyme, Connecticut. Her friend George Robinson, an editor at Princeton University Press, published a posthumous selection of her poems.

== Works ==
- Some Thankfulnesse to Constantine: A Study of English Influence upon the Early Works of Constantijn Huygens (The Hague: Martinus Nijhoff, 1956).
- Light and Enlightenment: A Study of the Cambridge Platonists and the Dutch Arminians (Cambridge: Cambridge University Press, 1957).
- Paradoxia Epidemica: The Renaissance Tradition of Paradox (Princeton: Princeton University Press, 1966).
- "My Ecchoing Song": Andrew Marvell's Poetry of Criticism (Princeton: Princeton University Press, 1970).
- The Resources of Kind: Genre-theory in the Renaissance (Berkeley: University of California Press, 1973).
- Some Facets of King Lear: Essays in Prismatic Criticism (London: Heinemann, 1974).
- Shakespeare's Living Art (Princeton: Princeton University Press, 1974).
- Atlantic Wall, and Other Poems (Princeton: Princeton University Press, 1974).
- 'Literature and History', in James Thorpe, ed., Relations of Literary Study: Essays on Interdisciplinary Contributions (New York: MLA, 1967), pp. 1–27.
- 'The Essayist in His Essay', in John W. Yolton, ed., John Locke: Problems and Perspectives (Cambridge: Cambridge University Press, 1996), pp. 234–261.
