= Michael H. Cardozo =

American lawyer

- Born: September 15, 1910; Manhattan, New York, United States
- Died: October 20, 1996 (aged 86); Washington, United States

Michael Hart Cardozo IV (September 15, 1910 – October 20, 1996) was an American lawyer and professor who held government positions over more than a sixty-year career.

Cardozo was born in Manhattan, New York on September 15, 1910, and was raised in a Jewish household.

Cardozo died of chronic lung disease on October 20, 1996, aged 86, at his home in Washington. He was survived by his wife, three children, and five grandchildren.
