= Harold Franklin Heady =

American forester

Harold Franklin Heady (29 March 1916, Buhl, Idaho – 28 April 2011, La Grande, Oregon) was an American forester, botanist, prairie ecologist, and expert on range management.

Heady received in 1938 a B.S. from the University of Idaho and in 1940 an M.S. from the New York State College of Forestry in Syracuse. In 1942 he accepted a job teaching range management at Montana State University. Heady earned in 1949 a Ph.D. in plant ecology at the University of Nebraska under the prairie ecologist John Ernest Weaver and was, while working on his doctoral dissertation, on the faculty of Montana State University and then Texas A&M University.

Heady was one of the founders of the Society for Range Management (SRM) and at the SRM's January 1948 meeting became its first secretary–treasurer and in 1980 its president for a one-year term. He resigned from Texas A&M and became in 1951 an assistant professor in the School of Forestry of U. C. Berkeley, where Harold H. Biswell (1905–1992) and Arnold M. Schultz (1920–2013), two of John Weaver's former doctoral students, were also on the faculty. Heady helped to develop range management programs at both the Davis campus and the Berkeley campus of the University of California.

In 1965 the Interdepartmental Graduate Group in Range Management at Berkeley was established; Heady was the first chair of this group, and remained in that role until 1975. He authored or co-authored more than 150 journal articles, dealing with the ecology and management of California grasslands and various related subjects. He spent sabbaticals (supported by a Guggenheim Fellowship for 1958/59 and 2 Fulbright Fellowships) in Kenya, Saudi Arabia, and Australia. He retired from U.C. Berkeley in 1983 as professor emeritus.

His first wife Eleanor Heady née Butler died in 1979 and his second wife Ruth Heady née Atkinson died in 2001. Upon his death, he was survived by a daughter and a son, 3 grandchildren, and 4 great-grandchildren.
