= Donald F. Bond =

American professor emeritus and editor

Donald F. Bond (27 November 1898 - March 1987) was professor emeritus of English at the University of Chicago. He was the editor of the standard edition of The Spectator in five volumes, published in 1965, selections from which may be found in The Norton Anthology of English Literature. He was also the joint editor of the scholarly edition of the first three volumes of The Tatler. He was a contributor to the Encyclopædia Britannica. He was a Guggenheim Fellow.

== Selected publications ==
- Critical Essays from the Spectator by Joseph Addison With Four Essays by Richard Steele. Oxford University Press, Oxford, 1970. (Editor) ISBN 9780198710509
