= William S. Greever =

American historian

William St. Clair Greever (July 22, 1916, in Lexington, Virginia – January 14, 2007, in Moscow, Idaho) was an American professor of history, specializing in the history of mining and railroads in the nineteenth-century American West. He was a Guggenheim Fellow for the academic year 1958–1959.

== Biography ==
After graduating from Los Angeles High School, Greever matriculated at Pomona College and received his B.A. there in 1938. He graduated from Harvard University with M.A. in 1940 and Ph.D. in 1949 in U.S. History. During WW II he was from 1942 to 1946 in the U.S. Army, enlisting as a Private and rising to the rank of Technical Sergeant. He did paperwork in California, Utah, Texas, the Philippines, and Japan. In Ogden, Utah, he was Chief Clerk at the Ogden Prisoner of War Camp for Italian soldiers.

From 1947 to 1948 Greever was an instructor in business history at Northwestern University. In 1949 he joined the faculty of the history department of the University of Idaho and taught there until his retirement in 1982. He chaired the department from 1956 to 1982 and wrote numerous articles and book reviews. He was on sabbatical for the academic year 1958–1959 at Berkeley, California, where he did most of the research for his book Bonanza West. He was on the editorial board of the Pacific Historical Review from 1956 to 1958 and the editorial board of Idaho Yesterdays from 1976 to 1986.

Greever's book The Bonanza West: The Story of the Western Mining Rushes 1848-1900 (1st edition, 1941) won the 1963 Western Writers of America's Spur Award for best nonfiction western and in 1998 tied for fourth place in the Mining History Association's list of the top 20 best books on the history of mining. His book Arid Domain: The Santa Fe Railway and Its Western Land Grant (1st edition, 1954) won a 1954 prize for the annual best "first book" in Pacific American history from the American Historical Association's Pacific Branch. He received in 1987 (along with Merle Wells) the Western History Association's Award of Merit and in 1990 the Mining History Association's Rodman Paul Award.

Greever married Janet Elizabeth Groff (1921–2014) in 1951. She was an historian and during WW II worked for the U.S. Navy on decoding the Japanese naval cipher. Their daughter was born in 1957.

== Selected publications ==
=== Articles ===
- Greever, William S. (1950). "Two Arizona Forest Lieu Land Exchanges". Pacific Historical Review. 19 (2): 137–149. doi:10.2307/3635392. JSTOR 3635392.
- —— (1951). "A Comparison of Railroad Land-Grant Policies". Agricultural History. 25 (2): 83–90. JSTOR 3740821.
- —— (1957). "Railway Development in the Southwest". New Mexico Historical Review. 32 (2): 151.

=== Books ===
- Greever, William S. (1941). The Bonanza West: The Story of the Western Mining Rushes, 1848-1900. Norman: University of Oklahoma Press. 1963 pbk edition.
- —— (1954). Arid domain: The Santa Fe Railway and its western land grant. Stanford: Stanford University Press.
