= List of Guggenheim Fellowships awarded in 1959 =

Three hundred and twenty-one scholars and artists were awarded Guggenheim Fellowships in 1959. More than $1,500,000 was disbursed, averaging about $3,000 per recipient.

== 1959 U.S. and Canadian Fellows ==
Category	Field of Study	Fellow	Institutional association	Research topic	Notes	Ref
Creative Arts	Choreography	Merce Cunningham	Merce Cunningham Dance Company		Also won in 1954	
Creative Arts	Drama and Performance Art	William B. Branch		Writing		
Creative Arts	Fiction	Peter Feibleman		Novel Writing		
Creative Arts	Fiction	Edmund Keeley	Princeton University	Novel Writing	Also won in 1972	
Creative Arts	Fiction	Andrew Nelson Lytle	University of Florida	Novel Writing	Also won in 1940, 1941	
Creative Arts	Fiction	William Manchester	Wesleyan University	Novel Writing		
Creative Arts	Fiction	Mary McCarthy		Novel Writing	Also won in 1949	
Creative Arts	Fiction	Brian Moore		Novel Writing		
Creative Arts	Fiction	J. Saunders Redding	Hampton Institute	Novel Writing	Also won in 1944	
Creative Arts	Fiction	Philip Roth		Novel Writing		
Creative Arts	Fiction	Wallace Stegner	Stanford University	Novel Writing	Also won in 1949, 1952	
Creative Arts	Fiction	John Updike		Novel Writing		
Creative Arts	Fiction	Bianca VanOrden		Novel Writing		
Creative Arts	Fine Arts	Albert Alcalay		Painting		
Creative Arts	Fine Arts	Dennis Byng		Painting	Also won in 1958	
Creative Arts	Fine Arts	Richard Callner	Purdue University	Painting		
Creative Arts	Fine Arts	Edmond Casarella	Brooklyn Museum Art School	Printmaking		
Creative Arts	Fine Arts	Edris Eckhardt	Western Reserve University, Cleveland Institute of Art	Ceramics and glass sculpture	Also won in 1955	
Creative Arts	Fine Arts	Jerrold Davis		Painting		
Creative Arts	Fine Arts	Kahlil Gibran		Sculpture	Also won in 1960	
Creative Arts	Fine Arts	Leon Goldin		Painting		
Creative Arts	Fine Arts	Luise Clayborn Kaish				
Creative Arts	Fine Arts	Barbara Hult Lekberg	University of the Arts in Philadelphia	Sculpture	Also won in 1957	
Creative Arts	Fine Arts	Lee Mullican	University of California, Los Angeles	Painting		
Creative Arts	Fine Arts	Yutaka Ohashi		Painting	Also won in 1960	
Creative Arts	Fine Arts	Bernard Perlin		Painting	Also won in 1954	
Creative Arts	Fine Arts	Aubrey E. Schwartz	Harpur College, State University of New York	Printmaking	Also won in 1958	
Creative Arts	Fine Arts	Carol Summers		Printmaking		
Creative Arts	Fine Arts	Elbert Weinberg		Sculpture		
Creative Arts	Fine Arts	Ulfert Wilke	University of Louisville	Painting	Also won in 1960	
Creative Arts	Fine Arts	Jack Zajac	Pomona College	Sculpture		
Creative Arts	Music Composition	Gordon W. Binkerd	University of Illinois	Composing		
Creative Arts	Music Composition	Louis Calabro	Bennington College	Composing	Also won in 1954	
Creative Arts	Music Composition	Chou Wen-chung	University of Illinois	Composing	Also won in 1957	
Creative Arts	Music Composition	Halim El-Dabh		Composing	Also won in 1961	
Creative Arts	Music Composition	Lukas Foss	University of California, Los Angeles	Composing	Also won in 1945	
Creative Arts	Music Composition	Ben Johnston	University of Illinois	Composing		
Creative Arts	Music Composition	Karl Korte	Emma Willard School	Composing	Also won in 1970	
Creative Arts	Music Composition	John La Montaine		Composing	Also won in 1960	
Creative Arts	Music Composition	Lawrence K. Moss	Mills College	Composing	Also won in 1968	
Creative Arts	Music Composition	Mel Powell	Yale University	Composing		
Creative Arts	Music Composition	Seymour J. Shifrin	University of California, Berkeley	Composing	Also won in 1956	
Creative Arts	Music Composition	Yehudi Wyner	Hebrew Union College	Composing	Also won in 1976	
Creative Arts	Photography	Ansel Adams			Also won in 1946, 1948	
Creative Arts	Photography	Walker Evans			Also won in 1940, 1941	
Creative Arts	Photography	Helen Levitt		Color photography	Also won in 1960, 1981	
Creative Arts	Poetry	James V. Cunningham	Brandeis University	Writing	Also won in 1966	
Creative Arts	Poetry	Paul Hamilton Engle	University of Iowa	Writing	Also won in 1953, 1957	
Creative Arts	Poetry	Jorge Guillén	Princeton University	Influence of Mateo Aleman's Guzmán de Alfarache on the fiction of Spain, France, England, Germany and Holland from 1600 to 1750	Also won in 1954	
Creative Arts	Poetry	Anthony Evan Hecht	Smith College	Writing	Also won in 1954	
Creative Arts	Poetry	Ted Hughes	University of Massachusetts	Writing		
Creative Arts	Poetry	Adrienne Rich Conrad		Writing	Also won in 1952	
Creative Arts	Poetry	May Swenson		Writing		
Humanities	American Literature	Gay Wilson Allen	New York University		Also won in 1952	
Humanities	American Literature	Richard Davenport Birdsall	Connecticut College	Cultural history of New England, 1790-1815		
Humanities	American Literature	Merrell R. Davis				
Humanities	American Literature	Richard Beale Davis	University of Tennessee, Knoxville	Virginian culture in the Jeffersonian era	Also won in 1945	
Humanities	American Literature	Donald E. Stanford	Louisiana State University	Edward Taylor		
Humanities	American Literature	Arlin Turner	Duke University	Sectionalism in Southern literature since the Civil War	Also won in 1947	
Humanities	Architecture, Design and Planning	Ernest Born		Three-aisled timber hall in Europe		
Humanities	Architecture, Design and Planning	Walter W. Horn	University of California, Berkeley	Three-aisled timber hall in Europe		
Humanities	Bibliography	Robert G. Vosper	University of Kansas			
Humanities	Biography	Marjorie Wilkins Campbell		William McGillivray		
Humanities	British History	Stephen B. Baxter	University of North Carolina	William III of England	Also won in 1973	
Humanities	British History	Mark H. Curtis	University of California, Los Angeles	English Puritanism of the early 17th century		
Humanities	British History	Margaret Hastings	Douglass College, Rutgers University	Origins and early history of the legal profession in England		
Humanities	British History	Maurice duPont Lee, Jr.	Princeton University	Cabal ministry in Great Britain		
Humanities	British History	Robert K. Webb	Columbia University		Also won in 1973	
Humanities	Classics	Elias Joseph Bickerman	Columbia University		Also won in 1949	
Humanities	Classics	Doris Taylor Bishop	Wheaton College	Trade in Mediterranean in second century B.C.		
Humanities	Classics	Lionel Casson	New York University		Also won in 1952	
Humanities	Classics	Lloyd William Daly	University of Pennsylvania	History of alphabetization in antiquity and the Middle Ages		
Humanities	Classics	Sterling Dow	Harvard University	Studies in Greece in antiquity	Also won in 1934, 1966	
Humanities	Classics	George M. A. Grube	University of Toronto	History of literary criticism in ancient Greece and Rome		
Humanities	Classics	Lily Ross Taylor	Harvard University	Roman politics 220-44 B.C.	Also won in 1952	
Humanities	Classics	Alexander Turyn	University of Illinois	Greek manuscripts of the 13th and 14th centuries		
Humanities	East Asian Studies	John K. Fairbank	Harvard University	Problems of overseas Chinese economic development and Southeast Asian nationalism	Also won in 1951	
Humanities	East Asian Studies	George Alexander Kennedy	Yale University	History of the Chinese language		
Humanities	Economic History	Douglas Fitzgerald Dowd	Cornell University	Factors which tended to stimulate or inhibit the economic developments of Italy in the 18th and 19th centuries		
Humanities	English Literature	Robert Martin Adams	Cornell University	Relation between English poetical practice and poetical theory in the 17th century	Also won in 1974	
Humanities	English Literature	Harry Berger, Jr.	Yale University	Poetry of Edmund Spenser, with a special emphasis on The Faerie Queene		
Humanities	English Literature	Vinton A. Dearing	University of California, Los Angeles	John Dryden		
Humanities	English Literature	Ray Heffner	Indiana University	Shakespearian tragedies		
Humanities	English Literature	Samuel Hynes	Swarthmore College	Ford Madox Ford and English letters, 1895-1914	Also won in 1981	
Humanities	English Literature	J. Hillis Miller	Johns Hopkins University		Also won in 1965	
Humanities	English Literature	Karl F. Thompson	Michigan State University	Shakespeare's use of literary tradition		
Humanities	English Literature	Stuart M. Tave	University of Chicago			
Humanities	Fine Arts Research	Marvin Eisenberg	University of Michigan	Lorenzo Monaco		
Humanities	Fine Arts Research	Sheldon Keck	Brooklyn Museum	Painting conservation methods in Europe		
Humanities	Folklore and Popular Culture	William Eugene Simeone	Southern Illinois University	19th and 20th century Italian folklorists		
Humanities	French History	Richard Wilder Emery	Queens College		Also won in 1952	
Humanities	French History	Leo Gershoy	New York University	History of France, 1600-1789	Also won in 1936, 1939, 1946	
Humanities	French History	John Baptist Wolf	University of Minnesota		Also won in 1966	
Humanities	French Literature	Jean-Jacques Demorest	Cornell University	Literary creation in 17th century France		
Humanities	French Literature	René Girard	Johns Hopkins University		Also won in 1966	
Humanities	French Literature	Frédéric Grover	Swarthmore College	Pierre Drieu La Rochelle	Also won in 1960	
Humanities	French Literature	Jacques Eugene Henri Guicharnaud	Yale University	Dramatic and scenic qualities of Molière's plays		
Humanities	French Literature	Mario Leon Maurin	Bryn Mawr College	Andre Suares		
Humanities	General Nonfiction	Reginald Laubin		American Indian dances and their importance to Indian culture		
Humanities	General Nonfiction	Ruthven Todd	Martha's Vineyard	Natural history of Martha's Vineyard	Also won in 1967	
Humanities	German and East European History	Herbert H. Rowen	Elmira College			
Humanities	German and Scandinavian Literature	Eli Sobel	California Institute of Technology	German popular literature of the 16th century		
Humanities	History of Science and Technology	Robert Edwin Schofield	University of Kansas		Also won in 1967	
Humanities	Iberian and Latin American History	Richard Herr	Yale University	History of Spain in the Napoleonic era, 1800-1814	Also won in 1984	
Humanities	Italian History	Edward Williamson	Wesleyan University	Poetry of Petrarch in Europe		
Humanities	Italian Literature	George Thomas Romani	Northwestern University			
Humanities	Linguistics	Yakov Malkiel	University of California, Berkeley	Theory of Romance etymology	Also won in 1948, 1966	
Humanities	Linguistics	Uriel Weinreich	Columbia University			
Humanities	Literary Criticism	Dorothy Van Ghent	Brandeis University	European novelists in 19th and 20th centuries		
Humanities	Medieval History	Benoît Lacroix	University of Montreal	Historians of the Middle Ages		
Humanities	Music Research	Richard H. Hoppin	University of Texas	Early 15th century Cypriot-French music		
Humanities	Music Research	Carleen M. Hutchins		Experimentation in measuring the quality of string instruments	Also won in 1962	
Humanities	Music Research	Lawrence Morton	Ojai Festivals	Igor Stravinsky	Also won in 1960	
Humanities	Music Research	Claude Victor Palisca	University of Illinois	Humanism in Italian musical thought in the 15th and 16th centuries	Also won in 1981	
Humanities	Music Research	Boris Schwarz	Queens College			
Humanities	Near Eastern Studies	George Georgiades-Arnakis	University of Texas	Establishment of the Seljuk and Ottoman Turks in Asia Minor		
Humanities	Near Eastern Studies	Walter Fischel	University of California, Berkeley	Jews in India and Asia		
Humanities	Near Eastern Studies	Theodor Gaster	Dropsie College	Religious community of the Samaritans	Also won in 1954	
Humanities	Near Eastern Studies	Nahum Norbert Glatzer	Brandeis University	Jewish literature and scholarship		
Humanities	Philosophy	George Kimball Plochmann	Southern Illinois University	Philosophy of Ludwig Wittgenstein		
Humanities	Philosophy	Hilary Putnam	Princeton University	Role of necessary truths in theoretical science, especially the nature of mathematical knowledge		
Humanities	Philosophy	Morris Weitz	Ohio State University	Hamlet		
Humanities	Religion	Horton Davies	Princeton University	History of Christian worship in England from 1750 to 1950	Also won in 1964	
Humanities	Religion	Robert McQueen Grant	University of Chicago		Also won in 1950, 1953	
Humanities	Religion	James Moody Gustafson	Yale University Divinity School	Significance of the work of Jesus Christ for moral life	Also won in 1967	
Humanities	Religion	Hugh Thomson Kerr	Princeton University	Bearing of symbolism upon the development of religious ideas		
Humanities	Religion	Krister Stendahl	Harvard Divinity School	Emergence of Christianity out of Judaic origins	Also won in 1974	
Humanities	Religion	Kenneth W. Underwood	Wesleyan University	Ethical significance of the new social and political functions of American businessmen		
Humanities	Renaissance History	William James Bouwsma	University of California, Berkeley	Fra Paolo Sarpi		
Humanities	Renaissance History	Eugene F. Rice Jr.	Cornell University	Jacques Lefevre d'Etaples		
Humanities	Russian History	Leopold H. Haimson	University of Chicago			
Humanities	Russian History	Victor S. Mamatey	Florida State University	Work on a companion volume to his book on the World War on diplomacy of the United States in East Central Europe		
Humanities	Russian History	Marc Szeftel	Cornell University	Constitutional development of the Russian monarchy from 1905 to 1917		
Humanities	Russian History	Eduard Táborský	University of Texas	First decade of the Communist experiment in Czechoslovakia, 1948-1958		
Humanities	Slavic Literature	James Ferrell	University of Michigan	Comparative studies in grammar of Slavic languages		
Humanities	Slavic Literature	George Gibian	Smith College	Russian and French fiction		
Humanities	Slavic Literature	Milada Součková	Harvard University	Modern Czech literature		
Humanities	Spanish and Portuguese Literature	Gustavo Correa	University of Pennsylvania	Religious symbolism in Benito Perez Galdos' novels		
Humanities	Spanish and Portuguese Literature	John C. Dowling	Texas Technological College	Leandro Fernández de Moratín		
Humanities	Spanish and Portuguese Literature	Elias L. Rivers	Dartmouth College	Complete works of Garcilaso de la Vega		
Humanities	Spanish and Portuguese Literature	Eloise Roach	Austin High School	Work on two books: a translation of work by Juan Ramon Jimenez and a translation of works of Latin American poets		
Humanities	Spanish and Portuguese Literature	Bruce W. Wardropper	Ohio State University	Elegy in Spanish literature	Also won in 1952	
Humanities	Theatre Arts	Philip H. Highfill, Jr.	George Washington University	Biographical study of performers on the London stage between 1720 and 1801		
Humanities	Theatre Arts	Basil Langton	Boston University, Manhattan School of Music	Stagecraft of George Bernard Shaw		
Humanities	Theatre Arts	Richard A. Moody	Indiana University	American plays and actors on the 19th century English stage		
Humanities	United States History	Gerald M. Capers	Tulane University	New Orleans in the American Civil War		
Humanities	United States History	Noble E. Cunningham Jr.	University of Richmond	Practical operation of the Jeffersonian Republican Party, 1801-1809		
Humanities	United States History	Alexander DeConde	University of Michigan	Diplomatic and political history of Franco-American relations, 1797-1801	Also won in 1967	
Humanities	United States History	Don E. Fehrenbacher	Stanford University	State-making process in American history	Also won in 1984	
Humanities	United States History	Shelby Foote		American Civil War	Also won in 1955, 1956	
Humanities	United States History	Dewey W. Grantham, Jr.	Vanderbilt University	Progressive movement in the South from 1900 to 1920		
Humanities	United States History	Morton Keller	University of Pennsylvania	Political and social influence of the large American life insurance companies, 1890-1910		
Humanities	United States History	Horace Samuel Merrill	University of Maryland	Nature of the role of American political conservatives and conservatism, 1896-1912		
Humanities	United States History	Samuel Milner	United States Air Force Office of Scientific Research	Fall of Java in World War II and the fate of its American defenders		
Humanities	United States History	Chase Curran Mooney	Indiana University	William H. Crawford		
Humanities	United States History	Charles K. O'Neill		Kentucky neutrality during 1861 and 1862	Also won in 1958	
Humanities	United States History	Charles P. Roland	Tulane University	Albert Sidney Johnston		
Humanities	United States History	Philip Van Doren Stern				
Humanities	United States History	Reynold Millard Wik	Mills College	Impact of Henry Ford's thinking on American farmers		
Humanities	United States History	Oscar Osburn Winther	Indiana University	History of the American frontier		
Humanities	United States History	C. Vann Woodward	Johns Hopkins University	Reconstruction in the South after the Civil War, 1865-1877	Also won in 1945	
Natural Sciences	Applied Mathematics	Lawrence E. Malvern	Michigan State University	Nonuniform straining of materials with a definite yield point under dynamic loading		
Natural Sciences	Applied Mathematics	Otto J. M. Smith	University of California, Berkeley	Optimum design of systems with unalterable elements and uncontrollable disturbances		
Natural Sciences	Applied Mathematics	Ivan S. Sokolnikoff	California Institute of Technology	Linear theory of elasticity	Also won in 1952	
Natural Sciences	Applied Mathematics	Tchen Chan-Mou	Bureau of Standards, Howard University	Plasma physics and magnetohydrodynamics		
Natural Sciences	Applied Mathematics	Chia-Shun Yih	University of Michigan	Comparative study of stratified flows, rotational flows and flows in a magnetic field		
Natural Sciences	Astronomy and Astrophysics	Kinsey Anderson	State University of Iowa	High energy particles in solarterrestial processes		
Natural Sciences	Astronomy and Astrophysics	Thomas Michael Donahue	University of Pittsburgh	Sodium twilight airglow		
Natural Sciences	Chemistry	Bernard M. Abraham	Argonne National Laboratory	Liquid helium		
Natural Sciences	Chemistry	John G. Aston	Penn State	Rotation and migration in the solid state		
Natural Sciences	Chemistry	Marshall Fixman	Harvard University	Diffusion constant of simple liquids in terms of intermolecular force potential		
Natural Sciences	Chemistry	Clifford S. Garner	University of California, Los Angeles	Kinetics and mechanisms of substitution reactions of transition metal complexes		
Natural Sciences	Chemistry	Sidney Golden	Brandeis University	Quantum mechanical foundations of chemical reaction rate theory		
Natural Sciences	Chemistry	William Lee Jolly	University of California, Berkeley	Chemical bonds and their properties		
Natural Sciences	Chemistry	Nelson J. Leonard	University of Illinois	Chemistry of natural products, especially alkaloids	Also won in 1967	
Natural Sciences	Chemistry	Richard C. Lord	Massachusetts Institute of Technology	Biophysics		
Natural Sciences	Chemistry	Howard V. Malmstadt	University of Illinois	New quantitatives emission spectrochemical techniques		
Natural Sciences	Chemistry	Stuart A. Rice	University of Illinois	Statistical theory of transport phenomena in dense media		
Natural Sciences	Chemistry	John Ross	Brown University			
Natural Sciences	Chemistry	Walter A. Schroeder	California Institute of Technology	Total structure of human hemoglobin		
Natural Sciences	Chemistry	Gilbert Stork	Columbia University			
Natural Sciences	Chemistry	Milton Tamres	University of Michigan	Saturated cyclic compounds		
Natural Sciences	Chemistry	Harry H. Wasserman	Yale University	Use of nuclear magnetic resonance spectroscopy in the determination of structure of natural products		
Natural Sciences	Earth Science	William H. Easton	University of Southern California	Carboniferous paleontology and stratigraphy in Europe		
Natural Sciences	Earth Science	Charles Meyer	University of California, Berkeley	Types of copper deposits in Africa and Europe		
Natural Sciences	Earth Science	Ben M. Page	Stanford University	Gravity tectonics in southern Europe		
Natural Sciences	Earth Science	Arie Poldervaart	Columbia University	Origin of rocks and rock formations		
Natural Sciences	Earth Science	Francis John Turner	University of California, Berkeley	Field of metamorphic petrology	Also won in 1950	
Natural Sciences	Earth Science	George Veronis	Woods Hole Oceanographic Institute	Mathematical fluid dynamics	Also won in 1966	
Natural Sciences	Engineering	Andreas Acrivos	University of California, Berkeley	Basic aspects of fluid mechanics, and heat and mass transfer	Also won in 1976	
Natural Sciences	Engineering	Frederick A. Brooks	University of California, Davis	Field of agricultural micro-climatology		
Natural Sciences	Engineering	Hermann A. Haus	Massachusetts Institute of Technology	Magnetohydrodynamics		
Natural Sciences	Engineering	Guy M. Pound	Carnegie Tech	Theory relating to kinetics of processes involving point and line imperfections in solid lattices		
Natural Sciences	Genetics	Allan B. Burdick	Purdue University	Irradiation quantitative genetics in Drosophila		
Natural Sciences	Geography and Environmental Studies	W. Barclay Kamb	California Institute of Technology	Relation between state of stress and preferred orientation of ice crystals in selected glaciers of the Alps	Also won in 1961	
Natural Sciences	Geography and Environmental Studies	James Jerome Parsons	University of California, Berkeley	Woodland utilization and the herding economy of southern Spain and Portugal		
Natural Sciences	Mathematics	Lipman Bers	New York University		Also won in 1978	
Natural Sciences	Mathematics	Bertram Kostant	University of California, Berkeley	Fields of algebraic geometry, and Lie theory		
Natural Sciences	Mathematics	Lynn H. Loomis	Harvard University	Abstract analysis		
Natural Sciences	Mathematics	Monroe H. Martin	University of Maryland	Uniqueness of solutions to linear and non-linear boundary problems for partial differential equations		
Natural Sciences	Mathematics	Teruhisa Matsusaka	Northwestern University			
Natural Sciences	Medicine and Health	Harry W. Fritts Jr.	Bellevue Hospital			
Natural Sciences	Medicine and Health	Jack D. McCarthy	University Hospital	Endocrine diseases and hormone-linked cancers		
Natural Sciences	Molecular and Cellular Biology	Morton I. Dolin	Oak Ridge National Laboratory	Nucleic acid function and synthesis in micro-organisms		
Natural Sciences	Molecular and Cellular Biology	Eric Ellenbogen	University of Pittsburgh	Hydrogen bonds in the mechanism of action of trypsin		
Natural Sciences	Molecular and Cellular Biology	Robert Norman Feinstein	Argonne National Laboratory	Cathepsins relative to irradiation		
Natural Sciences	Molecular and Cellular Biology	Norman H. Giles	Yale University	Chemically induced mutations in neurospora crassa affecting the enzyme adenylosuccinase	Also won in 1965	
Natural Sciences	Molecular and Cellular Biology	Clarke T. Gray	Leonard Wood Memorial, Harvard Medical School	Metabolism		
Natural Sciences	Molecular and Cellular Biology	Irwin Clyde Gunsalus	University of Illinois	Biological systems at the molecular level	Also won in 1949, 1967	
Natural Sciences	Molecular and Cellular Biology	Lowell P. Hager	Harvard University	Biological studies		
Natural Sciences	Molecular and Cellular Biology	Douglas Alfred Marsland	New York University		Also won in 1951	
Natural Sciences	Molecular and Cellular Biology	Pauline A. Miller	Harvard Medical School	Tetanus toxin	Also won in 1958	
Natural Sciences	Molecular and Cellular Biology	Clark Phares Read	Johns Hopkins University			
Natural Sciences	Molecular and Cellular Biology	Austen Riggs II	University of Texas	Biochemistry of hemoglobin		
Natural Sciences	Molecular and Cellular Biology	S. J. Singer	Yale University	Localization of particular proteins and other substances within cells		
Natural Sciences	Molecular and Cellular Biology	Ben E. Sheffy	Cornell University	Nutritional factors affecting the host-virus relationship at the cellular level		
Natural Sciences	Molecular and Cellular Biology	Thomas Peter Singer	Edsel B. Ford Institute for Medical Research	Cytochrome-reducing dehydrogenases	Also won in 1951	
Natural Sciences	Molecular and Cellular Biology	Jen Tsi Yang	American Viscose Corporation	Protein configurations in non-aqueous media		
Natural Sciences	Organismic Biology and Ecology	Hans Abplanalp	University of California, Davis	Role of inbreeding effects in closed interbreeding populations		
Natural Sciences	Organismic Biology and Ecology	John Davis	University of California, San Diego	Arizona and Strickland's woodpeckers		
Natural Sciences	Organismic Biology and Ecology	James Norman Dent	University of Virginia			
Natural Sciences	Organismic Biology and Ecology	Theodosius Dobzhansky	Columbia University			
Natural Sciences	Organismic Biology and Ecology	Frederick Ernest Joseph Fry	University of Toronto	Environmental physiology		
Natural Sciences	Organismic Biology and Ecology	Philip Strong Humphrey	Yale University	Anatomy and development of the trachea and associated structure of Argentine waterfowl		
Natural Sciences	Organismic Biology and Ecology	Paul David Hurd, Jr.	University of California, Berkeley	Studies of the New World carpenter bees		
Natural Sciences	Organismic Biology and Ecology	Ernest Albert Lachner	United States National Museum	Certain tropical marine fish families	Also won in 1955	
Natural Sciences	Organismic Biology and Ecology	John Alexander Moore	Columbia University			
Natural Sciences	Organismic Biology and Ecology	Colin Pittendrigh	Princeton University	Cells as living clocks		
Natural Sciences	Organismic Biology and Ecology	Charles G. Sibley	Cornell University	Recent research in avian biology		
Natural Sciences	Organismic Biology and Ecology	John Philip Trinkaus	Yale University	Stability of cell type in differentiating epidermal cells		
Natural Sciences	Physics	Robert Adolph Becker	University of Illinois Urbana-Champaign	Nuclear synthesis in the stars	Also won in 1958	
Natural Sciences	Physics	Felix Bloch	Stanford University	Relaxation processes and their extension to applications at low temperatures		
Natural Sciences	Physics	Richard Raymond Carlson	State University of Iowa	Analyzing work done in low energy nuclear physics research at the state university		
Natural Sciences	Physics	Arthur H. Compton	Washington University in St. Louis		Also won in 1926, 1955	
Natural Sciences	Physics	Michael Danos	National Bureau of Standards	Quantum mechanical foundation of the phenomenological theory of the photonuclear giant resonance		
Natural Sciences	Physics	Robert Jay Finkelstein	University of California, Los Angeles	Elementary particle theory		
Natural Sciences	Physics	Andrew V. Granato	University of Illinois	Applications of finite strain theory to perfect and nearly perfect crystals		
Natural Sciences	Physics	Paul V. C. Hough	University of Michigan	Techniques important in high energy nuclear physics and strange particle physics	Also won in 1973	
Natural Sciences	Physics	Karl Uno Ingard	Massachusetts Institute of Technology	Plasma physics		
Natural Sciences	Physics	James A. Krumhansl	National Carbon Company	Theory of thermal, electrical, and thermoelectric transport		
Natural Sciences	Physics	Willard Libby	United States Atomic Energy Commission	Physical inorganic chemistry	Also won in 1941, 1951	
Natural Sciences	Physics	Boyce McDaniel	Cornell University	Elementary particle interaction using high energy X-rays		
Natural Sciences	Physics	Richard H. Milburn	Harvard University	Experimental physics		
Natural Sciences	Physics	Donald J. Montgomery	Michigan State University	Fundamental processes involved in static electrification of solids		
Natural Sciences	Physics	Louis Shreve Osborne	Massachusetts Institute of Technology	High energy physics		
Natural Sciences	Physics	Wolfgang K. H. Panofsky	Stanford University	High energy physics	Also won in 1973	
Natural Sciences	Physics	William Paul	Harvard University	Techniques of high pressures		
Natural Sciences	Physics	Vincent Zetterberg Peterson	California Institute of Technology	Photoproduction of mesons and hyperons by high energy X-rays		
Natural Sciences	Physics	Louis Rosen	Los Alamos National Laboratory	Spin-orbit force in nucleon-nucleus elastic scattering		
Natural Sciences	Physics	Robert G. Sachs	University of Wisconsin	Theoretical studies in particle physics		
Natural Sciences	Physics	John A. Sauer	Penn State	High polymers in relation to molecular structure		
Natural Sciences	Physics	John P. Schiffer	Argonne National Laboratory	Average properties of nuclear energy levels		
Natural Sciences	Physics	Carl M. York, Jr.	University of Chicago			
Natural Sciences	Physics	Thomas J. Ypsilantis	University of California, Berkeley	Theoretical study of the nucleon-nucleon force problem		
Natural Sciences	Plant Science	Donovan Stewart Correll	Texas Research Foundation		Also won in 1946	
Natural Sciences	Plant Science	Jack R. Harlan				
Natural Sciences	Plant Science	Paul Clifford Hutchison	University of California, Berkeley	Cacti of Peru		
Natural Sciences	Plant Science	Robert A. Nilan	Washington State College	Action of various mutagens on chromosome breakage in seeds		
Natural Sciences	Plant Science	Karl Sax	Harvard University	Physiology of tree dwarfing		
Natural Sciences	Plant Science	Richard C. Starr	Indiana University	Sexual reproduction in algae		
Natural Sciences	Plant Science	Edward C. Stone	University of California, Berkeley	Naturalization of Monterey pine in the Southern Hemisphere		
Natural Sciences	Plant Science	Frederick Whatley	University of California, Berkeley	Role of Krebs cycle enzymes in photosynthesis		
Natural Sciences	Statistics	Allan Birnbaum	Columbia University			
Natural Sciences	Statistics	Leo A. Goodman	University of Chicago			
Social Sciences	Anthropology and Cultural Studies	Katharine Luomala	University of Hawaii	Polynesian and Micronesian anthropology	Also won in 1955	
Social Sciences	Anthropology and Cultural Studies	Richard C. Rudolph	California Institute of Technology	Chinese archaeology, from early to modern times	Also won in 1952	
Social Sciences	Economics	Francis M. Bator	Massachusetts Institute of Technology	Investment allocation in low-income countries		
Social Sciences	Economics	M. Gardner Clark	Cornell University	Labor productivity in the iron and steel industry with main emphasis on the USSR in comparison to the US and other selected countries		
Social Sciences	Economics	Alfred H. Conrad	Harvard University	Inequality of incomes		
Social Sciences	Economics	Otto Eckstein	Harvard University	Interrelationship of fiscal policies and growth of American economy		
Social Sciences	Economics	Robert Eisner	Northwestern University			
Social Sciences	Economics	Bert F. Hoselitz	University of Chicago			
Social Sciences	Economics	Vernon H. Jensen	Cornell University	Practices of hiring and conditions of employment among dock workers at certain European ports compared to the Port of New York		
Social Sciences	Economics	Frederic Meyers	University of California, Los Angeles	Legal and institutional protection of individual job security in advanced industrial societies		
Social Sciences	Economics	Andreas G. Papandreou	University of California, Berkeley	Organizational variables in economic development		
Social Sciences	Economics	Lloyd B. Saville	Duke University	Local financial developments in Turin, Italy during the past four centuries		
Social Sciences	Economics	Gerald G. Somers	University of Wisconsin	Comparative rates and patterns of labor mobility in Britain, France and the United States		
Social Sciences	Law	Joseph M. Snee	Georgetown University Law School	Military justice		
Social Sciences	Political Science	Donald Dewey	Duke University	History of economic ideas in the United States Supreme Court		
Social Sciences	Political Science	William S. Livingston	University of Texas	Decision-making process in British politics		
Social Sciences	Political Science	Robert G. McCloskey	Harvard University	Political pamphleteers in English and American history		
Social Sciences	Political Science	Lennox Algernon Mills	University of Minnesota		Also won in 1936, 1957	
Social Sciences	Political Science	Eugene V. Rostow	Yale University	United States antitrust laws		
Social Sciences	Political Science	Judith N. Shklar	Harvard University	Modern legal theory		
Social Sciences	Political Science	Herbert Spiro	Harvard University	Constitutional politics of Rhodesia and Nyasaland		
Social Sciences	Psychology	Theodore Newcomb	University of Michigan	Social psychology, with particular reference to the acquaintance process		
Social Sciences	Psychology	William Robert Thompson	Wesleyan University	Prenatal development from a behavioral standpoint		
Social Sciences	Sociology	Robert Galen Burnight	University of Connecticut	Relation between internal migration and industrialization in Mexico during the last 30 years		
Social Sciences	Sociology	Milton M. Gordon	Wellesley College	Girard College case		
Social Sciences	Sociology	Adolph S. Tomars	City College of New York	History of opera in the US and abroad		

== 1959 Latin American and Caribbean oFellows ==
Category	Field of Study	Fellow	Institutional association	Research topic	Notes	Ref
Creative Arts	Fiction	Victor Stafford Reid		Novel writing		
Creative Arts	Fine Arts	Marcelo Silvestre Bonevardi			Also won in 1958	
Creative Arts	Fine Arts	María Luisa Pacheco		Bolivian art and landscape	Also won in 1958, 1960	
Creative Arts	Music Composition	Luis Antonio Escobar		Composing	Also won in 1958	
Humanities	General Nonfiction	Rosa Chacel			Also won in 1960	
Humanities	Spanish and Portuguese Literature	Raimundo Lida	Harvard University	Religious and philosophical thought of Francisco de Quevedo	Also won in 1939	
Natural Sciences	Mathematics	Juan Jorge Schäffer	Universidad de la República			
Natural Sciences	Molecular and Cellular Biology	Mitzy Canessa			Also won in 1961	
Natural Sciences	Molecular and Cellular Biology	Angel O. Pogo			Also won in 1960	
Natural Sciences	Molecular and Cellular Biology	Rodrigo Zeledón Araya	University of Costa Rica	Research at Johns Hopkins University	Also won in 1956, 1958	
Natural Sciences	Neuroscience	Pablo Rudomín Zevnovaty			Also won in 1968	
Natural Sciences	Organismic Biology and Ecology	Herminio R. Rabanal		Fish culture in fresh water ponds	Also won in 1957	
Natural Sciences	Organismic Biology and Ecology	Pedro Wygodzinsky			Also won in 1954	
Natural Sciences	Plant Science	Ernesto Foldats Andins	Central University of Venezuela		Also won in 1958	
Natural Sciences	Plant Science	Sebastian Alberto Guarrera				
Natural Sciences	Plant Science	Eduardo Quisumbing	National Museum of Natural History, Manila		Also won in 1958	
Natural Sciences	Plant Science	Oscar Tovar			Also won in 1960	

== See also ==
- Guggenheim Fellowship
- List of Guggenheim Fellowships awarded in 1958
- List of Guggenheim Fellowships awarded in 1960
