= Leslie Weatherhead =

Man of reason

The Reverend Leslie Weatherhead CBE
- Weatherhead in 1936
- Title: President of the Methodist Conference

Personal life
- Born: Leslie Dixon Weatherhead; 14 October 1893 London, England
- Died: 5 January 1976 (aged 82)

Religious life
- Religion: Nonconformist Christianity
- Church: City Temple, London (1936–1960)

Senior posting
- Period in office: 1955–1956
- Predecessor: W. Russel Shearer
- Successor: Harold Crawford Walters

Leslie Dixon Weatherhead CBE (14 October 1893 – 5 January 1976) was an English Christian theologian in the liberal Protestant tradition. Weatherhead was noted for his preaching ministry at City Temple in London and for his books, including The Will of God, The Christian Agnostic, and Psychology, Religion, and Healing.

== Life ==
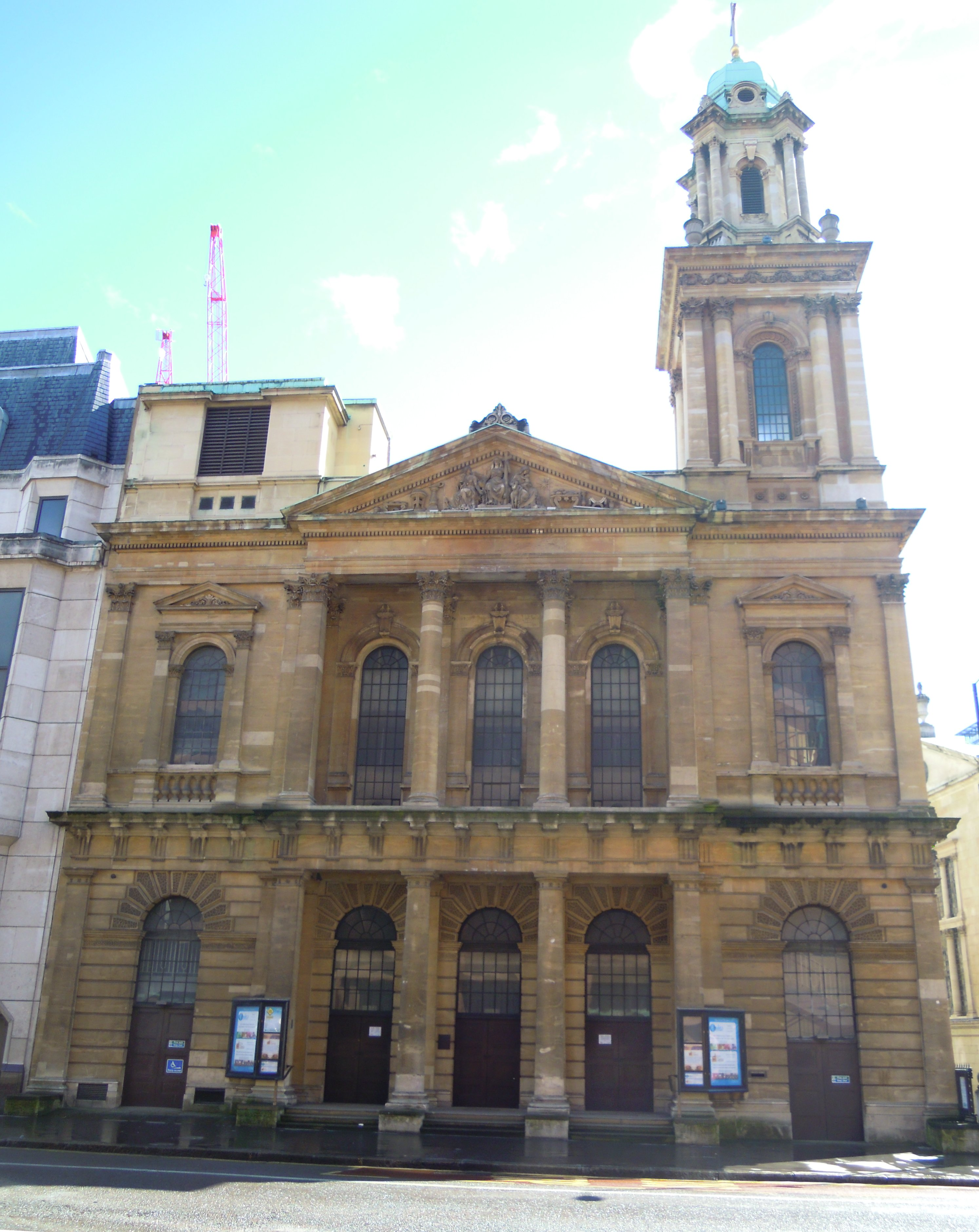
The City Temple, where Weatherhead ministered for several decades, was rebulilt in 1958 under his direction

Weatherhead was born in London in 1893. He trained for the Wesleyan Methodist ministry at Richmond Theological College, in south-west London. The First World War cut short his training, and he became Methodist minister at Farnham, Surrey, in September 1915. After serving in India, Manchester, and Leeds, Weatherhead became the minister of the City Temple, a Congregational Church on Holborn Viaduct in London. He served there from 1936 until his retirement in 1960. From 1930 till 1939, Weatherhead was a member of Frank Buchman's Oxford Group and wrote several books reflecting the group's values, including Discipleship and The Will of God. He often symbolised the "head" of the Oxford Group London.

His book This is the Victory was first printed in 1940 (preface dated November 1940) and reprinted in March 1942. In the period of time between these two editions, the City Temple was "gutted by fire from incendiary bombs dropped from enemy aeroplanes". He was able to continue his ministry thanks to the nearby Anglican St Sepulchre-without-Newgate church. After the war, Weatherhead raised the funds to rebuild the City Temple, largely from John D. Rockefeller. The City Temple is now a congregation of the United Reformed Church.

Despite opposition, Weatherhead was elected as President of the Methodist Conference for 1955–1956. The re-built City Temple was opened in the presence of Queen Elizabeth The Queen Mother in October 1958. In the 1959 New Year Honours he was appointed a Commander of the Order of the British Empire (CBE). In 1960, Weatherhead retired to live at Bexhill-on-Sea. He died in 1976.

The three books of his sermons which Weatherhead considered his best were That Immortal Sea, Over His Own Signature and Key Next Door.

Three biographies of Leslie Weatherhead have appeared: in 1960, for young people, Dr. Leslie Weatherhead of the City Temple by Christopher Maitland; in 1975 Leslie Weatherhead: A Personal Portrait by his son A. Kingsley Weatherhead, a professor of English; and most recently in 1999 Doctor of Souls: Leslie D. Weatherhead 1893–1976 by John C. Travell.

== Theology ==
Weatherhead is identified as a liberal Christian. He believed in a God whom he felt most comfortable referring to as "Father." He felt that the Creator was higher on a scale of values, but that God must also be personal enough to interact in a direct relationship with people. Weatherhead understood that God cared for humankind, but that some would find this difficult (since suffering exists in the world). If "God is love" it would be difficult to deny God's Providence.

Weatherhead's concept of the divinity of Christ was that Jesus stood in a special relationship with God and was "indeed an incarnation of God in a fuller sense than any other known Being." Weatherhead affirmed the belief that the New Testament never teaches that Jesus is God, nor that Jesus taught this, observing that Jesus preferred to refer to himself as the Son of Man. He believed the idea of Jesus being "the only begotten son" of God was impossible - and that such information is not presently available. The virgin birth was not an issue for Weatherhead, having (in his view) never been a major tenet for being a follower of Christ. Moreover, he claimed that the New Testament traces Jesus' lineage through his father Joseph, not Mary, to show that he descended from the house of David. Weatherhead claimed that Jesus never said he was sinless. He comments that Jesus sometimes showed anger, especially to false teachers, that he cursed a fig tree because it didn't produce fruit and rebuked Peter, one of his closest disciples, which Weatherhead interprets as Jesus calling Peter Satan. Weatherhead taught that many theologians assumed Jesus' sinlessness because of his moral superiority, but that Jesus never made that claim for himself. Weatherhead was in agreement with Nathaniel Micklem, whom he quoted, that the blood sacrifice of Jesus was unnecessary for forgiveness of sins. For Micklem (and subsequently for Weatherhead), it was a perversion of God to suppose that "God did not and could not forgive sins apart from the death of Christ." According to Weatherhead, that sacrifice merely revealed something of God's nature that made one want to be forgiven.

As for the Holy Spirit, Weatherhead confessed agnosticism. "Few Christians, whom I know, think of the Holy Spirit as a separate Person," he said. Disagreeing with the historic Christian creeds, he taught that such a view would equate to worshiping two gods instead of one.

His view of the church was an idealistic one. The church on earth should copy the divine original, in which all who loved Christ would be joined together to "worship and move forward to the unimaginable unity with God which is his will."

=== Virgin birth ===
Irish reformed minister Ian Paisley, later Lord Bannside, denounced Weatherhead in a 1969 sermon as "the man that said that Jesus Christ was the bastard son of Zechariah (John the Baptist's father) – and Mary, who was a prostitute of the temple.... That is about as vile a thing as anybody could say." He called Weatherhead "an arch-apostate", whose place was "in hell".

In his own view, Weatherhead had made every effort to present Mary as a very pure and sincere (if immature) young maiden—who had simply misinterpreted the Angel's Annunciation as a divine instruction to go and stay for three months with her cousin's husband, Zechariah—and that was when Jesus was conceived. Weatherhead considered it significant that the Gospels do not record Jesus saying his mother had conceived him without a human father.

Encountering it in Weatherhead's The Christian Agnostic, Unificationist theologian Young Oon Kim said it as the best explanation of the birth of Jesus in her book Unification Theology. Christian author Ruth A. Tucker comments in her book Another Gospel: "Kim's Christology is a prime example of liberal theology.... By diminishing the role of Jesus, Kim paves the way for the exaltation of Sun Myung Moon."

=== Scripture ===
Weatherhead taught that the Bible is a collection of works that progressively reveal man's search for and understanding of God, culminated in the best representation of God's true nature in Jesus Christ. He was critical of many passages, including some from Leviticus, Numbers, and Deuteronomy, that he claimed went against Jesus teaching, stating that "some of the passages of Browning are of far superior spiritual value." Weatherhead rejected interpretations of the Bible that relied on eternal conscious torture, instead holding an alternate view of 'the gospel of Christ', which he interpreted as the spirit of "love, liberty, gaiety, forgiveness, joy and acceptance."

== Reception ==
Weatherhead was a highly controversial figure on account of his questioning of some of the central tenets of the Christian faith—he once said he regarded "creeds and confessions of faith" as "museum specimens"—and his incorporation into Christianity of elements from other religions and from spiritualism.

In the view of Professor David D. Larsen, of Trinity Evangelical Divinity School, "Weatherhead jettisoned historical Christianity". He denied the Atonement and the efficacy of the Blood of Christ in A Plain Man Looks at the Cross, and the bodily Resurrection of Christ in The Manner of the Resurrection in the Light of Modern Science and Psychical Research. He dismissed the virgin birth, was inclined to believe that Zechariah was the father of Jesus, thought that the "legion" of demons probably meant that the man had been molested as a child by Roman legionnaires, and regarded the Apostle Paul as hopelessly neurotic. Weatherhead regularly attended spiritist séances, at one of which John Wesley appeared to him. In 1957 he gave a lecture to the City Temple Literary Society on "The Case for Reincarnation". He continued to advocate reincarnation for the rest of his life in books like The Christian Agnostic and Life Begins at Death.

According to historian Horton Davies, Weatherhead was "unrivalled as a twentieth-century physician of souls and preacher of the integration of personality through Christ". Professor Larsen, while agreeing that Weatherhead was "a brilliant preacher", judges his sermons, however, to be theologically "vacuous and empty". Weatherhead, he writes, was perhaps the most striking example in the British Isles of "the increasing horizontalization and psychologization of the sermon", a tendency wittily characterised by E. Brooks Holifield as "From Salvation to Self-Realization". Weatherhead's scorn for theology—he claimed that poets had more insight than theologians—and penchant for "preaching as psychotherapy" made him, in Larsen's view, "a tragic instance in which psychical research replaced 'sound doctrine'". Even his psychology, which drew on fringe thinkers as well as more mainstream figures like Freud, is now "severely dated. No one today talks about Odic force and the leakage of psychic energy. His 55 books are virtually unread today."

John Taylor, reviewing Doctor of Souls states that "[Weatherhead's] writings still have an impact on Churches today, and Christians read and re-read his works". Nevertheless, though Weatherhead was a "great man", he "remains an enigma.... His name and ministry still enable passions to arise, depending how you see him." As Minister of "a supra-denominational church" like the City Temple, "he was largely free to follow his own agenda", which he did, "not accepting the doctrine of the Virgin Birth, nor being comfortable with the doctrine of the Trinity". He was "a rebel, breaking out from the confines of Methodism", and impossible to imagine "in a traditional Congregational church".

== Works ==
Weatherhead wrote many books, including:

- After Death: A Popular Statement of the Modern Christian View of Life Beyond the Grave (1923).
- The Old Testament and Today (with J.A.Chapman) (1923).
- What we believe to-day about the Old Testament (1924).
- The Transforming Friendship. A Book about Jesus and Ourselves (1928).
- Healing the Soul (1929).
- The After-world of the Poets: The Contribution of Victorian Poets to the Development of the Idea of Immortality (1929).
- Psychology in Service of the Soul (1929).
- The Transforming Friendship: A Book about Jesus and Ourselves (1929).
- Jesus and Ourselves: A Sequel to The Transforming Friendship (1930).
- The Presence of Jesus (1930).
- The Mastery of Sex Through Psychology and Religion (1931).
- Every Man's Hour of Destiny. A Message to the Disappointed. (1931)
- His Life and Ours: The Significance for Us of the Life of Jesus (1932).
- The Strength of Christian Confidence (1932).
- Pain and Providence (1932).
- The Guarded Universe (1932).
- Discipleship (1934).
- How Can I Find God? (1933).
- Psychology and Life (1934).
- Psychology and the Cure of Souls (1934)
- Why Do Men Suffer? (1935).
- Discipleship (1935)
- It Happened in Palestine (1936).
- Through the Year with Leslie D. Weatherhead (1936)
- A Shepherd Remembers: A Devotional Study of the Twenty-third Psalm (1937).
- The Eternal Voice (1939).
- The Mystery of Pain (1939).
- Thinking Aloud in War-Time: An Attempt to see the Present Situation in the Light of the Christian Faith (1939).
- This Is the Victory (1940).
- Things Which Cannot be Shaken (1940)
- Guarding our Sunday (1941)
- Psychology in the Service of the Soul (1941).
- Personalities of the Passion (1942).
- This is the Victory (1943)
- In Quest Of A Kingdom (1943).
- The Will of God (1944).
- A Plain Man Looks at the Cross (1945).
- The Significance of Silence and Other Sermons (1945).
- Healing Through Prayer (1946)
- Holy Land (1948).
- The Resurrection and the Life (1948).
- When the Lamp Flickers: Radiant Answers to Life's More Perplexing Questions (1948).
- Psychology, Religion, and Healing (1951).
- That Immortal Sea: A Book of Sermons (1953).
- Over His Own Signature: A Devotional Study of Christ's Pictures of Himself and of Their Relevance to Our Lives Today (1955).
- Prescription for Anxiety (1956).
- A Private House of Prayer (1958).
- The Resurrection of Christ in the Light of Modern Science and Psychical Research (1959).
- Key Next Door and Other City Temple Sermons (1960).
- Salute To a Sufferer: An Attempt to Offer the Plain Man a Christian Philosophy of Suffering (1962).
- Wounded Spirits: Case Histories of Spiritual and Physical Healing (1962).
- The Christian Agnostic (1963). Wikiquote: The Christian Agnostic
- Time for God (1967).
- Life Begins at Death: Replies to Questions Put by Norman French (1969).
- The Busy Man's Old Testament (1971).

== Sources ==
- Davies, Horton (1963). Varieties of English Preaching, 1900–1960. SCM Press.
