= City Temple (disambiguation) =

City Temple can mean:

- Stadttempel, a synagogue in Vienna
- City Temple, London, a free church on Holborn Viaduct
- Salt Lake City Temple, a temple of LDS Church in Salt Lake City
- The City Temple in Revelation 21:19-20
- Salvation Army churches in many cities, including Brisbane, Canberra and Melbourne
- Angkor Wat (lit. 'City Temple' or 'City of Temples'), a Hindu-Buddhist temple complex in Cambodia
