= Albert Spaulding Cook =

American comparative literature scholar and poet (1925–1998)

Albert Spaulding Cook (October 28, 1925 – July 7, 1998) was a noted American literary critic, poet, classical scholar, teacher and translator. He taught Classics, English and Comparative Literature at the University of California, Berkeley, Western Reserve University, the University at Buffalo and Brown University, as well as at various universities abroad.

== Early life ==
Born in Exeter, New Hampshire, Cook spent much of his early childhood in Ohio and in Massachusetts. In the late 1930s, his family moved to Albany and in 1940 settled in Utica, New York. His parents separated when he was fourteen, his mother at first remaining in Utica and later moving to New York City, and his father moving to Boston. A brother, two years his junior, pursued a career in radio.

== Education ==
While in high school, Albert Cook ran the school's literary magazine, won an Atlantic Monthly student essay prize, and edited an anthology of Utica area poets. Some of his schoolmates, among them Aaron Rosen and Edwin Dolin, remained lifelong friends and collaborators; another, Carol Rubin, eventually became his wife. A gifted linguist from his earliest years, he learned Latin and taught himself Greek in high school; by the time he reached college, he was proficient also in French and German; he later added Hebrew and Russian. At the peak of his career, he spoke four languages and could read ten.

In 1943 he enrolled in Harvard College, where John Hawkes and Robert Creeley were among his classmates. His formal studies were chiefly in classics, with Arthur Darby Nock, Werner Jaeger and (above all) John Finley among his teachers. (Finley eventually recommended him for admission to the Harvard Society of Fellows.) He interrupted his undergraduate career in 1943–1944 with a brief stint in the armed services, but was discharged for health reasons after six months. In his senior year, he was awarded the Garrison Prize (Harvard's highest award for a poem by an undergraduate), as well as the Bowdoin Prize in Classical Greek and Latin and the John Osborne Sargent Prize for Latin Translation. He also published various poems under the pen-name of "Charles Hamilton Sorley". At his Harvard graduation in 1946, he delivered the Latin commencement oration.

Rather than proceeding immediately to graduate school, he lived for some months in poverty in the village of Sainte-Rose near Montreal, where he perfected his French and began drafting a series of works, including his first book, The Dark Voyage and the Golden Mean, which was to launch his career. He at this time also experienced a religious awakening which led to his conversion from liberal agnosticism to Anglican Christianity.

He returned to Harvard to complete his master's degree, chiefly under the mentorship of the renowned classicist Eric Havelock, and continued as a Harvard Junior Fellow, envisioning an eventual career outside academe as a lone wolf writer of poetry, drama and fiction. A prominent member of a group of young Harvard writers that included L. E. Sissman, Norman Wexler and Richard Wilbur, he founded the little magazine Halcyon (1947–1948), publishing work by himself and his friends alongside contributions from Wallace Stevens, James Merrill, Allen Ginsberg and E. E. Cummings. He also began working with Boston's Tributary Theater, which staged his translation of Sophocles' Oedipus Rex. In a revised form, this version of the play was several times republished in later years. Elected to the Harvard Society of Fellows, Cook continued to work on a variety of projects, and began publishing work in The Partisan Review.

He married Carol S. Rubin on June 19, 1948, and in the following spring took up residence on a Junior Fellow Study Grant in the Saint-Germain neighborhood of Paris. While in France, Cook attended lectures by Merleau-Ponty, Claude Lévi-Strauss and Jacques Lacan. His three sons were born in the years following his return and in 1951 the family moved to New York City. Still determined to become an independent writer and reluctant to commit to an academic career, Cook supported himself and his family by various odd jobs, from encyclopedia salesman to museum accountant, until fiscal rescue arrived once more in the form of a Fulbright grant to France.

== Career ==
Financial necessity finally persuaded him to accept the offer of a teaching position in the University of California, Berkeley. Told early on that his contract would not be renewed, he spent the remaining time of his teaching stint in learning Hebrew, before securing another Fulbright Fellowship, this time to the Ludwig-Maximilians-Universität München. When the Fulbright grant ended a year later, he accepted the offer of an appointment at Western Reserve University in Cleveland, Ohio. By this time, his works of criticism had gained a substantial reputation; also, his first volume of verse was published by the University of Arizona Press, and several of his plays were performed by experimental theaters in Cleveland and elsewhere. Two years later he was appointed Senior Fellow at the Center for Advanced Study in Behavioral Science at Stanford.

Meanwhile, in 1963, he assumed the chairmanship of the English Department in the University at Buffalo, a formerly private university which had just then become a flagship research institution of the State University of New York. His mandate was to substantially expand the Buffalo English department (it increased from fifty to almost eighty members in the first five years of his tenure) and to turn it into a cutting-edge, world-class literary institution. He was given free hand to hire and fire, and to bend or break conventional academic rules at his discretion. He used this freedom not only to hire a distinguished faculty (Lionel Abel, C.L. Barber, John Barth, Robert Creeley, Carl Dennis, Irving Feldman, Leslie Fiedler, René Girard, Mac Hammond, Norman Holland, Stanley Edgar Hyman, Bruce Jackson, John Logan, Ann London Scott, Charles Olson, Bill Sylvester and Dorothy Van Ghent all joined the faculty during his watch), but also to democratize the department by encouraging the breach of conventional barriers among period specialties, or between creative and scholarly, young and old, tenured and untenured, and even teachers and students. His presence was especially strong during the two sensational Buffalo Festivals of the Arts in 1965 and 1967, transpiring during a politically and ideologically explosive decade.

He also instituted a vigorous program of illustrious visitorships, usually during the summer sessions, which in the fifteen years of his tenure featured John Berryman, Jorge Luis Borges, Basil Bunting, Anthony Burgess, Kenneth Burke, Noam Chomsky, Leonard Cohen, Robert Duncan, Richard Ellman, William Empson, Henri Foucault, Robert Graves, John Hawkes, Roman Jakobson, Randall Jarrell, Hugh Kenner, Frank Kermode, Doris Lessing, Dwight Macdonald, Norman Mailer, Howard Nemerov, Frank O’Hara, John Crowe Ransom, Adrienne Rich, Louis Simpson, Tzvetan Todorov, John Updike, Richard Wilbur, Yevgeny Yevtushenko and many others. When a more conservative University administration took over (and the budget began to be squeezed) he continued to give generous support to academically adventurous initiatives that benefited a younger generation of faculty and graduate students destined for distinguished later careers (Robert Hass, J. M. Coetzee, Charles Baxter, Marc Schell, Carol Jacobs, Gerald O'Grady). His reformation of the Buffalo English Department was viewed by many as the single greatest achievement of his career. However, by the late 1970s, increasingly sidelined by an unsympathetic new University administration and hampered by tightening fiscal restraints, he accepted the offer of a distinguished professorship at Brown University, where he taught until his retirement in 1988. As an Emeritus, he kept energetically publishing and guest-lecturing until his sudden death of a heart attack a decade later. The Albert Spaulding Cook Prize at Brown University was established in his honor.

Cook died in Providence, Rhode Island, at the age of 72.

== Academic positions ==
- Harvard University: B.A. 1946, M.A. 1948
- Harvard Society of Fellows: 1948–1951
- Fulbright Fellow: 1952–1953 (University of Paris, France), 1956–1957 (Ludwig-Maximilians-Universität München); 1960–1961 (University of Vienna)
- University of California, Berkeley, California: Assistant Professor of English, 1953–1956
- Western Reserve University, Cleveland: Professor of Comparative Literature, 1957–1963
- Senior Fellow, Center for Advanced Study in the Behavioral Sciences (Stanford University), 19661966
- Department of English, State University of New York at Buffalo, New York: Chair and Professor of English, 1963–1966; Distinguished Professor, 1966–1978
- Summer Fellow, American Council of Learned Societies, 1968
- Fondation Hardt Research Scholar (Geneva): 1968, 1976, 1987
- Solomon Guggenheim Foundation Fellow: 1969–1970 (Paris)
- International Research and Exchange Fellow: 1972 (Russia)
- Camargo Foundation Residency: 1977
- Brown University, Providence, Rhode Island: Professor of Comparative Literature, English and Classics, 1978–1986; Ford Foundation Professor of Comparative *Literature 1986–1988
- Clare Hall, Cambridge University, Visiting Fellow: 1982
- Rockefeller Foundation Fellow: 1989 (Bellagio, Italy)
- American Academy in Rome, Visiting Fellow: 1991
- University of Bologna, Visiting Professor, 1997

== Published works ==
=== Criticism and literary theory ===
- The Dark Voyage and the Golden Mean: A Philosophy of Comedy (Cambridge, Massachusetts: Harvard University Press, 1949; reprinted by W. W. Norton, 1966), Library of Congress cat. no. PN1922.C6
- The Meaning of Fiction (Detroit: Wayne State University Press, 1960), Library of Congress cat. no. PN3451.C6
- The Classic Line: A Study in Epic Poetry (Bloomington, Indiana: Indiana University Press, 1966) ISBN 1112748121
- Prisms: Studies in Modern Literature (Bloomington, Indiana: Indiana University Press, 1967), Library of Congress cat. no. PN771.C6
- The Root of the Thing: A Study of Job and the Song of Songs (Bloomington, Indiana: Indiana University Press, 1968)
- Enactment: Greek Tragedy (Chicago: Swallow Press, 1971) ISBN 0804005397
- Shakespeare's Enactment: The Dynamics of Renaissance Theater (Chicago: Swallow Press, 1976) ISBN 0804006954
- Myth and Language (Bloomington, Indiana: Indiana University Press, 1980) ISBN 0253140277
- French Tragedy: The Power of Enactment (Chicago: Swallow Press, 1981) ISBN 0804005486
- Changing the Signs: The Fifteenth Century Breakthrough (Lincoln, Nebraska: University of Nebraska Press, 1985) ISBN 0803214251
- Figural Choice in Poetry and Art (Hanover, New Hampshire: Brown University Press, 1985) ISBN 9780874513332
- Thresholds, a Study of Some Aspects of Romanticism (Reading, Wisconsin: University of Wisconsin Press, 1985) ISBN 0299103005
- History/writing (New York: Cambridge University Press, 1988) ISBN 0521360498
- Dimensions of the Sign in Art (Hanover, New Hampshire: Brown University Press, 1989) ISBN 978-0874514483
- Soundings: On Shakespeare, Modern Poetry, Plato and Other Subjects (Detroit: Wayne State University Press, 1991) ISBN 0814323316
- Canons and Wisdoms (Philadelphia: University of Pennsylvania Press, 1993) ISBN 0812232046
- The Reach of Poetry (West Lafayette, Indiana: Purdue University Press) ISBN 9781557530691
- The Burden of Prophecy: Poetic Utterance and the Prophets of the Old Testament (Carbondale, Illinois: University of Southern Illinois Press, 1996) ISBN 0809320835
- The Stance of Plato (Lanham, Maryland: Littlefield Adams, 1996) ISBN 0822630494
- Temporalizing Space: The Triumphant Strategies of Piero della Francesca (New York: Peter Lang, 1992) ISBN 082041865X

=== Poetry ===
- Progressions (Phoenix, Arizona: The University of Arizona Press, 1963), Library of Congress cat. no.63-11976
- The Charges (Chicago: The Swallow Press, 1970, reprinted 1972), OCoLC 569280307
- Adapt the Living (Chicago: The Swallow Press, 1981) ISBN 0804003505
- Modulars: Poems on a New Metrical Principle (Lewiston, New York: Mellen Poetry Press, 1992), ISBN 0773495649
- Delayed Answers (Lewiston, New York: Mellen Poetry Press, 1992), ISBN 0773495665
- Modes (Lewiston, New York: Mellen Poetry Press, 1993), ISBN 0773427880
- Affability Blues (Lewiston, New York: Mellen Poetry Press, 1994), ISBN 0773427996
- Reasons for Waking (Lewiston, New York: Mellen Poetry Press, 1996, 2nd ed. 1998), ISBN 0773426744
- The Future Invests (Lewiston, New York: Mellen Poetry Press, 1997), ISBN 978-0773428164
- Haiku Poems (Lewiston, New York: Mellen Poetry Press, 1997), ISBN 0773428259
- A Sometime Master (Lewiston, New York: Mellen Poetry Press, 1998), ISBN 9780773430921
- Flashpoints (Lewiston, New York: Mellen Poetry Press, 2000), ISBN 0773427120
- Albert S. Cook reading from his work (sound recording, April 22, 1960), Library of Congress cat. no. LWO 3091
- Albert Cook reading (sound recording, April 26, 1978), Poetry Collection, University at Buffalo Libraries

=== Drama ===
- "Sophocles' Oedipus Rex translated into English verse," staged at Tributary Theatre, Boston, and Cleveland Playhouse, Cleveland. (See also "Translations" below.)
- Double Exposure (full-length play): Edlred Theatre, Cleveland, Ohio 1958
- Night Guard (one act play) broadcast by WBAI, New York and KPFA San Francisco 1962
- Big Blow (full-length play): Chamber Theatre, Buffalo, New York 1964
- Check (full-length play): Chamber Theatre, Buffalo, New York1966
- Pan Is Dead (full-length play): staged reading, Playwright's Platform, Boston March 1985
- The Death of Trotsky published in: Theatre and Drama 9:1, Fall 1970
- Recall] announced for: Richard Kostelanetz (ed.), American Radio Plays; produced at Brown University, 1987

=== Translations ===
- Homer, Odyssey: A Verse Translation (New York: W. W. Norton, 1967); republished as The Odyssey: A Norton Critical Edition (New York: W. W. Norton, 1972) ISBN 0393964051
- Sophocles, Oedipus Rex in: Ten Greek Plays (New York: Houghton Mifflin, 1957); republished in Reading for Pleasure (Prentice-Hall, 1960); also in Oedipus Rex: A Mirror for Greek Drama (San Francisco 1963); as Oedipus Rex (Prospect Heights, Illinois: Waveland Press, 1982); and in Greek Tragedy: An Anthology (Wayne State University Press, revised ed., 1993)
- (with Pamela Perkins) The Burden of Sufferance: Russian Women Poets (New York: Garland, 1993 ISBN 0824033256

=== Compilations ===
- (with Edwin Dolin) Anthology of Greek Tragedy (Indianapolis: Bobbs-Merrill Library of Literature, 1972) ISBN 0882142151
- Peter Baker, Sarah Webster Goodwin, and Gary Handwerk (eds.), The Scope of Words (New York: Peter Lang, 1991) – a miscellany of essays and tributes, with a poem dedicated to Cook by Robert Creeley ISBN 0820414174
- Peter Baker (ed.), Forces in Modern and Post-Modern Poetry (New York: Peter Lang, 2008) ISBN 0820451347
