= Fritts =

Fritts is an American surname, a spelling variation of Fritz, which is itself a nickname of Friedrich. Notable people with the surname include:

- Bradley Fritts (born 2000), American politician
- Charles Fritts (1850–1903), American inventor
- Donnie Fritts (1942–2019), American musician and songwriter
- George Fritts (1919–1987), American football player and coach
- Harry W. Fritts Jr. (1921–2011), American physician and medical school professor
- Monty Fritts (born 1963), American politician
- Paul Fritts, American pipe organ builder
- Robert E. Fritts (1934–2015), American diplomat
- Stan Fritts (born 1952), American football player
