= Reginald John Campbell =

British Congregationalist and Anglican preacher and theologian

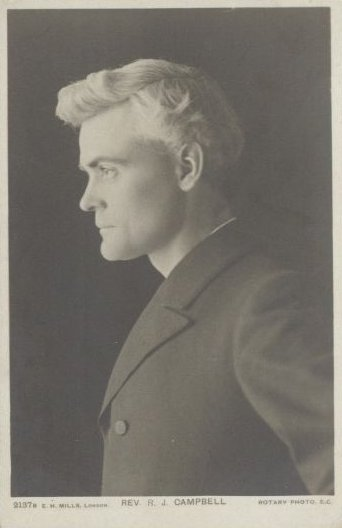
R J Campbell in 1903

Reginald John Campbell (29 August 1867 – 1 March 1956) was a British Congregationalist and Anglican divine who became a popular preacher while the minister at the City Temple and a leading exponent of 'The New Theology' movement of 1907. His last years were spent as a senior cleric in the Church of England.

== Early years ==
Born at Bermondsey in London, the second of four sons and one daughter of John Campbell (born 1841), a United Free Methodist minister of Scottish descent, and his wife, Mary Johnston, he was registered at birth as John Wesley Campbell, which name also appears on his first marriage certificate in 1889. A brother was the writer James Johnston Campbell. At a few months old Campbell went to live with his maternal grandparents, John Johnston and his wife, near Belfast in Northern Ireland because of his delicate health. Here, later, he was home tutored.

After the death of his grandfather in 1880, aged 13 he rejoined his parents in England, where he was educated at grammar schools in Bolton and Nottingham, where his father successively removed. After studying at University College, Nottingham, he taught in the high school at Ashton, Cheshire from 1888, where the Headmaster was the Rev. F. H. Mentha, MA. His influence over Campbell made him receptive to the Oxford Philosophy proclaimed by Dean Paget. This resulted in his confirmation in the Church of England and in his preparation for the priesthood. A boy at the school wrote of Campbell to his predecessor:

"We have got a curlywigged old fellow in your place, called Campbell, and I think he must be a B.A., or M.A., or something because he wears a hat and gown, and I don't know whether his hair is his own. He is going to try and teach us Chemistry soon, but he seems to know only what he gets out of the textbook..."

On 8 June 1889, he married Mary Elizabeth Campbell (née Slack) (1861–1924), a member of his father's congregation at the United Free Methodist Church in Nottingham. Their infant son, Charles Edgar Campbell, died in 1891. In 1892 Campbell went to Christ Church, Oxford, where he graduated in 1895 in Honours in the School of Modern History and Political Science. He matriculated at Oxford as Reginald John Campbell, the names by which he was then commonly known. He graduated MA in 1902. During his time at Christ Church Campbell preached in the villages around Oxford. He was a non-smoker and a teetotaller.

He had gone up to Oxford with the intention of becoming a clergyman in the Church of England, but in spite of the influence of Bishop Gore, then head of the Pusey House, and of Dean Paget (afterwards Bishop of Oxford), his Scottish and Irish Nonconformist blood was too strong, and at that time he abandoned the idea in order to take up work in the Congregational ministry, following in the footsteps of his grandfather, the Rev. James Campbell. He joined the Congregational Church which met in George Street, Oxford under the Rev A. R. Ezard.

== The City Temple ==
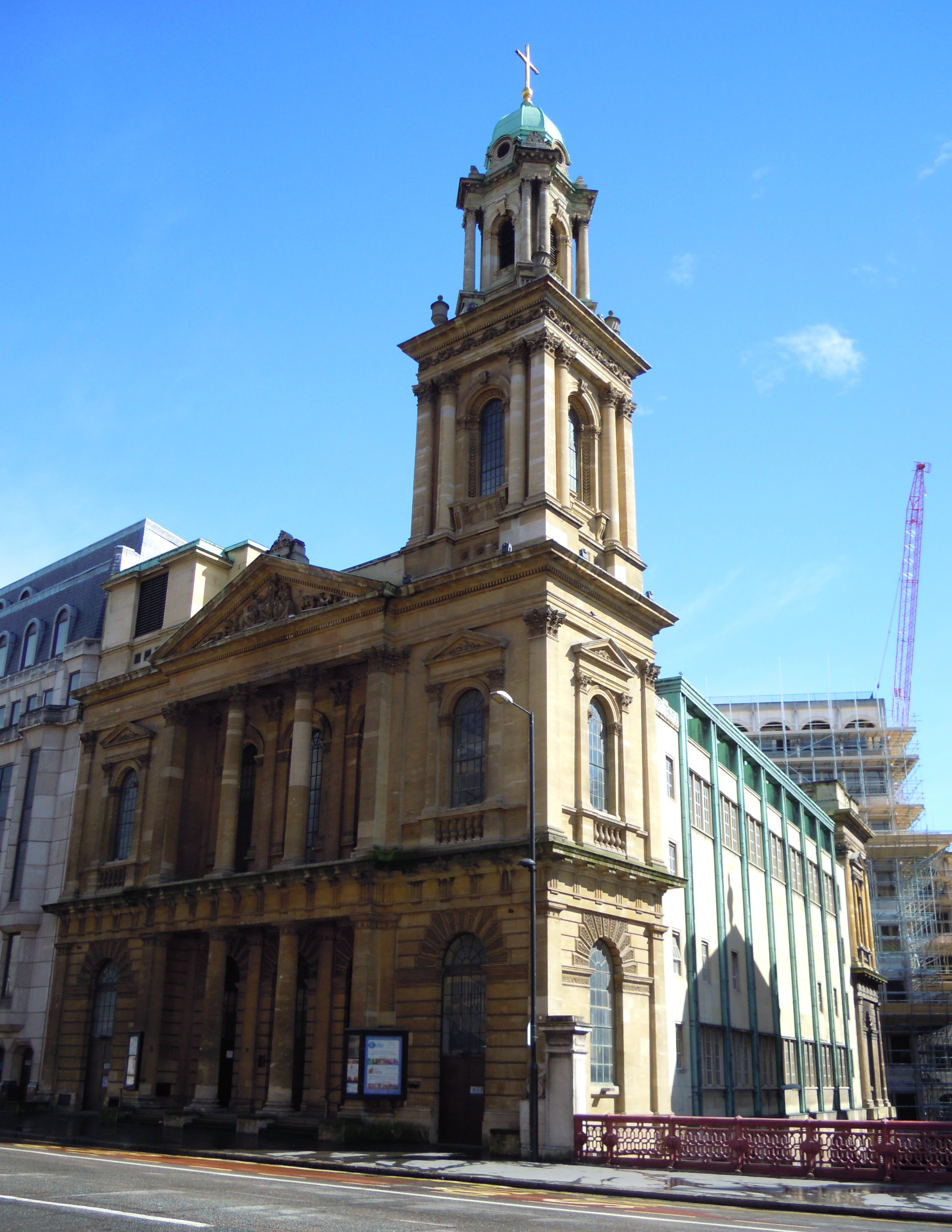
The City Temple in Holborn

On leaving Oxford he accepted a call to the small Congregational church in Union Street, Brighton, commencing his ministry there in the summer of 1895. Within a year Campbell filled the church, and to accommodate the crowds who came to hear him preach the Union Street church merged with another larger church in Queens' Square in Brighton. Marie Corelli always attended the Union Street services during Campbell's time there.

He quickly became famous at Brighton as a preacher, so much so that in the Summer of 1902 Joseph Parker, whose health was declining, invited Campbell to assist him by preaching at the City Temple's Thursday mid-day services. Following Parker's death in November 1902 Campbell was chosen as his successor and was inaugurated as minister of the City Temple—London's "cathedral of nonconformity"—on 21 May 1903. While his predecessor was theologically conservative, Campbell was emphatically not. A Socialist politically, his theology proved as radical as his politics.

Seven thousand people attended the services on his first Sunday. He was expected to preach twice on Sundays and at the popular Thursday lunchtime services. His sermons, which addressed both issues of the day and doctrinal questions, were instantly published and attracted much attention both in Britain and in the United States. Picture postcards of Campbell were soon on sale alongside those of actresses and other celebrities of the day, and the R. J. Campbell Birthday Book containing his ‘favourite poetical quotations, portrait and autograph’ could also be purchased. The publicity which attended his arrival in London rarely left him for the next dozen years. At the City Temple he notably enhanced his popularity as a preacher, and became one of the recognized leaders of Nonconformist opinion.

As his fame spread he was invited on a preaching tour of America and Canada. He left Southampton on 13 June 1903, arriving in New York on 20 June. He preached or spoke at venues in New York, Boston, and Chicago. At Ocean Grove he spoke to a crowd of 10,000. He also preached in Toronto and Montreal, visiting Niagara Falls on the way.

== Controversy ==
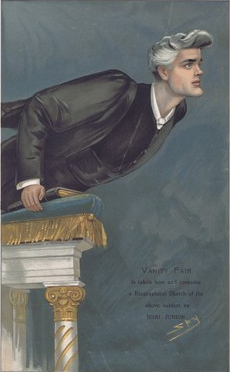
"Fearless but Intemperate" Campbell as caricatured by 'Spy' in Vanity Fair, November 1904

Campbell was criticised for an article published in the National Review in October 1904 in which he described British working men as " ... often lazy, unthrifty, and improvident, while they are sometimes immoral, foul-mouthed, and untruthful". Crowds of angry and threatening working men gathered outside the City Temple on the Sunday following where they waited for Campbell. In an attempt to explain his meaning he appeared at a meeting of the Paddington and Kensington Trades and Labour Councils on 21 October 1904 during which he disavowed any intention of making an indiscriminate attack on the workers.

Although he was severely heckled by his audience during the delivery of his speech, Campbell's courage in facing the unions and acknowledging the truth of the reports as to his previous comments was recognised and he was loudly cheered at the conclusion of his address.

In the November 1904 edition of The Young Man Campbell explained himself further in an article called 'The Truth about the Working Man Controversy':

"...Two-thirds of the national drinking bill is incurred by the working man. His keenest struggles are for shorter hours and better wages, but not that he may employ them for higher ends. He is often lazy and untruthful. Unlike the American worker, he has comparatively little aspiration or ambition...."

"Let it be understood that, as here stated, they (his statements) are not intended to apply to working men as a whole, but to large classes among them, which classes, it is to be feared, constitute a majority. I say it is to be feared they do. But 51 per cent constitutes a majority, and there are plenty of my correspondents who think the percentage of working men of whose habits my words are a fair description numbers considerably more than 51 per cent... The working man is moved and flattered bv politicians, platform agitators, and preachers. He is accustomed to rail at the clerical calling and sins of the churches. He will cheer loudly when parsons, plutocrats and the aristocracy are being vilified, but let no one presume to hint at any shortcomings in himself. Bear in mind I am still speaking of those whose habits are described in my article, and not of the quiet, respectable, hard-working sons of toil, for whom the public house and the betting corners have no attraction"

Questions also soon began to be raised about the way that Campbell introduced Biblical criticism into his preaching, questioning the traditional ascription of books, and the origins of the text. As his sermons were published, this brought them to the notice of readers throughout the nation, and beyond. The theology held by Campbell and a number of his friends came to be known as 'The New Theology'. Unwisely, Campbell decided to answer his critics by issuing a volume entitled simply The New Theology, a restatement of Christian beliefs to harmonize with modern critical views and beliefs. Looking back on it later, he felt that he had gone too far. "It was much too hastily written, was crude and uncompromising in statement, polemical in spirit, and gave a totally wrong impression of the sermons delivered week by week in the City Temple Pulpit".

== Support for the Independent Labour Party and further controversy ==
In the ensuing decade, Campbell continued to read and reflect on the literature regarding the historical Jesus. His study persuaded him that the historical Jesus was nothing like the Jesus of liberal Protestantism but was rather much more nearly the way he is portrayed in Catholic tradition. In July 1907 he declared his conviction that Socialism was the practical form of Christianity; subsequently, he was invited to stand as a Labour Party candidate for Cardiff in the forthcoming elections. He was elected to the executive of the Fabian Society in 1908, but was apparently too busy to ever attend a single committee meeting. He shared a platform with Keir Hardie on several occasions, most notably at a great meeting in Liverpool in March 1907.

His association with the Independent Labour Party, precursor of the Labour Party was particularly significant in South Wales, where his appearance at a meeting at Ystalyfera was influential in the political development of the future Labour politician James Griffiths. There were also groups who regarded themselves as 'Campbellites' in many South Wales communities and this caused divisions in some nonconformist chapels, for example at Bethel, Gadlys near Aberdare.

In February 1911 he again caused a stir when he announced at a meeting of the Theosophical Society in London that he believed in reincarnation, and that he believed that when Jesus returned for the Second Coming he would be reincarnated.

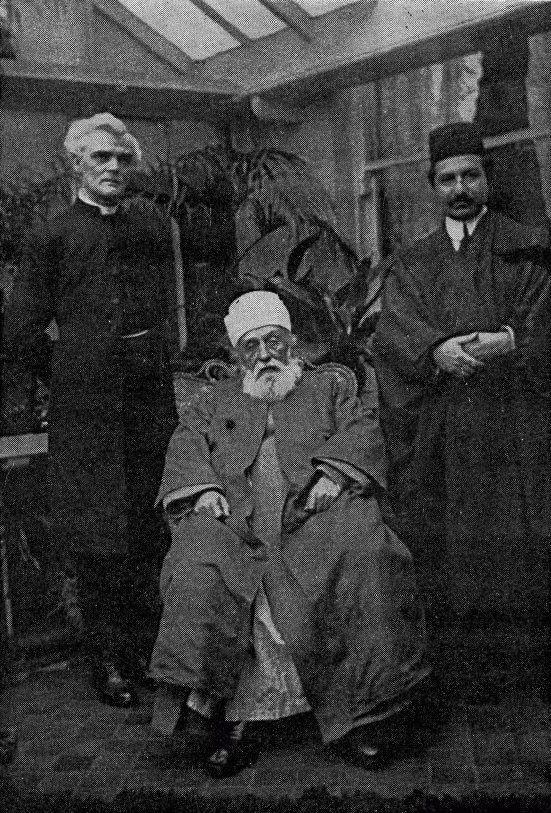
Campbell with ʻAbdu'l-Bahá in 1911

On 5 September 1911 Campbell met `Abdu'l-Bahá, the eldest son and successor of Bahá'u'lláh, the founder of the Baháʼí Faith, and invited him to give a public address in the City Temple a few days later. In October 1911, accompanied by his wife and daughter, Hilda May (1891–1935), he embarked on a three-month preaching tour of the United States.

== Return to Anglicanism ==
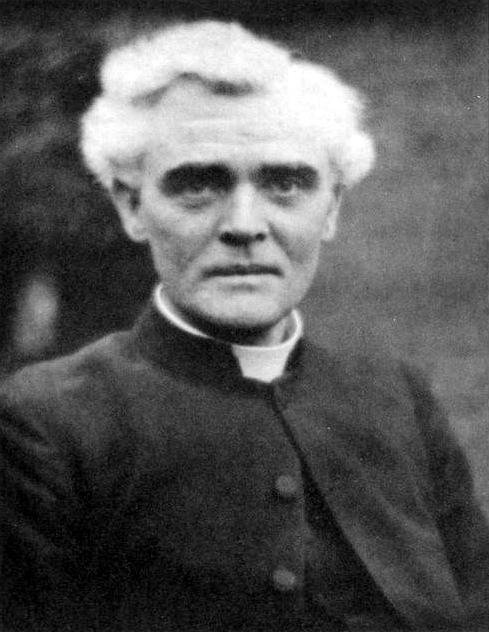
R.J. Campbell in 1914

In the summer of 1915, after a tour of the trenches during World War I, Campbell underwent a deep personal crisis, seeing a need for greater Christian unity, and for himself a return to the Church of England. This crisis, which led him to turn from being a liberal Protestant to being a liberal Catholic, came largely from his earlier researches into Biblical criticism and the historical Jesus, his conclusions leading him to the opinion that the Jesus of liberal Protestantism did not exist, and that the historical Jesus was much closer to that taught in Catholic doctrine. He wrote:

"It was the Christ of the Catholic Church that stood forth from the newer criticism of the gospel sources, not the Christ of liberal Protestantism. This was thrust forcibly upon my attention. The alternatives were obvious : Either Jesus was what the Catholic Church said He was or He did not exist; either He was the Man from heaven, a complete break with the natural order of things, the representative of a transcendental order, supernatural, super-rational super-everything, or He was nothing. This was scarcely the Christ of Protestantism at all, whether liberal or conservative."

He considered rewriting his book, The New Theology, keeping to the same sequence of subjects, but correcting all the points in which it was at variance with Catholic doctrine. Eventually, he felt that the book's title made such a move impossible, so instead, in March 1915, he decided to withdraw the book and purchased the publishing rights to prevent its possible re-issue.

In October 1915 Campbell preached his last sermon at the City Temple and resigned from the Congregational church; a few days later he was received back into the Church of England by Bishop Gore at Cuddesdon.

In October 1916 he was ordained as an Anglican priest, and became attached to the staff of St Philip's Cathedral, Birmingham before appointment as Vicar of Christ Church, Westminster from 1917 to 1921, and then at Holy Trinity in Brighton from 1924 to 1930. On rejoining the Church of England, and at the request of some old Congregational friends, with whom he remained on good terms, he wrote an account of the development of his thought in A Spiritual Pilgrimage (1916). In 1919 he was granted the honorary degree of Doctor of Divinity from the University of Oxford. His biography of David Livingstone was published in 1929.

== Later years ==
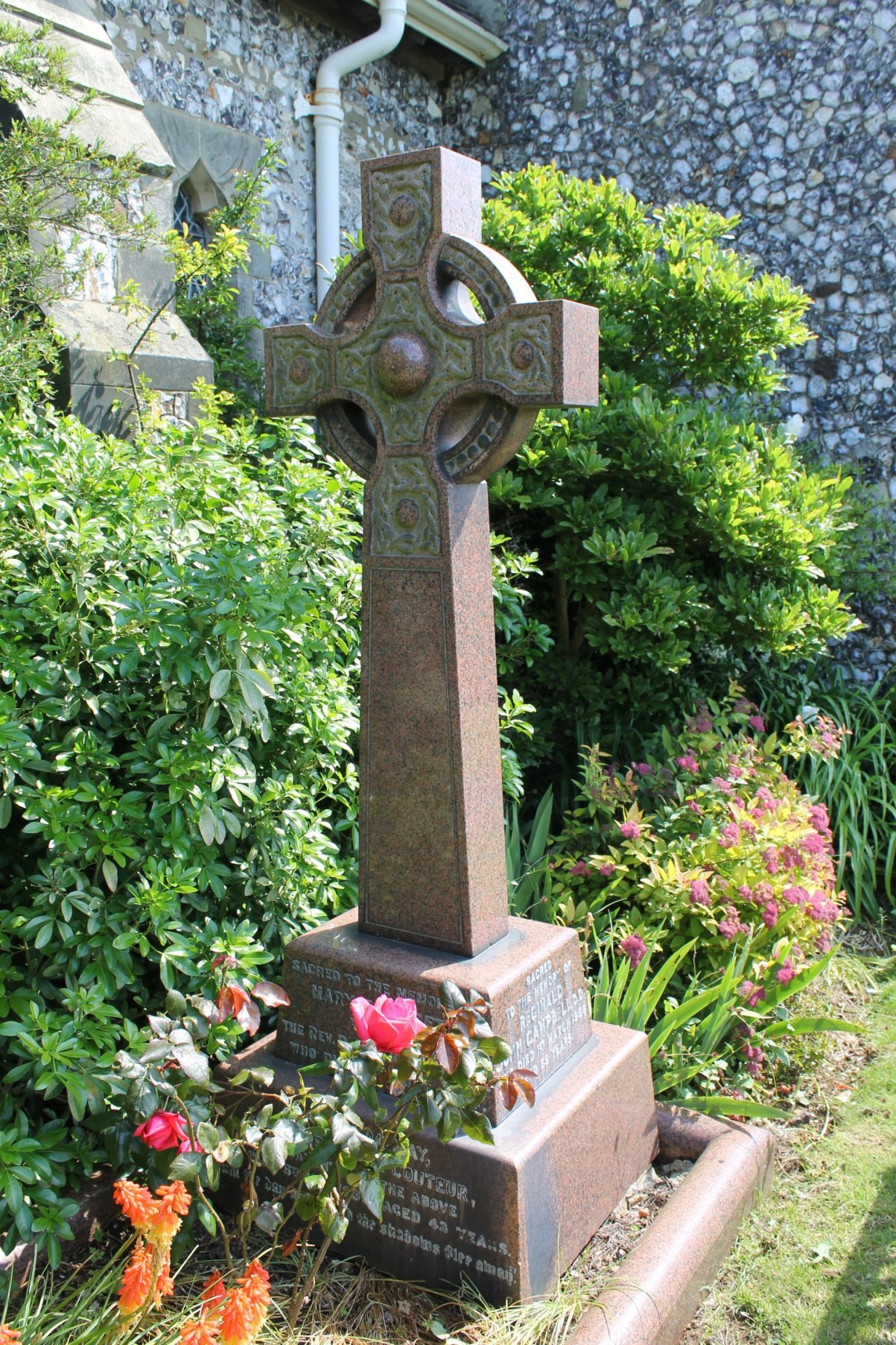
The grave of R J Campbell in St Peter's Church at West Blatchington

He became Residentiary Canon and Chancellor of Chichester Cathedral in 1930, and was Chaplain and theological lecturer of Bishop Otter College in Chichester from 1933 to 1936. Following the death of his first wife in 1927, aged 60 he married Ethel Gertrude Smith (1885–1943), his adopted daughter who was also his secretary. He resigned as Chancellor of Chichester Cathedral in 1946 aged 80, and was appointed Canon Emeritus.

Largely forgotten at the time of his death, in his latter decades he had deliberately kept out of the limelight, seeking to avoid the fame that had pursued him during his early career, and which, perhaps, he had sought, and to live quietly and in relative obscurity.

R.J. Campbell died in 1956 at his home, "Heatherdene", in Fairwarp in East Sussex aged 89. The funeral service was led by George Bell, the Bishop of Chichester. He was buried with his first wife and daughter in a grave which also contained the ashes of his second wife in the churchyard of St Peter's Church at West Blatchington, near Hove in East Sussex.

== Gallery ==
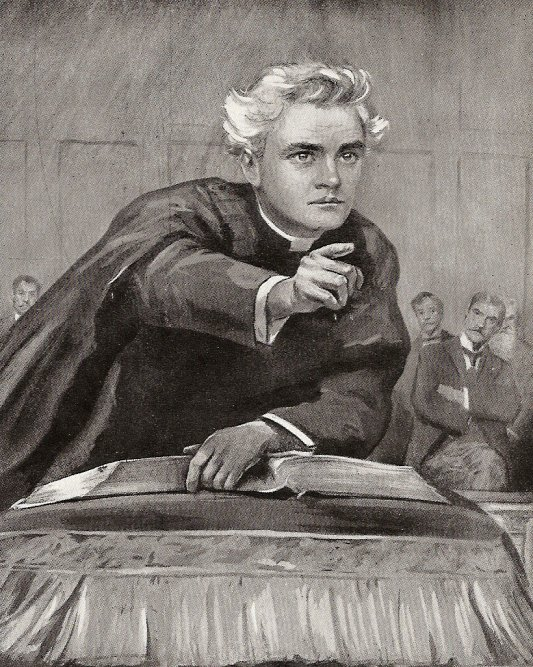
Campbell preaching before 1903

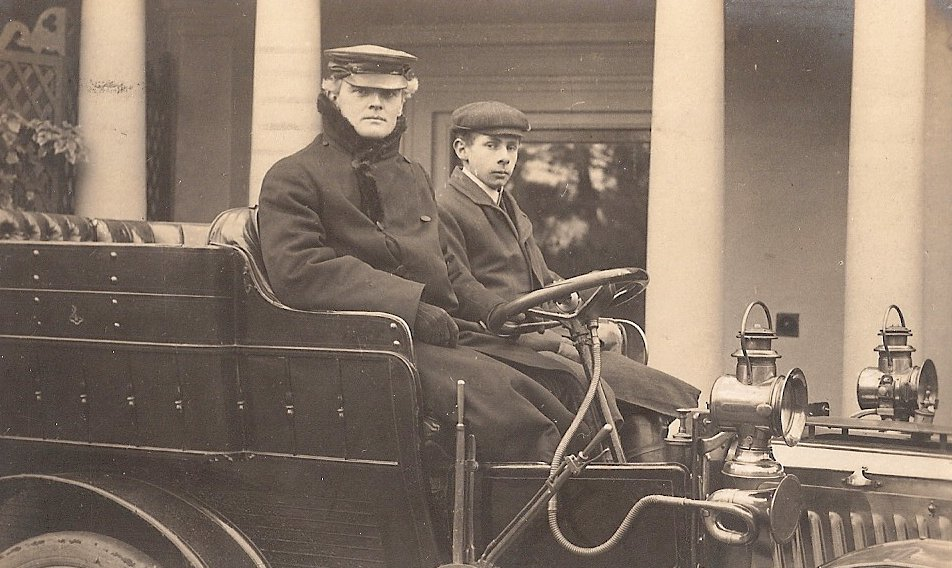
Campbell at the wheel of his car, c. 1904

Campbell with his daughter, c. 1904

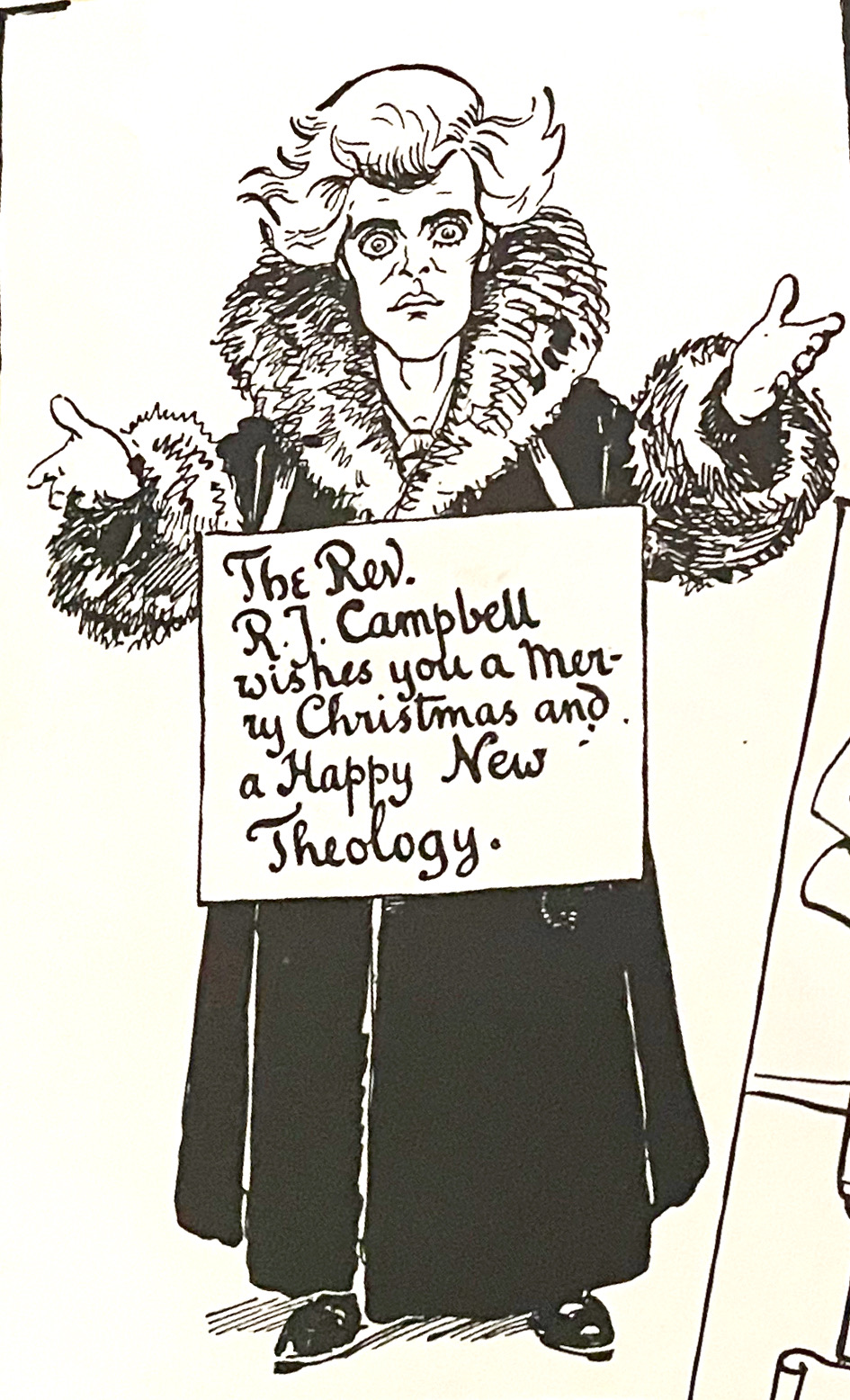
Punch cartoon Christmas card as if from the preacher R J Campbell (published 1908)

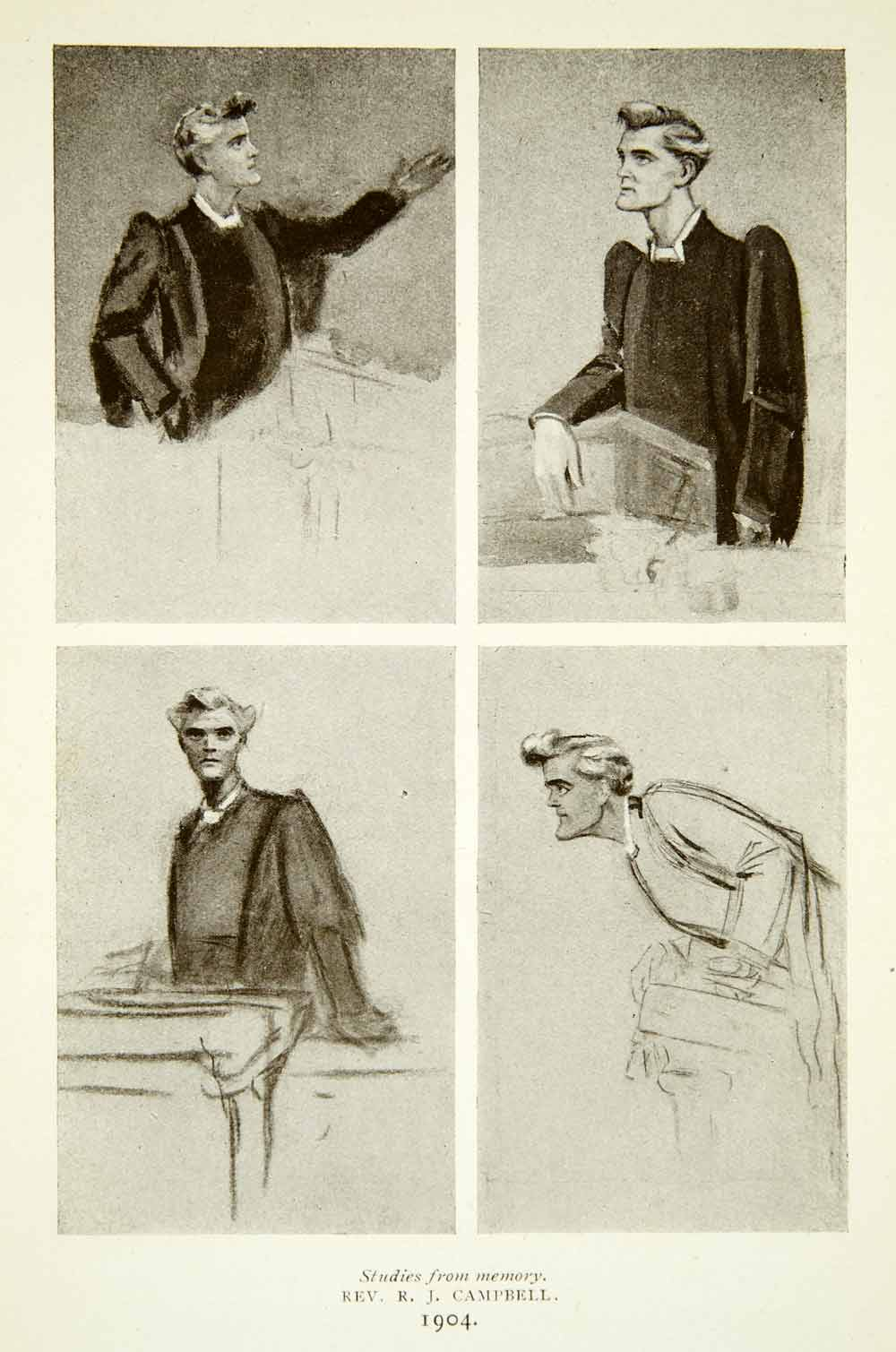
Leslie Ward's sketches for the 1904 Vanity Fair caricature (published 1915)

== Selected publications ==
- The Restored Innocence Hodder & Stoughton, London (1898)
- A Faith for To-day: Suggestions Towards a System of Christian Belief J. Clarke & Co., London (1900)
- City Temple Sermons Hodder & Stoughton (1903)
- The Keys of the Kingdom, and Other Sermons A. H. Stockwell: London (1903)
- Sermons to Young Men S. C. Brown, Langham & Co., London (1904)
- The Song of Ages, and Other Sermons H. Marshall & Son, London (1905)
- Christianity and the Social Order Chapman & Hall (1907)
- The New Theology Chapman & Hall, London (1907)
- New Theology Sermons Williams & Norgate, London (1907)
- Thursday Mornings at the City Temple T. Fisher Unwin: London, Leipsic (1908)
- Women's Suffrage and the Social Evil: Speech delivered at the Queen's Hall, etc Women's Freedom League, London (1909)
- With our Troops in France Chapman & Hall, London (1916)
- The War and the Soul Chapman & Hall, London (1916)
- A Spiritual Pilgrimage Williams & Norgate (1916)
- The Life of Christ Cassell & Co., London (1921)
- A Notable Centenary- Holy Trinity, Brighton 1826–1926, The Southern Publishing Co. Ltd, Brighton (1926)
- Thomas Arnold Macmillan & Co., London (1927)
- Livingstone Ernest Benn, London (1929)
- The Story of Christmas Collins: London & Glasgow (1935)
- The Peace of God Nisbet & Co., London (1936)
- The Life of the World to Come Longmans, Green & Co., London (1948)
