= Joseph Parker (theologian) =

English Congregational minister

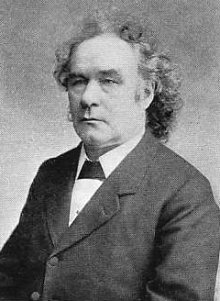
Joseph Parker.

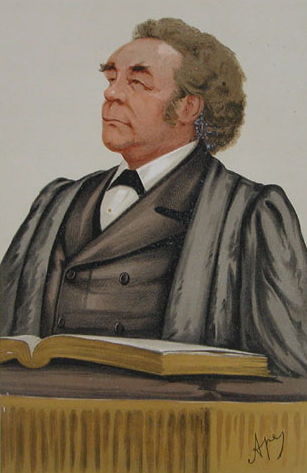
Joseph Parker, by Carlo Pellegrini, 1884.

Joseph Parker (9 April 1830 – 28 November 1902) was an English Congregational minister.

== Life ==
Born in Hexham, Northumberland, Parker was the son of Teasdale Parker, a stonemason, and Elizabeth (née Dodd). He managed to pick up a fair education, which afterwards he constantly supplemented. In the revolutionary years from 1845 to 1850 young Parker as a local preacher and temperance orator gained a reputation for vigorous utterance. He was influenced by Thomas Cooper, the Chartist, and Edward Miall, the Liberationist, and was much associated with Joseph Cowen, afterwards MP for Newcastle upon Tyne.

At the time, he was wooing a local girl – Ann Nesbitt, daughter of William Nesbitt, a farmer of Horsley-on-Tyne. He referred to her as "Annie, the soul I loved, the girl that saved me, and made me a man". Horsley was about ten miles from Hexham, and he became acquainted with the Nesbitts through his preaching there, and Mr Nesbitt, a trustee and deacon of Horsley Congregational Church was especially interested in the young preacher, who, on Sunday nights, brought them the news of the town and slept in a "snug little chamber" in the old farmhouse.

Ann and Joseph were married on 15 November 1851 in Horsley Congregational Church, though Joseph was only twenty-one years old, and they had twelve years' happy married life – consisting of six months in Horsley, a year or two in London, five years in Banbury, and five in Manchester – until Ann died in 1863. However, when Horsley Congregational Church was rebuilt, Dr. Parker presented a beautiful stained glass window, bearing the following inscription: "In ever loving memory of Ann Nesbitt, for twelve years the devoted wife of Joseph Parker, Minister of the City Temple, London, this window is reverently and gratefully erected by the man whose life she did so much to mould". The pulpit of grained oak was given at the same time and was inscribed: "In grateful memory of William Nesbitt of Horsley Hills, to whom the Church herein assembling is deeply indebted for long-continued and invaluable service, this pulpit is affectionately erected by his son-in-law Joseph Parker." Both the stained glass window and the pulpit can still be viewed at Horsley Congregational Church. The site is now managed by The Hearth Centre (Horsley) Ltd locally known as The Hearth – see www.thehearth.co.uk . Regular church services are still held in the church.

In the spring of 1852 he wrote to Dr John Campbell, minister of Whitefield Tabernacle, Moorfields, London, for advice as to entering the Congregational ministry, and after a short probation he became Campbell's assistant. He also attended lectures in logic and philosophy at University College London. From 1853 to 1858 he was pastor at Banbury. His next charge was at Cavendish Street, Manchester, where he rapidly made himself felt as a power in English Nonconformity. While here he published a volume of lectures entitled Church Questions, and, anonymously, Ecce Deus (1868), a work provoked by Seeley's Ecce Homo. The University of Chicago conferred on him the degree of D.D.

In 1869, he returned to London as minister of the Poultry church, founded by Thomas Goodwin. Almost at once he began the scheme which resulted in the erection of the great City Temple in Holborn Viaduct. It cost £70,000, and was opened on 19 May 1874. From this centre his influence spread far and wide. His stimulating and original sermons, delivered with a ready command of vigorous English, made him one of the best known personalities of his time. Dr. Parker exchanged a number of friendly letters with Spurgeon, and was invited to speak on Spurgeon's fiftieth birthday. One of Spurgeon's biographers, A. Cunningham Burley, makes an extended comparison between Spurgeon and Dr. Parker; Burley wrote, "The wonderful thing is that these two men [Spurgeon and Parker], so strangely compounded, drew closer together as time went on. They learned (surely in the school of Christ) to praise each other's genius and to rejoice in each other's success."

Dr Parker was twice chairman of the London Congregational Board and twice of the Congregational Union of England and Wales. In 1887 he visited the United States, where he delivered a eulogy on Henry Ward Beecher, with whom he had been on very intimate terms. On 22 December 1864, Parker married Emma Jane, daughter of Andrew Common JP, banker, of Sunderland. Her death, on 26 January 1899, was a blow from which he never fully recovered. She was buried at the West Hampstead Cemetery.

Parker was commemorated by the Parker Memorial Congregational Church, which opened in November 1907 in Crowborough, East Sussex. The red-brick church, which cost £2,000, is now called the United Church and is used by the town's United Reformed and Methodist communities.

On his death (in London) he was succeeded as minister of the City Temple by Reginald John Campbell.

== Preaching ==
Parker's preaching differed widely from his contemporaries like Spurgeon and Alexander Maclaren. He did not follow outlines or list his points, but spoke extemporaneously, inspired by his view of the spirit and attitude behind his Scripture text. He expressed himself frankly, with conviction and passion. His transcriber commented that he was at his best when he strayed furthest from his loose outlines.

He did not often delve into detailed textual or critical debates. His preaching was neither systematic theology nor expository commentary, but sound more like his personal meditations. Writers of the time describe his delivery as energetic, theatrical and impressive, attracting at various times famous people and politicians such as William Gladstone.

== Influence ==
Joseph Parker's chief legacy was not his theology but his gift for oratory. Charles Spurgeon praised his originality, writing, "Dr. Parker's track is his own and the jewels he lets fall in his progress are from his own casket." Alexander Whyte commented on Joseph Parker: "He is by far the ablest man now standing in the English-speaking pulpit. He stands in the pulpit of Thomas Goodwin, the Atlas of Independency. And Dr. Parker is a true and worthy successor to this great Apostolic Puritan." Among his biographers, Margaret Bywater called him "the most outstanding preacher of his time", and Angus Watson wrote that "no one had ever spoken like him."

Another writer and pastor, Ian Maclaren, offered the following tribute: "Dr. Parker occupies a lonely place among the preachers of our day. His position among preachers is the same as that of a poet among ordinary men of letters."

== Writings ==
Parker was pre-eminently a preacher, and his published works are chiefly sermons and expositions. Among them are:

- Hidden Springs (1864)
- Ecce Deus: Essays on the Life and Doctrine of Jesus Christ (1868)
- City Temple Sermons (1869–1870)
- Ecce Homo: The Paraclete (1874)
- The Inner Life of Christ (1881)
- Apostolic Life (1884)
- The People's Bible, in 25 vol. (1885–1895) later republished as Preaching Through the Bible
- People's Family Prayer Book (1898)
- Paterson's Parish (1898)
- Christian Profiles in a Pagan Mirror (1898)
- Studies in Texts, in 6 vol. (1898-1900)

=== Autobiographical works ===
- Springdale Abbey, Extracts from the Letters and Diaries of an English Preacher (1869)
- Tyne Chylde: My Life and Ministry, Partly in the Daylight of Fact, Partly in the Limelight of Fancy (1883; new ed., 1889)
- A Preacher's Life (1899)
