= Paul D. Hurd Jr. =

American entomologist (1921–1982)

Paul David Hurd Jr. (April 2, 1921 – March 12, 1982) was an American entomologist who specialized the Hymenoptera of western North America. He was an authority on the taxonomy and biology of bees.

He was educated at the University of California, Berkeley, receiving the B.S. degree in 1947, the M.S. degree in 1948, and the Ph.D. degree in 1950. His professional career began in 1950 when he was appointed Senior Museum Entomologist at his alma mater. Hurd was eventually given teaching as well as research responsibilities, and by 1965 he had attained the rank of Professor of Entomology and Entomologist in the California Agricultural Experiment Station. During 1967-1968, he took a leave of absence from the University to join the National Science Foundation as Associate Program Director in the Division of Biological and Medical Sciences. In 1970, Hurd left Berkeley to accept appointment as Curator in the Department of Entomology, National Museum of Natural History (NMNH). From 1971 to 1976, he served as Chairman of the Department and in 1980 was appointed Senior Scientist. Hurd's research interests were broad and he published on several of the families of the insect order Hymenoptera. However, most of his research was devoted to the bees of the superfamily Apoidea. He published over twenty papers and books on the carpenter bees (xylocopinae) and conducted extensive studies on the bee pollinators of squashes, gourds, and the creosote bush. Hurd's research at the NMNH was highlighted by his work as co-editor and an author of the revised Catalog of Hymenoptera in America North of Mexico which was published in 1979. He conducted field work in the western and southwestern United States, Mexico, South America, Central America, and Alaska. Hurd was a member of several professional organizations, and he served on the Governing Board of the Entomological Society of America and as editor of the Pan-Pacific Entomologist, journal of the Pacific Coast Entomological Society.

Hurd was most known for his work on carpenter bees, and cucurbit pollinators, but also published on velvet ants, spider wasps, Anthophoridae, leaf-cutter and mason bees, and sweat bees. Hurd was a veteran of World War II, a Guggenheim Fellow in 1959, and a fellow of the American Association for the Advancement of Science.
