= City Temple, London =

Coordinates: 51°31′1.62″N 0°6′21.92″W

City Temple Holborn
- The City Temple in the City of London
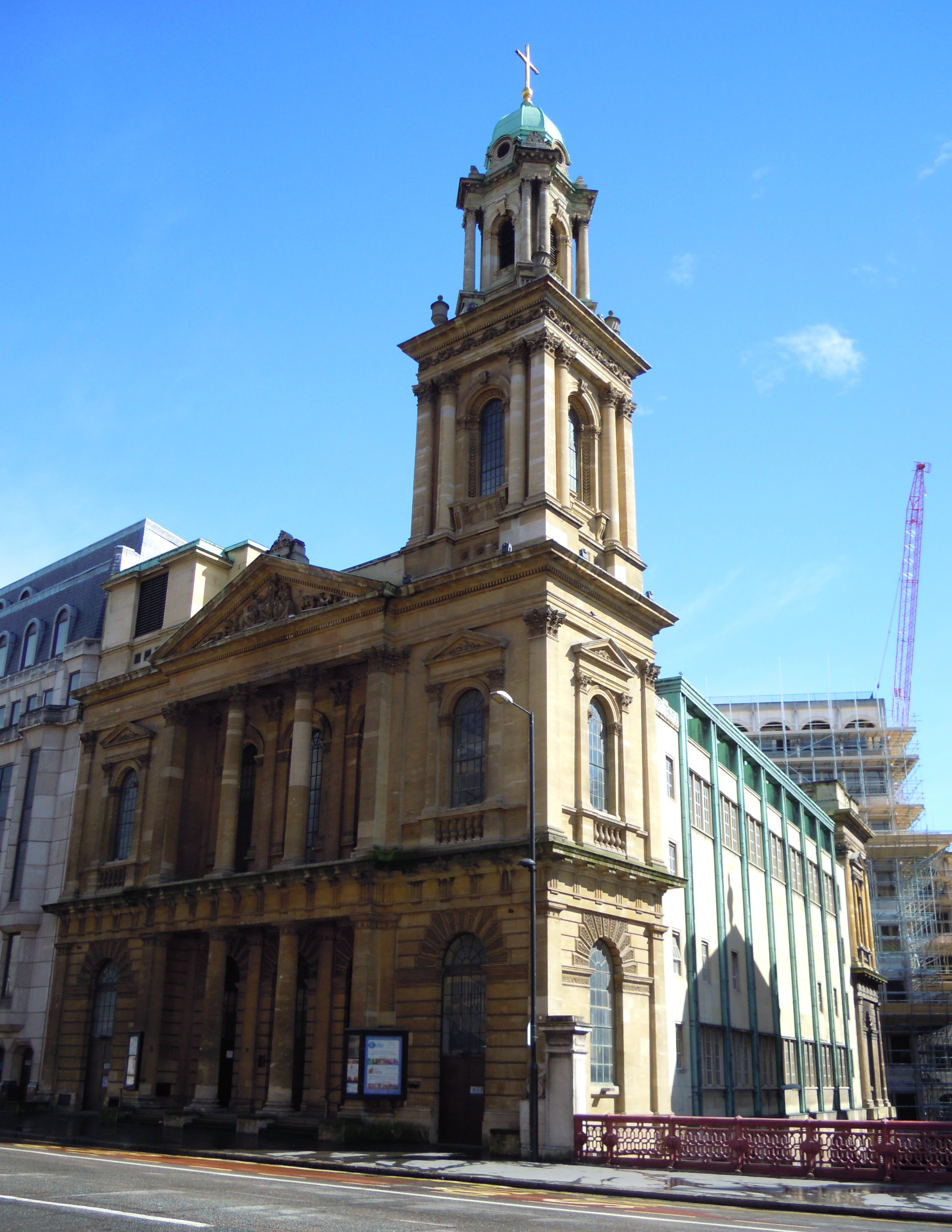
- Photo of the City Temple

- Location within City of London
- OS grid reference: TQ 31509 81509
- Location: Holborn Viaduct, City of London
- Country: England
- Language: English
- Denomination: United Reformed Church
- Website: city-temple.com

History
- Founded: c. 1640, or as early as the 1560s, on a different site
- Founder: Thomas Goodwin

Architecture
- Functional status: Active
- Architect(s): Lockwood and Mason
- Style: Gothic Revival
- Years built: 1873–1874. Reconstructed 1958

The City Temple is a Nonconformist church on Holborn Viaduct in London. The current minister is Rodney Woods. The church is part of the Thames North Synod of the United Reformed Church and is a member of the Evangelical Alliance.

The City Temple is most famous as the preaching place of the 20th century liberal theologian Leslie Weatherhead. Other notable preachers have included R. J. Campbell, Joseph Fort Newton, Thomas Goodwin and Joseph Parker.

The first church building on the present site was built in 1874. The congregation was founded much earlier; the traditional date is 1640 but some evidence suggests it was founded as early as the 1560s by Puritans. Destroyed by bombing during the Second World War, it was rebuilt and reopened in 1958.

== Early history ==
The City Temple is widely believed to have been founded by Thomas Goodwin. The exact date of its foundation is unknown, but it is believed to have been around 1640. It is the oldest Nonconformist congregation in the City of London. Its first meeting-house was located in Anchor Lane. The second minister of the Church was Thomas Harrison, who succeeded Goodwin in 1650, at which time the Church moved to a meeting-house in Lime Street. Harrison's ministry only lasted until 1655. A successor was not appointed until 1658, when Thomas Mallory was called to pastor the Church. Mallory led the Church during the difficult period that followed the Restoration of the Monarchy in 1660. The Church moved several times but after a number of moves it found a more permanent home in the Poultry, Cheapside in 1819.

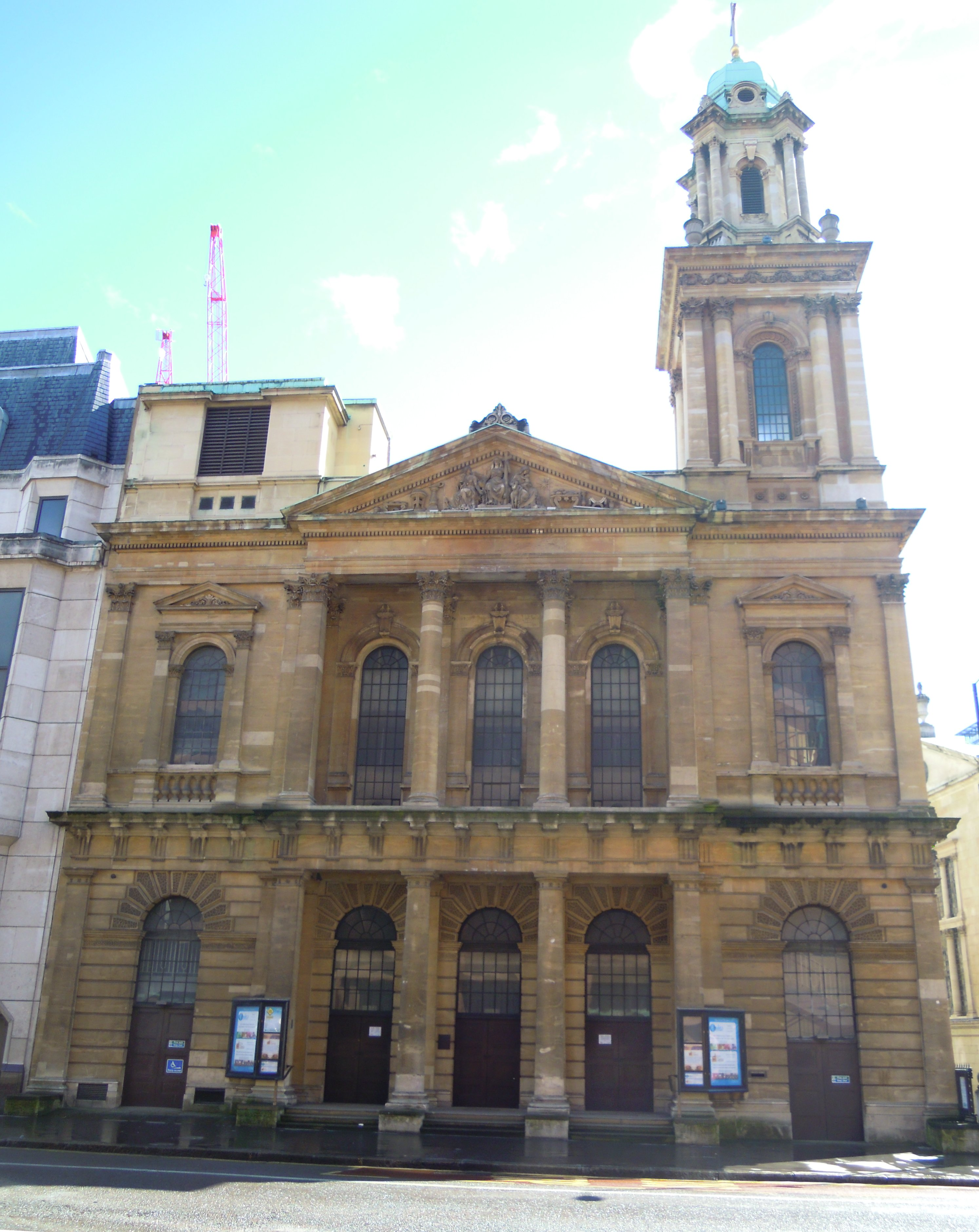
Holborn Viaduct frontage

Following the resignation of James Spence from the pastorate in 1867, the office-bearers of the Poultry Chapel approached Joseph Parker, then pastor at Cavendish Street Chapel, Manchester, with a view to calling him to the pastorate. The first call, in March 1868, he declined but in June 1869 he accepted. At the same time the Church was looking to relocate from its site in Poultry. The site was sold for 50,000GBP. The Church was then faced with the question of a new site. Parker insisted that the new site would have to be within the City of London, and ultimately the present site on Holborn Viaduct was secured. The Poultry Chapel was closed on 16 June 1872, and until the new church was ready, the congregation met in the great hall of Cannon Street Hotel in the morning, in Exeter Hall in the evening, and in the Presbyterian Church, London Wall, for mid-day services on Thursdays.

The Memorial Stone of the new building, to be called the City Temple, was laid by Thomas Binney on 19 May 1873. The Corporation of the City of London presented a spectacular marble pulpit to the Church. The building was dedicated on 19 May 1874. The building, from its location and size, began to assume the character of a Nonconformist cathedral, and became the most important Congregational pulpit in Britain. Much of this was due to Joseph Parker.

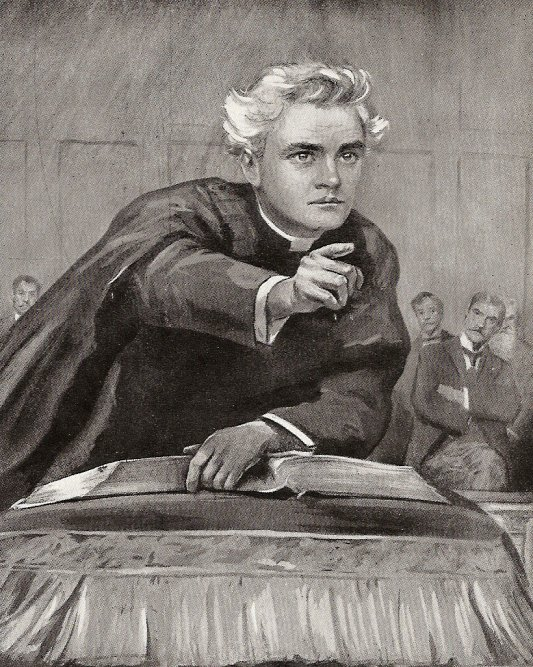
R. J. Campbell preaching in the City Temple in about 1903

As age began to tell on Parker, Reginald John Campbell, a Congregational minister in Brighton, was called in 1902 to act as his assistant. Shortly after his agreeing to this arrangement, Parker died suddenly. Parker had made it clear that it was his wish for Campbell to be his successor, and so Campbell was called.

While Parker was theologically conservative, publishing an anonymous reply to John Robert Seeley's Ecce Homo under the truculent title Ecce Deus, Campbell was emphatically not. A socialist politically, his theology proved as radical as his politics. Campbell's pastorate began in May 1903 and ended in October 1915. Questions began to be raised about the way that Campbell introduced Biblical criticism into his preaching, questioning the traditional ascription of books, and the origins of the text. As his sermons were published, this brought them to the notice of readers throughout the nation, and beyond.

The theology held by Campbell and a number of his friends came to be known as 'The New Theology'. Campbell decided to answer his critics by issuing a volume entitled simply The New Theology, which laid out his position. Looking back on it, he felt that he had gone too far. "It was much too hastily written, was crude and uncompromising in statement, polemical in spirit, and gave a totally wrong impression of the sermons delivered week by week in the City Temple Pulpit". Campbell himself came to a crisis of faith when several New Theologians began to question the doctrine of the deity, and even the historicity, of Christ.

In October 1915 Campbell preached his last sermon at the City Temple and resigned from the Congregational church; a few days later he was received into the Church of England by Bishop Gore and in October 1916 he was ordained as an Anglican priest. On joining the Church of England, and at the request of some old Congregational friends, with whom he remained on good terms, he wrote an account of the development of his thought in A Spiritual Pilgrimage (1916).

== Later years ==
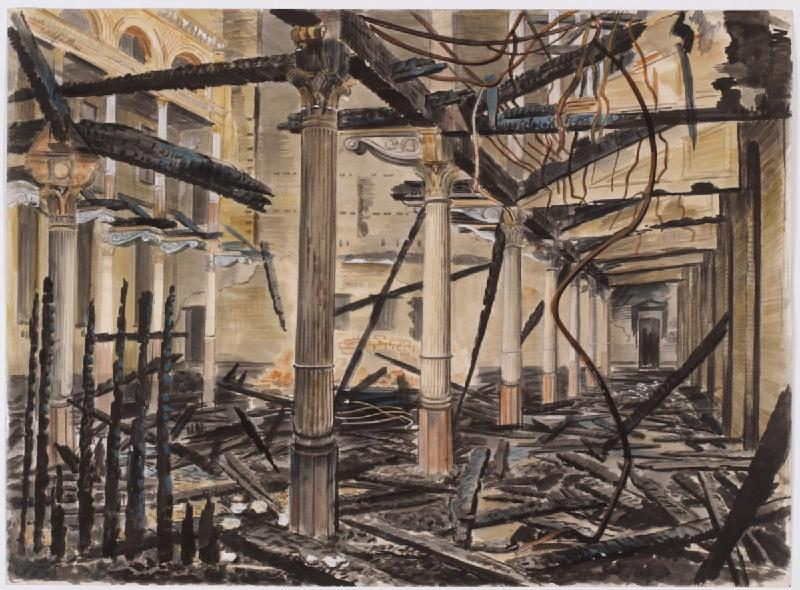
The interior of the City Temple destroyed in The Blitz – watercolour by Vivian Pitchforth (1941)

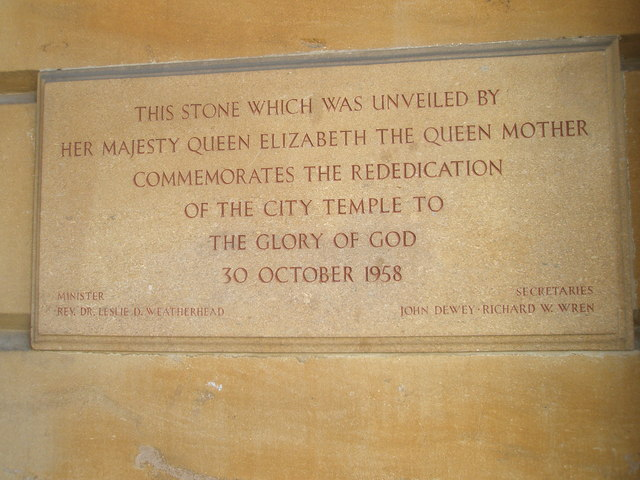
Plaque outside The City Temple, commemorating the rededication in 1958

Campbell's successor was theologically almost as radical as he had been. Though Joseph Fort Newton had been educated at Louisville's Southern Baptist Seminary, he was a theological liberal. Newton had been asked to the City Temple at first as a stop-gap after Campbell's resignation. What was controversial about Newton was not his theology, or even the fact that he was of a Baptist background but the fact that he was an American. As he remarked, it seemed that the view of many was that "It was perfectly right for an English preacher to go to an American Church, but absurd for an American preacher to go to an English Church". While the congregation decided to call Newton, the deacons opposed him, an action that finally led to the deacons being abolished and Newton going to London.

Newton found the burden of the City Temple too much for one man, and he asked for an assistant. Surprisingly the assistant finally called was a woman, Miss A. Maude Royden. She was an Anglican, but was prohibited from preaching by the Church of England. In the free atmosphere on the City Temple, however, she was welcomed by the Church, if not by the press.

Newton ministered at the City Temple through the First World War, returning to America in 1919. He was succeeded by F. W. Norwood, an Australian Baptist.

When Norwood left the City Temple in 1935, there was some uncertainty over where the next pastor should come from. Some argued that, since the Congregational Church had not had a Congregationalist pastor since 1915, when Campbell left, they should call a minister from within their own denomination. In the event, the man called was a Methodist minister, then stationed in Leeds, Leslie Weatherhead. He served there from 1936 until his retirement in 1960.

During The Blitz, the City Temple was "gutted by fire from incendiary bombs dropped from enemy aeroplanes". Weatherhead was able to continue his ministry thanks to the nearby Anglican St Sepulchre-without-Newgate church. After the war, Weatherhead raised the funds to rebuild the City Temple, largely from John D. Rockefeller Jr. The rebuilt City Temple was opened in the presence of Queen Elizabeth The Queen Mother in 1958. Weatherhead retired in 1960.

The City Temple has been listed Grade II on the National Heritage List for England since November 1977.

== Bibliography ==
- William Adamson: The Life of the Rev. Joseph Parker, D.D. (London, Cassell and Co., 1902)
- R. J. Campbell, A Spiritual Pilgrimage (London, Williams and Norgate, 1917)
- Campbell, The New Theology (London, Chapman and Hall, 1907)
- Joseph Fort Newton: River of Years (Philadelphia and New York, J.B. Lippincott, 1946)
- Joseph Parker: A Preacher's Life (London, Hodder and Stoughton, 1903)
- John Travell: Doctor of Souls (Cambridge, Lutterworth, 1999)
