= Mitzy Canessa =

Chilean physiologist (1930–1997)

- Born: 15 July 1930; Antofagasta, Chile
- Died: 1 February 1997 (aged 66)
- Occupation: Physiologist
- Awards: Guggenheim Fellowship (1959, 1961)

Academic background
- Education: University of Chile

Academic work
- Institutions: University of Chile; Harvard Medical School; Massachusetts General Hospital

Mitzy Canessa Ossandón (15 July 1930 – 1 February 1997) was a Chilean renal physiologist. She worked as a professor at the University of Chile and, as an exile from the Pinochet dictatorship, worked at Harvard Medical School in the United States. She was a two-time Guggenheim Fellow.

== Biography ==
Canessa was born on 15 July 1930 in Antofagasta, a port city in northern Chile. She studied at the University of Chile, where she obtained her degree in pharmaceutical chemistry in 1952. In 1959, she was awarded a Guggenheim Fellowship to study renal physiology. She was awarded a second one in 1961. She was a postdoctoral researcher at the Albert Einstein College of Medicine.

Canessa remained at the University of Chile as a professor; originally working at the School of Pharmacy as an assistant professor, she later moved to their Faculty of Medicine. She became a full professor at the University of Chile's Faculty of Sciences since its inception in the 1960s, something Cecilia Hidalgo Tapia considered her instrumental in. She also did research at the Cell Physiology Laboratory in Montemar, as well as at the Hospital del Salvador's renal function laboratory. She served as director of the University of Chile Graduate School in 1974.

In 1974, Canessa began working at Harvard Medical School, as one of several scientists exiled from the country due to the 1973 Chilean coup d'état. During her time at Harvard, she did research on hypertension. She was also part of Massachusetts General Hospital's Laboratory of Renal Biophysics, as well as Brigham and Women's Hospital Endocrine-Hypertension Division. In the 1990s, she returned from the United States and rejoined the University of Chile.

Canessa died on 1 February 1997.
