= Oscar Osburn Winther =

American historian

Oscar Osburn Winther (22 December 1903, Weeping Water, Nebraska – 22 May 1970, Bloomington, Indiana) was a history professor, specializing in the history of the western United States. He was the president of the Western History Association from 1963 to 1964 and the president of the Oral History Association from 1969 to 1970.

== Biography ==
Winther was born into a Danish-American family as the youngest of six sons. The novelist Sophus Keith Winther was one of his five brothers. After secondary education at Eugene, Oregon's Eugene High School, Oscar Winther matriculated at the University of Oregon and graduated there in 1925 with a bachelor's degree in history. For several years he worked in canneries and taught high school to save money for graduate school. He became a graduate student in history and graduated in 1928 with an M.A. from Harvard University and in 1934 with a Ph.D. from Stanford University. His doctoral dissertation is titled The Express and Stagecoach Business in California, 1848–60.

After receiving his Ph.D., Winther held visiting positions at Stanford University and the San Jose Adult Education Center. From 1936 to 1937 he was an assistant curator of the Wells Fargo Bank and Union Trust Company Museum in San Francisco. In August 1937 he married Mary Merriam Galey (1910–1984). In the history department of Indiana University, he was an instructor from 1937 to 1943, an assistant professor from 1943 to 1947, an associate professor from 1947 to 1950, and a full professor from 1950 until his death in 1970. He was named a University Professor of History in 1965. He was a visiting professor at Johns Hopkins University, the University of Oregon, Brigham Young University, the University of Washington, the University of New Mexico, and Stanford University. He was the editor-in-chief of the Mississippi Valley Historical Review from 1963 to 1964 and oversaw the Review's transformation into the Journal of American History, of which he was the editor-in-chief from 1964 to 1966.

Winther’s dozen books, seventy articles, and more than one hundred book reviews covered a wide swathe of historical terrain. His core interest, as represented by Express and Stagecoach Days in California (1936) and The Transportation Frontier: Trans-Mississippi West, 1865-1890 (1964), was nineteenth-century western transportation, particularly the ways in which stagecoaches, wagon trails, railroads, and steamships shaped the economy and society of the U.S. West. He also published on the Pacific Northwest, especially in The Great Northwest (1947), and on Danish agricultural and political history.

Winther was awarded Fulbright Fellowships in 1952 and 1965 and a Guggenheim fellowship in 1959. He was elected a Fellow of the UK's Royal Historical Society and a Fellow of the Society of American Historians.

Upon his death he was survived by his widow, a son, a daughter, and four brothers. In 1970 the Western History Association Council established the Oscar O. Winther award given each academic year in recognition of the peer-reviewed article judged to be the best published for that past year in the Western Historical Quarterly.

== Articles ==
- Winther, Oscar Osburn (1934). "Stage-Coach Service in Northern California, 1849-52". Pacific Historical Review. 3 (4): 386–399. doi:10.2307/3633143. JSTOR 3633143.
- ——— (1940). "The Roads and Transportation of Territorial Oregon". Oregon Historical Quarterly. 41 (1): 40–52. JSTOR 20611230.
- ———; Galey, Rose Dodge (1940). "Mrs. Butler's 1853 Diary of Rogue River Valley". Oregon Historical Quarterly. 41 (4): 337–366. JSTOR 20611293.
- ——— (1944). "The Soldier Vote in the Election of 1864". New York History. 25 (4): 440–458. JSTOR 23148753.
- ——— (1945). "Early Commercial Importance of the Mullan Road". Oregon Historical Quarterly. 46 (1): 22–35. JSTOR 20611595.
- ——— (1947). "The Rise of Metropolitan Los Angeles, 1870-1900". Huntington Library Quarterly. 10 (4): 391–405. doi:10.2307/3815801. JSTOR 3815801.
- ——— (1953). "The Colony System of Southern California". Agricultural History. 27 (3): 94–103. JSTOR 3739845.
- ——— (1956). "Promoting the American West in England, 1865–1890". The Journal of Economic History. 16 (4): 506–513. doi:10.1017/S0022050700059106. S2CID 154650166.
- ——— (1964). "English Migration to the American West 1865-1900". Huntington Library Quarterly. 27 (2): 159–173. doi:10.2307/3816923. JSTOR 3816923.
- ——— (1967). "The British in Oregon Country: A Triptych View". The Pacific Northwest Quarterly. 58 (4): 179–187. JSTOR 40488428.

== Books ==
- Story of San Jose, 1777-1869 : California's first pueblo. San Francisco: California Historical Society. 1935; 54 pages
- Express and stagecoach days in California. Stanford University, California: Stanford University Press. 1936.
- Trans-Mississippi West: a guide to its periodical literature (1811-1938). Bloomington, Indiana: Indiana University. 1942.
- Via western express & stagecoach. Stanford University, California: Stanford University Press. 1945.
- Great Northwest : a history. New York: A.A. Knopf. 1947.
- Old Oregon country; a history of frontier trade, transportation, and travel. Stanford, California: Stanford University Press. 1950.
- Development of the American far West. Bloomington, Indiana: Indiana University Press. 1951.
- Classified bibliography of the periodical literature of the trans-Mississippi West, 1811–1957. Bloomington: Indiana University Press. 1961.
- with William H. Cartwright: Story of our heritage. Boston: Ginn. 1962.
- Transportation frontier: trans-Mississippi West, 1865-1890. New York: Holt, Rinehart and Winston. 1964. pp. 224 pages.

=== as editor ===
- With Sherman to the sea; the Civil War letters, diaries & reminiscences of Theodore F. Upson, edited with an introduction by Oscar Osborn Winther. University Station, Baton Rouge, Louisiana: Louisiana State University Press. 1943; Theodore F. Upson, 1845–1919, author
- To Oregon in 1852, letter of Dr. Thomas White, La Grange County, Indiana, emigrant, Edited by Oscar O. Winther and Gayle Thornbrough. Indianapolis: Indiana Historical Society. 1964; White, Thomas, 1796–1859, author
- Private papers and diary of Thomas Leiper Kane, a friend of the Mormons; with an introduction and edited by Oscar Osborn Winther. San Francisco: Gelber-Lilienthal, inc. 1937; Kane, Thomas L. (Thomas Leiper), 1822–1883, author

=== as translator ===
- Hanssen, Hans Peter (1955). Lutz, Ralph H. (ed.). The Diary of a Dying Empire. Bloomington, Indiana: Indiana University Press; liii+409 pages; translated by Oscar O. Winther
