= Horton Davies =

Welsh Protestant minister and historian (1916–2005)

The Reverend Horton Davies
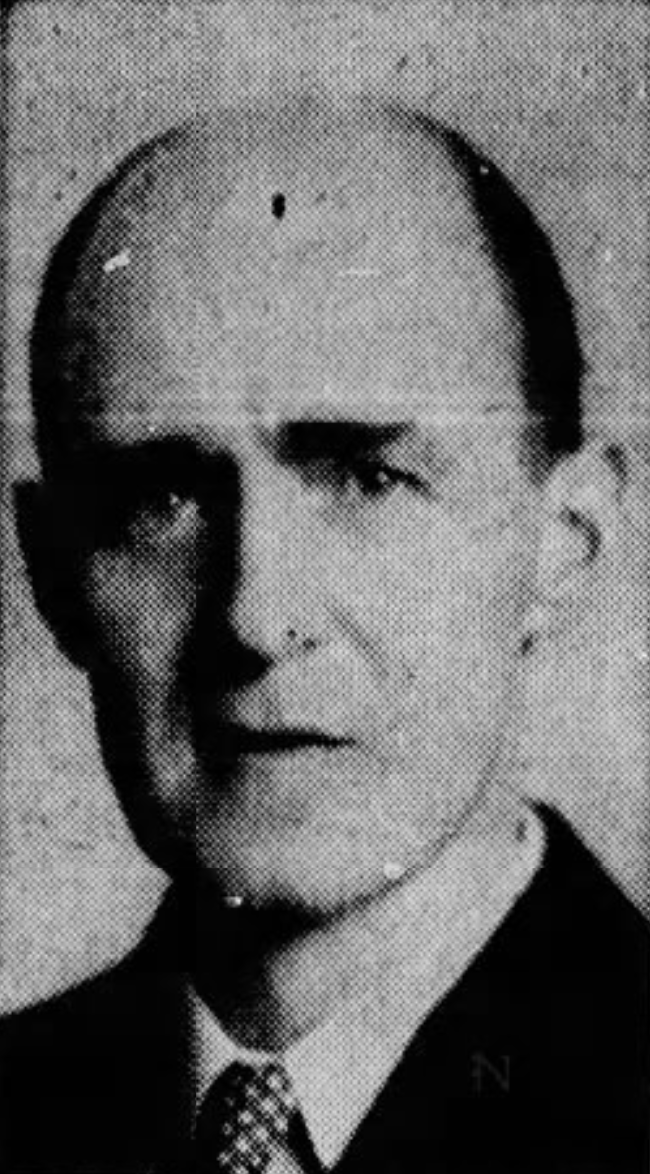
- Born: Horton Marlais Davies; 10 March 1916; Port Talbot, Wales
- Died: 11 May 2005 (aged 89); Princeton, New Jersey, U.S.
- Education: M. A., Edinburgh, 1937; B. D., Edinburgh, 1940; D. Phil., Oxford, 1943; D. Div., South Africa, 1951
- Occupations: Minister; historian; painter

Horton Marlais Davies (10 March 1916 – 11 May 2005) was a Welsh Protestant minister, historian of Christianity, and painter. After receiving degrees from the University of Edinburgh and the University of Oxford, he became the minister of Wallington and Carshalton Congregational Church in London in 1942, holding that position through World War II. From 1945 to 1946, he worked in Germany as a director of education for the YMCA, affiliated with the British Army of the Rhine.

Davies began a professorial career in 1947 at Rhodes University, where he was hired to be part of South Africa's first program for training English-speaking Protestant clergy. He later worked for the University of Oxford as head of the Department of Church History at Mansfield College, and thereafter for Princeton University to help launch a new postgraduate education program in the Department of Religion. In 1959 he was appointed to Princeton's Henry W. Putnam endowed professorship. Across his career, Davies wrote more than thirty books, including the five-volume Worship and Theology in England. After retiring, Davies took up painting, creating at least fifty works. He died in Princeton, New Jersey.

== Childhood and education ==
Horton Marlais Davies was born on 10 March 1916, to David Dorian Marlais Davies, a Christian minister, and Martha Reid Davies in Port Talbot, South Wales. Raised in Wales, Horton Davies went on to attend the University of Edinburgh, there earning a Master of Arts degree in English in 1937 and a Bachelor of Divinity for systematic theology in 1940. He subsequently earned a Doctor of Philosophy degree at Mansfield and St. Catherine's Colleges, Oxford in 1943.

== Career ==
Davies began as a minister at Wallington and Carshalton Congregational Church, with his first service held 19 July 1942. The church was located in a part of London nicknamed "Flying Bomb Alley" during World War II for the many bombs dropped on it. In October 1945, he became a YMCA director of education for the British Army of the Rhine in Germany, where he oversaw recreational centres in Belgium, France, Germany, and the Netherlands. He concluded his time as director of education in April 1946, returning to his ministry at Wallington and Carshalton Congregational, where his last service was on 10 November 1946.

In December 1946, Davies moved to South Africa, hired onto the faculty of Rhodes University to staff the first South African university program for training English-language Protestant ministers. Davies began working there in 1947, and during his time at Rhodes he acted as dean of divinity faculty from 1951 to 1953. In 1951, he earned a Doctor of Divinity degree at the University of South Africa in Pretoria, and he chaired the Congregational Union of South Africa in 1953. Davies affiliated with Reformed Christianity.

The University of Oxford hired Davies to head its Mansfield College Department of Church History in 1953, and he worked there until 1956. In 1956, Davies took a position at Princeton University's Department of Religion and helped the department launch a new postgraduate education program. He was appointed to the Henry W. Putnam endowed professorship in 1959. On 10 May 1961, Davies spoke at Lehigh University's Conference on Religion in an address criticizing "churches and synagogues" in South Africa for their "responsibility for the situation" of Apartheid, averring religious leaders had "made God in their own image and made him a white God".

Davies received a Guggenheim Fellowship from 1959 to 1960, and again for 1964 to 1965, funding research on the history of how Christians in England worshipped. This research was published as Davies's multivolume Worship and Theology in England. The product of fifteen years of research, it was praised as a "great work" by The Guardian, and the academic journal Church History called it "a major achievement in our age, and an unprecedented one in any age". The New York Times remembered Worship and Theology as "his most important work", and Religion and American Culture retrospectively called it "highly regarded".

During the 1960s, Davies held visiting positions at multiple institutions, including the Pacific School of Religion, Princeton Theological Seminary, and Union Theological Seminary. In 1978, Davies joined several other New Jersey professors in inaugurating a liturgical studies program at Drew University.

== Retirement ==
Davies retired in 1984, becoming Henry W. Putnam professor emeritus. After retiring, he took up painting with an interest in still life and depicting church settings. The Princeton Day School's Anne Reid Gallery displayed fifty of Davies's paintings in an exhibition open from 11 January 1992, to 13 February. He affiliated with the United Church of Christ. Davies died on 11 May 2005, in Princeton, New Jersey.

== Selected works ==
Across his life, Davies wrote more than thirty books. He specialized in Christianity's influence on creative work.

- Davies, Horton (1948). The Worship of the English Puritans. Dacre Press.
- — (1951). Great South African Christians. Oxford University Press.
- — (1952). The English Free Churches. Oxford University Press.
- — (1954). Christian Deviations: The Challenge of the Sects. S. C. M. Press.
- — (1957). Christian Worship: Its History and Meaning. Abingdon.
- — (1959). A Mirror of the Ministry in Modern Novels. Oxford University Press. ISBN 978-1125968352.
- — (1961–1975). Worship and Theology in England. Vol. 1–5. Princeton University Press.
- — (1963). Varieties of English Preaching, 1900–1960. S. C. M.
- —; Davies, Hugh (1978). Sacred Art in a Secular Century. Liturgical Press. ISBN 978-0814609705.
- —; Davies, Marie-Hélène (1982). Holy Days and Holidays: The Medieval Pilgrimage to Compostela. Bucknell University Press.
- — (1984). Catching the Conscience: Essays on Religion and Literature. Cowley.
- — (1986). Like Angels from a Cloud: The English Metaphysical Preachers, 1588–1645. Huntington Library. ISBN 978-0873280884.
- — (1990). The Worship of the American Puritans, 1629–1730. Peter Lang. ISBN 0-8204-1222-8.
- — (1992). The Vigilant God: Providence in the Thought of Augustine, Aquinas, Calvin, and Barth. Peter Lang. ISBN 0-8204-1496-4.
- — (1993). A Church Historian's Odyssey: A Memoir. William B. Eerdmans Publishing Company.
