= Dorothy Van Ghent =

American literary scholar (1907–1967)

- Born: Dorothy Bendon; 1907; Montana, U.S.
- Died: January 17, 1967 (aged 59–60); Rome, Italy
- Occupation: Literary scholar
- Children: 1
- Awards: Guggenheim Fellowship (1959)

Academic background
- Education: Mills College (BA); University of California, Berkeley (PhD)
- Thesis: Image-types and Antithetical Structure in the Work of Keats (1942)

Dorothy Bendon Van Ghent (1907 – January 17, 1967) was an American literary scholar. She wrote several books, including The English Novel (1953) and Keats: The Myth of the Hero (1983), the latter of which was published after her death. She was an English literature professor at Bard College, University of Kansas, University of Vermont, and Brandeis University.

== Biography ==
Dorothy Bendon was born in 1907 in Montana. (Note: Sources differ on whether the exact place is Glendive or Missoula.) Her father was a Montana pioneer who worked in one of the state's first school teaching positions.

After a year at Montana State University, Van Ghent attended Mills College, where she obtained a BA in 1929 and MA in 1936. She also attended the University of Lausanne, Villa Collina Ridente, and University of Graz in the interim between her Mills degrees. She later obtained a PhD in English literature from the University of California, Berkeley in 1942. Her doctoral dissertation was titled Image-types and Antithetical Structure in the Work of Keats. She was a 1955-1956 Ford Foundation fellow.

After working as an instructor in English at the University of Minnesota and University of Montana, Van Ghent later moved to Mexico, where she worked as head of the American School in Taxco from 1944 to 1945. Returning to the United States, she joined Bard College as assistant professor of English from 1946 to 1947. She held that same position at the University of Kansas (1947-1952), University of Vermont (1952-1958), and Brandeis University (1958-?). She joined the University at Buffalo in 1965 and held the title of professor of English literature.

Van Ghent published her book Mirror Images in 1931, and she was a contributor to the Federal Writers' Project-created anthology American Stuff; in 1937, Eda Lou Walton of The New York Times said that Van Ghent "impressionist poem of San Francisco is somewhat clearer" than what Kenneth Rexroth contributed to the book. In 1953, she published The English Novel through Rinehart and Company; The Buffalo News reported that several critics found it to "[provide] a new yard-stick for measuring the quality of a great novel". Daniel R. Schwarz said that her "major legacy is that she provides a theory and critical examples to those who wished to apply aesthetic formalism to novels." She also wrote an Edith Wharton biography and co-edited with Willard Maas a volume of readings for English composition students. In 1959, she was awarded a Guggenheim Fellowship for "studies of certain major European novelists in the 19th and 20th centuries".

Van Ghent lived in Allentown, Buffalo shortly before her death. She also had a son and grandchild.

While on a research trip in Italy to study John Keats' poetry, Van Ghent died on January 17, 1967, in Rome, aged 60, due to a heart attack. Her next book Keats: The Myth of the Hero was completed by Jeffrey Cane Robinson and posthumously released by Princeton University Press in 1983.

== Bibliography ==
- The English Novel (1953) (Note: Reviews of this book:)
- Keats: The Myth of the Hero (1983, revised and edited by Jeffrey Cane Robinson) (Note: Reviews of this book:)
