= Harry W. Fritts Jr. =

American physician and professor of medicine

Harry Washington Fritts Jr. (4 October 1921, Rockwood, Tennessee – 22 April 2011, Northport, New York) was an American physician, professor of medicine, and the founding chair of the Department of Medicine of the Stony Brook University School of Medicine.

== Biography ==
Born in a coal mining town in eastern Tennessee, Fritts attended Vanderbilt University and then transferred to the Massachusetts Institute of Technology, where he graduated with a bachelor's degree in electrical engineering.

In 1942, he enlisted in the navy, achieving the position of Commanding Officer, USS LST 461. He served in the Asiatic-Pacific Theater (Four Stars) and in the Philippine Liberation (Two Stars). He was involved in the invasions of Saipan, Tinian, Leyte Gulf, Nasugbu Bay, Linguyan Gulf, Okinawa, and a participant in the Second Battle of the Philippine Sea.

After leaving the U.S. Navy in 1946, he became a medical student and graduated in 1951 with an M.D. from the Boston University School of Medicine. After completing his internship and residency in Boston, he became a research fellow in the Cardio-Pulmonary Laboratory at Manhattan's Bellevue Hospital. There he was supervised and mentored by André Cournand and Dickinson W. Richards. When Cournand retired in 1964, Fritts became his successor as the laboratory director specializing in cardio-pulmonary physiology. When Bellevue's Cardio-Pulmonary Laboratory closed in 1968, the Laboratory's personnel moved to the Columbia Presbyterian Medical Center and Fritts was appointed the Dickson W. Richards Professor of Medicine at the Columbia University College of Physicians and Surgeons. He retained that professorship until he became in April 1973 the founding chair of the medical department of Stony Brook University School of Medicine, which was founded in 1971. At that time, there were 48 students enrolled in two classes (Class of 1974 and Class of 1975). At the Stony Brook University School of Medicine (on Long Island), he was the Edmund D. Pellegrino Professor of Medicine, as well as the chair of the medical department, from 1973 until 1987, when he retired.

From 1958 to 1973 Fritts was the author or co-author of approximately 30 scientific papers. He was a Guggenheim Fellow for the academic year 1959–1960. In 1997 the Johns Hopkins University Press published his book On Leading a Clinical Department: A Guide for Physicians.

He was predeceased by his wife Helen (1923–2010). Upon his death he was survived by three children and five grandchildren.

== Selected publications ==
- Fishman, A. P.; Himmelstein, A.; Fritts Jr., H. W.; Cournand, A. (1955). "Blood flow through each lung in man during unilateral hypoxia" (PDF). The Journal of Clinical Investigation. 34 (4): 637–646. doi:10.1172/JCI103113. PMC 438670. PMID 14367518.
- Fritts Jr., H. W.; Harris, P.; Clauss, R. H.; Odell, J. E.; Cournand, A. (1958). "The effect of acetylcholine on the human pulmonary circulation under normal and hypoxic conditions" (PDF). The Journal of Clinical Investigation. 37 (1): 99–11. doi:10.1172/JCI103590. PMC 293061. PMID 13491717.
- Fritts Jr., H. W.; Cournand, A. (1958). "The Application of the Fick Principle to the Measurement of Pulmonary Blood Flow". Proceedings of the National Academy of Sciences of the United States of America. 44 (10): 1079–1087. Bibcode:1958PNAS...44.1079F. doi:10.1073/pnas.44.10.1079. PMC 528697. PMID 16590311.
- Chidsey, C. A.; Fritts Jr., H. W.; Hardewig, A.; Richards, D. W.; Cournand, A. (1959). "Fate of radioactive krypton (Kr^{85}) introduced intravenously in man". Journal of Applied Physiology. 14 (1): 63–66. doi:10.1152/jappl.1959.14.1.63. PMID 13630828.
- Fritts Jr., H. W.; Filler, J.; Fishman, A. P.; Cournand, A. (1959). "The efficiency of ventilation during voluntary hyperpnea: studies in normal subjects and in dyspneic patients with either chronic pulmonary emphysema or obesity" (PDF). The Journal of Clinical Investigation. 38 (8): 1339–1348. doi:10.1172/JCI103909. PMC 442088. PMID 13673090.
- Fishman, Alfred P.; Fritts Jr., Harry W.; Cournand, André (1960). "Effects of Acute Hypoxia and Exercise on the Pulmonary Circulation". Circulation. 22 (2): 204–215. doi:10.1161/01.cir.22.2.204. PMID 13700011.
- Fritts Jr., Harry W.; Rochester, Dudley F. (1973). "Respiratory Stimulants and Obstructed Airways". New England Journal of Medicine. 288 (9): 464–465. doi:10.1056/NEJM197303012880909. PMID 4683920.
- Thomas, Henry M.; Lefrak, Stephen S.; Irwin, Richard S.; Fritts Jr., Harry W.; Caldwell, Peter R.B. (1974). "The oxyhemoglobin dissociation curve in health and disease". The American Journal of Medicine. 57 (3): 331–348. doi:10.1016/0002-9343(74)90129-6. ISSN 0002-9343. PMID 4416399.
