= List of Guggenheim Fellowships awarded in 1961 =

Two hundred and sixty-five scholars and artists were awarded Guggenheim Fellowships in 1961. More than $1,350,000 was disbursed.

== 1961 U.S. and Canadian Fellows ==
Category	Field of Study	Fellow	Institutional association	Research topic	Notes	Ref
Creative Arts	Choreography	Paul Taylor	Paul Taylor Dance Company		Also won in 1966, 1983	
Creative Arts	Drama and Performance Art	Robert Goode Hogan		Creative writing in drama		
Creative Arts	Fiction	George Paul Elliott	University of Iowa, Barnard College	Writing	Also won in 1970	
Creative Arts	Fiction	Curtis A. Harnack	Sarah Lawrence College	Writing		
Creative Arts	Fiction	John C. Keats		Writing		
Creative Arts	Fiction	Paule Burke Marshall		Writing		
Creative Arts	Fiction	Grace Paley	Greenwich Village Peace Center	Writing		
Creative Arts	Fiction	Mordecai Richler		Writing		
Creative Arts	Fine Arts	Harold Altman	University of Wisconsin	Drawing and printmaking	Also won in 1960	
Creative Arts	Fine Arts	Al Blaustein	The Art Center of Northern New Jersey	Printmaking	Also won in 1958	
Creative Arts	Fine Arts	Edward Colker				
Creative Arts	Fine Arts	Worden Day			Also won in 1952	
Creative Arts	Fine Arts	Arthur Deshaies		Creative printmaking		
Creative Arts	Fine Arts	Jimmy Ernst	Brooklyn College	Painting		
Creative Arts	Fine Arts	Gray Foy		Drawing		
Creative Arts	Fine Arts	Robert W. Hansen	Occidental College			
Creative Arts	Fine Arts	David Vincent Hayes		Sculpting		
Creative Arts	Fine Arts	Jerome Eugene Kaplan	Philadelphia College of Art	Printmaking		
Creative Arts	Fine Arts	Daniel U. Newman		Painting		
Creative Arts	Fine Arts	John W. Rhoden		Sculpting		
Creative Arts	Fine Arts	George Warren Rickey	Rensselaer Polytechnic Institute, Tulane University	Sculpting	Also won in 1960	
Creative Arts	Music Composition	Halim El-Dabh		Composing	Also won in 1959	
Creative Arts	Music Composition	Arnold Franchetti	University of Hartford	Composing		
Creative Arts	Music Composition	Karl George Kohn	Pomona College	Composing		
Creative Arts	Music Composition	Theodore S. Newman	University of Miami	Composing		
Creative Arts	Music Composition	Burrill Phillips	University of Illinois	Composing	Also won in 1942	
Creative Arts	Music Composition	William Overton Smith	University of Southern California	Composing	Also won in 1960	
Creative Arts	Photography	Bruce L. Davidson		Youth in America		
Creative Arts	Photography	John Szarkowski		Study of Quetico Provincial Park-Superior National Forest in Canada and the United States	Also won in 1954	
Creative Arts	Poetry	Wendell Erdman Berry		Writing		
Creative Arts	Poetry	Kay Boyle		Eminent figures in German history	Also won in 1934	
Creative Arts	Poetry	James Dickey	Burke-Dowling-Adams	Writing		
Creative Arts	Poetry	Kenneth Koch		Writing		
Creative Arts	Poetry	George Edwin Starbuck	Houghton Mifflin Company	Writing		
Humanities	American Literature	Everett Carter	University of California, Davis	Idea of progress in American literature	Also won in 1952	
Humanities	American Literature	Clarence Louis Frank Gohdes	Duke University	Work on proposed bibliography of regional literature and drama in the U.S.		
Humanities	American Literature	Leo Marx	Amherst College	Pastoral impulse in American literature and thought	Also won in 1965	
Humanities	American Literature	William Harwood Peden	University of Missouri	American short story between 1940 and 1960		
Humanities	Architecture, Planning and Design	Harold Edelman				
Humanities	Architecture, Planning and Design	Stanley Salzman	Pratt Institute, New York School of Interior Design			
Humanities	Architecture, Planning and Design	Eduard Sekler	Harvard University	Urban design	Also won in 1963	
Humanities	Architecture, Planning and Design	Rudolf Jacob Wittkower	Columbia University			
Humanities	Bibliography	Donald C. Gallup	Yale University	Bibliographical studies of the works of Ezra Pound	Also won in 1968	
Humanities	Bibliography	Edwin Wolf II	Library Company of Philadelphia			
Humanities	Biography	Irvin Ehrenpreis	Indiana University	Life of Jonathan Swift	Also won in 1955	
Humanities	British History	Sidney Alexander Burrell	Barnard College			
Humanities	British History	Margaret Gay Davies	Pomona College	Continuing work started by her father on economic fluctuations in the Restoration Period of England		
Humanities	British History	William Roger Graham	University of Saskatchewan	Second volume of biography on Arthur Meighen		
Humanities	British History	Alfred M. Gollin	University of California, Los Angeles		Also won in 1964, 1971	
Humanities	British History	William Best Hesseltine	University of Wisconsin	Manuscript jornals, in several languages, of Hekekyan Bey		
Humanities	British History	Thomas H. D. Mahoney	Massachusetts Institute of Technology	Edmund Burke and the American Revolution		
Humanities	British History	Leo Frank Solt	Indiana University	Sectarian tracts of the Commonwealth and The Protectorate		
Humanities	Classics	Francis Dvornik	Dumbarton Oaks Research Library	Origin of early Christian political philosophy		
Humanities	Classics	Kenan Tevfik Erim				
Humanities	Classics	Herbert Hoffman	Museum für Kunst und Gewerbe Hamburg		Also won in 1972	
Humanities	Classics	Sesto Prete	Fordham University			
Humanities	Classics	Cedric Hubbell Whitman	Harvard University	Aristophanes as a comic poet	Also won in 1976	
Humanities	East Asian Studies	Harry J. Benda	Yale University	Social and political history of Southeast Asia since 1950		
Humanities	East Asian Studies	Relman Morin	Associated Press	Origins of colonialism in the Far East		
Humanities	East Asian Studies	Donald Keene	Columbia University		Also won in 1971	
Humanities	Economic History	Charles Issawi	Columbia University		Also won in 1968	
Humanities	English Literature	John Lewis Bradley	Mount Holyoke College	Life and works of Henry Mayhew		
Humanities	English Literature	Dwight Culler	Yale University	Poetry of Matthew Arnold	Also won in 1975	
Humanities	English Literature	Joseph Frank	University of Rochester	Poetry of the period from 1641 to 1660	Also won in 1958	
Humanities	English Literature	Walter John Hipple, Jr.	Cornell College	19th century British philosophy from the time of Dugald Stewart to that of Samuel Alexander		
Humanities	English Literature	Dan H. Laurence		Shavian research	Also won in 1960, 1972	
Humanities	English Literature	Lowry Nelson, Jr.	University of California, Los Angeles			
Humanities	English Literature	Robert Ornstein	University of Illinois	Shakespeare's history plays in relation to Elizabethan historical and political thought		
Humanities	English Literature	David Dodd Perkins	Harvard University	Life and poetry of William Wordsworth	Also won in 1972	
Humanities	English Literature	John Henry Raleigh	University of California, Berkeley	English fiction from Dickens to Joyce		
Humanities	English Literature	Charles H. Shattuck	University of Illinois	English language prompt books of Shakespeare's plays	Also won in 1968	
Humanities	English Literature	George Robert Stange	University of Minnesota	Poetry of Matthew Arnold		
Humanities	English Literature	Frank W. Wadsworth	University of California, Los Angeles	Revivals of Elizabethan plays in 19th century United States and England		
Humanities	English Literature	Harris Ward Wilson	University of Illinois	H. G. Wells and the Fabian Society		
Humanities	English Literature	Andrew Wright	Ohio State University		Also won in 1970	
Humanities	Fine Arts Research	Wen Fong	Princeton University			
Humanities	Fine Arts Research	Curtis Howard Shell	Wellesley College	Florentine painting of early Renaissance		
Humanities	Folklore and Popular Culture	Felix Johannes Oinas	Indiana University	Relationship of Russian and Balto-Finnic folklore and linguistics	Also won in 1966	
Humanities	Folklore and Popular Culture	Harry Oster	Louisiana State University			
Humanities	French History	David Duckworth Bien	Princeton University			
Humanities	French History	Jere Clemens King	University of California, Los Angeles			
Humanities	French History	Andrew Lossky	University of California, Los Angeles			
Humanities	French Literature	Jules Brody	Columbia University			
Humanities	French Literature	Wallace Fowlie	Bennington College	Work of Marcel Proust	Also won in 1947	
Humanities	French Literature	Raymond Dorner Giraud	Stanford University	Origins and development of the concept of art for art's sake in 19th century French literature		
Humanities	French Literature	Edward B. Ham	University of Michigan			
Humanities	French Literature	Lawrence Elliot Harvey	Dartmouth College	Writings of Samuel Beckett		
Humanities	French Literature	Neal Oxenhandler	University of California, Los Angeles	Aesthetic basis of the poetry of Max Jacob		
Humanities	French Literature	Michael Riffaterre	Columbia University		Also won in 1977	
Humanities	French Literature	Georges Markow-Totevy	Princeton University			
Humanities	General Nonfiction	Ben Haig Bagdikian	Providence Journal, Evening Bulletin	Development of contemporary American press		
Humanities	General Nonfiction	Helen Henley	Christian Science Monitor	Family farm in contemporary U.S.		
Humanities	German and East European History	Hajo Holborn	Yale University	Philosophical foundations of historical knowledge	Also won in 1954	
Humanities	German and Scandinavian Literature	Martin Dyck	University of Michigan			
Humanities	German and Scandinavian Literature	Hans Albert Maier	University of Connecticut	Goethe's West–östlicher Divan		
Humanities	German and Scandinavian Literature	Walter Friedrich Naumann	University of Wisconsin, Madison		Also won in 1951	
Humanities	Italian Literature	Eric William Cochrane Jr	University of Chicago	History of Florence		
Humanities	Italian Literature	Nicolae Iliescu	Harvard University	Petrarch's Il Canzoniere in perspective of the writings of St. Augustine		
Humanities	Italian Literature	Sergio Pacifici	Yale University	Modern Italian novel		
Humanities	Latin American Literature	Norman F. Martin	University of Santa Clara	Unemployment faced by New Spain during the 17th and 18th centuries		
Humanities	Linguistics	Nicholas C. Bodman	Foreign Service Institute	Tibeto-Burman languages		
Humanities	Literary Criticism	Robert Brustein	Columbia University			
Humanities	Literary Criticism	Murray Krieger	University of Illinois	Classic vision in post-Renaissance literature	Also won in 1956	
Humanities	Literary Criticism	Yvor Winters	Stanford University	Aspects of the short poem		
Humanities	Medieval History	David Herlihy	Bryn Mawr College			
Humanities	Medieval History	Richard Eugene Sullivan	Michigan State University	History of Christian monasticism from the fourth to the 10th century		
Humanities	Medieval Literature	Charles William Dunn	New York University			
Humanities	Medieval Literature	David C. Fowler	University of Washington		Also won in 1975	
Humanities	Medieval Literature	Robert Kaske	University of North Carolina	Heroism and the hero in Old English poetry	Also won in 1977	
Humanities	Medieval Literature	Paul Murray Kendall	Ohio University	Warwick the Kingmaker	Also won in 1957	
Humanities	Medieval Literature	Joseph Szövérffy	University of Alberta	History of vernacular lyric poetry in the Middle Ages	Also won in 1969	
Humanities	Medieval Literature	Erik Wahlgren	University of California, Los Angeles			
Humanities	Music Research	William Weaver Austin	Cornell University	Music of the 20th century		
Humanities	Music Research	Ralph Thomas Daniel	Indiana University	Origin and development of the English anthem		
Humanities	Near Eastern Studies	Ben Halpern	Harvard University	Contemporary Israel		
Humanities	Near Eastern Studies	Anne Draffkorn Kilmer	University of Chicago	Lexical texts of ancient Mesopotamia	Also won in 1962	
Humanities	Near Eastern Studies	Samuel Noah Kramer	University of Pennsylvania		Also won in 1937, 1938	
Humanities	Near Eastern Studies	William R. Polk	Harvard University	Relations of U.S. and Arab World		
Humanities	Near Eastern Studies	Isaac Rabinowitz	Cornell University	Working on an annotated translation of The Book of Honeycomb's Flow of Judah Messer Leon		
Humanities	Philosophy	J. Glenn Gray	Colorado College	Work on book tenatively titled To Make Men Seekers - A Theory of American Education		
Humanities	Philosophy	Wallace I. Matson	University of California, Berkeley	Explanatory concepts		
Humanities	Philosophy	Abraham Irving Melden	University of Washington			
Humanities	Religion	Peter de Beauvoir Brock	University of Alberta	History of pacificism		
Humanities	Religion	Edward Atkinson Dowey, Jr.	Princeton Theological Seminary	Intellectual history of the 16th and 17th centuries, with reference to religious thought in the reformed areas of Protestantism		
Humanities	Religion	James Alvin Sanders	Colgate Rochester Crozer Divinity School		Also won in 1972	
Humanities	Russian History	Alexander Dallin	Columbia University			
Humanities	Russian History	Martin Edward Malia	University of California, Berkeley	Russian radial intelligentsia from 1825 to 1917		
Humanities	Slavic Literature	Rufus Wellington Mathewson, Jr.	Columbia University			
Humanities	Spanish and Portuguese Literature	Willis R. Barnstone	Wesleyan University	Life and works of Antonio Machado		
Humanities	Spanish and Portuguese Literature	Ángel del Río	Columbia University			
Humanities	Spanish and Portuguese Literature	Edward Glaser	University of Michigan			
Humanities	Theatre Arts	Benjamin Hunningher	Columbia University			
Humanities	Theatre Arts	Dorothy Jeakins	Los Angeles Civic Light Opera			
Humanities	United States History	Arthur Bestor	University of Illinois	American constitutional development	Also won in 1953	
Humanities	United States History	Francis L. Berkeley, Jr.	University of Virginia			
Humanities	United States History	Paul Wilbur Glad	Coe College	United States from World War I to the Great Depression		
Humanities	United States History	Hugh Dodge Hawkins	Amherst College	American university presidents, 1865-1915		
Humanities	United States History	William Ransom Hogan	Tulane University			
Humanities	United States History	Stephen Guild Kurtz	Wabash College	Political philosophy and statecraft of John Adams		
Humanities	United States History	David Sievert Lavender	The Thacher School	American Fur Company	Also won in 1968	
Humanities	United States History	Samuel Eliot Morison				
Humanities	United States History	Richard B. Morris	City College of New York		Also won in 1947, 1982	
Natural Sciences	Applied Mathematics	Bernard Budiansky	Harvard University	Theory of thin shells		
Natural Sciences	Applied Mathematics	Charles Danne Graham, Jr.	University of Pennsylvania			
Natural Sciences	Applied Mathematics	David Okrent	Argonne National Laboratory	High temperature experiments	Also won in 1977	
Natural Sciences	Applied Mathematics	Robert D. Richtmyer	New York University			
Natural Sciences	Applied Mathematics	Ronald Samuel Rivlin	Brown University			
Natural Sciences	Applied Mathematics	Hans Jürgen Eduard Schmitt	Harvard University	Scattering of electromagnetic waves from acoustic disturbances		
Natural Sciences	Applied Mathematics	Richard Thorpe Shield	Brown University	Mathematical theories of elastic and plastic solids		
Natural Sciences	Applied Mathematics	Harold Staras	RCA Laboratories	Communications systems that utilize new modes of wave propagation		
Natural Sciences	Biochemistry and Molecular Biology	Horace Albert Barker	University of California, Berkeley	Biochemistry of the cobamide coenzymes	Also won in 1941	
Natural Sciences	Chemistry	Richard J. Bearman	University of Kansas	Statistical mechanics transport processes in mixtures		
Natural Sciences	Chemistry	Ernst Berliner	Bryn Mawr College			
Natural Sciences	Chemistry	Robert Kenneth Brinton	University of California	Transfer of excitation energy between molecules in solution		
Natural Sciences	Chemistry	William Andrew Chupka	Argonne National Laboratory	Mass spectrometry		
Natural Sciences	Chemistry	Robert Hugh Cole	Brown University	Equilibrium and relaxation theories of dielectrics	Also won in 1955	
Natural Sciences	Chemistry	James John Fritz	Pennsylvania State University	Low temperature research and studies in the theory of magnetism		
Natural Sciences	Chemistry	Robert Maurice Hexter	Mellon Institute	Problem of predicting the electronic and vibrational spectra of molecular crystals		
Natural Sciences	Chemistry	Kenneth Keith Innes	Vanderbilt University	Organic molecular structure		
Natural Sciences	Chemistry	Herbert August Laitinen	University of Illinois	High temperature electrochemistry	Also won in 1953	
Natural Sciences	Chemistry	William Eugene Parham	University of Minnesota	Organic chemistry		
Natural Sciences	Chemistry	John Michael Prausnitz	University of California, Berkeley	Thermodynamics of solutions	Also won in 1972	
Natural Sciences	Chemistry	Benton Seymour Rabinovitch	University of Washington			
Natural Sciences	Chemistry	Charles Norwood Reilley	University of North Carolina	Metal chelate relations		
Natural Sciences	Chemistry	Kenneth Lloyd Rinehart, Jr.	University of Illinois	Application of physical and chemical methods to problems of organic structure determination		
Natural Sciences	Chemistry	Frank Sherwood Rowland	University of Kansas	Chemical effects of nuclear transformations	Also won in 1973	
Natural Sciences	Chemistry	Zevi W. Salsburg	Rice University	Thermodynamic theory of reactive shock waves and detonations		
Natural Sciences	Chemistry	Raymond E. Shapiro	United States Department of Agriculture	Soil factors in soil-plant relationships		
Natural Sciences	Chemistry	Robert G. Shulman	Bell Telephone Laboratories			
Natural Sciences	Chemistry	William Spindel	Rutgers University–Newark	Rare oxygen isotopes		
Natural Sciences	Chemistry	Thomas Tamotsu Sugihara	Clark University	Effects of angular momentum and excitation energy in high-energy fission		
Natural Sciences	Chemistry	Dean S. Tarbell	University of Rochester	New techniques for investigations in organic chemistry	Also won in 1945	
Natural Sciences	Chemistry	Robert Ullman	Polytechnic Institute of Brooklyn			
Natural Sciences	Chemistry	Kenneth Berle Wiberg	University of Washington			
Natural Sciences	Chemistry	Benjamin Widom	Cornell University	Long-range correlations in fluids	Also won in 1968	
Natural Sciences	Earth Science	Douglas Lamar Inman	Scripps Institution of Oceanography			
Natural Sciences	Earth Science	Charles David Keeling	Scripps Institution of Oceanography			
Natural Sciences	Earth Science	Paul E. Potter	Illinois Geological Survey	Primary directional properties in sedimentary rocks		
Natural Sciences	Earth Science	Lionel Edward Weiss	University of California, Berkeley	Properties of rocks deformed by flow in the solid state	Also won in 1969	
Natural Sciences	Engineering	Boris Bresler	University of California	Improved methods of design for control of crack and formation in concrete structures		
Natural Sciences	Engineering	Ferdinand Freudenstein	Columbia University	Kinematics of mechanisms	Also won in 1967	
Natural Sciences	Engineering	William Wilson Mullins	Carnegie Institute of Technology	Theoretical problems relating to shapes and rates of changes of surfaces under various environmental conditions		
Natural Sciences	Engineering	William Tyrrell Thomson	University of California, Los Angeles			
Natural Sciences	Geography and Environmental Studies	Andrew Hill Clark	University of Wisconsin	Historical geography, especially of maritime Canada		
Natural Sciences	Geography and Environmental Studies	Sheldon Judson	Princeton University		Also won in 1966	
Natural Sciences	Geography and Environmental Studies	W. Barclay Kamb	California Institute of Technology	Relation between state of stress and preferred orientation of ice crystals in selected glaciers of the Alps	Also won in 1959	
Natural Sciences	Geography and Environmental Studies	Herold Jacob Wiens	Yale University	Historical and regional geography of Sinkiang		
Natural Sciences	Mathematics	Leon A. Henkin	University of California, Berkeley; Dartmouth College	Models of the simple theory of types		
Natural Sciences	Mathematics	Louis Norberg Howard	Massachusetts Institute of Technology	Geophysical fluid dynamics		
Natural Sciences	Mathematics	Ellis Robert Kolchin	Columbia University		Also won in 1954	
Natural Sciences	Mathematics	George Whitelaw Mackey	Harvard University	Topological groups	Also won in 1949, 1970	
Natural Sciences	Mathematics	Albert Nijenhuis	University of Chicago			
Natural Sciences	Medicine and Health	Frederik Barry Bang	Johns Hopkins University	Responses to diseases in various marine intervertebrates		
Natural Sciences	Medicine and Health	John Frederick Bell	U.S. Public Health Service	Comparative study of Eurasian and American tularemia		
Natural Sciences	Medicine and Health	Dana Charles Brooks	Cornell University Medical College	Basis of electrical activity in the mammilian brain		
Natural Sciences	Medicine and Health	Robert James Gorlin	University of Minnesota	Oral pathology book preparation		
Natural Sciences	Medicine and Health	Lawrence Ennis Savage	University of Washington	Gastric physiology		
Natural Sciences	Medicine and Health	Henry Orson Wheeler	Columbia University			
Natural Sciences	Molecular and Cellular Biology	Seymour Benzer	Purdue University	Cellular control mechanisms		
Natural Sciences	Molecular and Cellular Biology	William Clouser Boyd	Boston University School of Medicine	Immunochemical specificity	Also won in 1935, 1937	
Natural Sciences	Molecular and Cellular Biology	Herbert E. Carter	University of Illinois	Biochemistry		
Natural Sciences	Molecular and Cellular Biology	Gertrude Falk	University of Washington			
Natural Sciences	Molecular and Cellular Biology	Malcolm Stephen Gordon	University of California, Los Angeles			
Natural Sciences	Molecular and Cellular Biology	Benjamin D. Hall	University of Illinois	Molecular structure and biological specificity of ribonucleic acid synthesized in virus-infected bacteria		
Natural Sciences	Molecular and Cellular Biology	Robert Manoah Kark	University of Illinois	Nephrotic syndrome in rats	Also won in 1974	
Natural Sciences	Molecular and Cellular Biology	Robert Berner Loftfield	Harvard Medical School	Amino acid sequence of proteins		
Natural Sciences	Molecular and Cellular Biology	Robert Eugene Olson	University of Pittsburgh	Mechanism of control of certain aspects of cell metabolism in heart muscle	Also won in 1970	
Natural Sciences	Molecular and Cellular Biology	Paul Karl Stumpf	University of California, Davis	Fatty acids in plant tissues	Also won in 1968	
Natural Sciences	Molecular and Cellular Biology	Charles Wyvil Todd	DuPont	Immunology and protein synthesis		
Natural Sciences	Molecular and Cellular Biology	Charles Allen West	University of California, Los Angeles	Enzymatic mechanisms and intermediates involved in the biosynthesis of the gibberellins		
Natural Sciences	Molecular and Cellular Biology	Harry Curtis Young, Jr.	Oklahoma State University	Elimination of wheat leaf rust as a major disease problem		
Natural Sciences	Organismic Biology and Ecology	George A. Bartholomew	University of California, Los Angeles			
Natural Sciences	Organismic Biology and Ecology	Francis C. Evans	University of Michigan			
Natural Sciences	Organismic Biology and Ecology	Julius H. Freitag	University of California	Comparison of certain vectors of plant viruses		
Natural Sciences	Organismic Biology and Ecology	William Neil Holmes	University of British Columbia	How do some birds, mammals and fish manage to live in, or drink, either fresh or salt water?		
Natural Sciences	Organismic Biology and Ecology	Otto Kinne	University of Toronto			
Natural Sciences	Organismic Biology and Ecology	Lawrence B. Slobodkin	University of Michigan		Also won in 1974	
Natural Sciences	Organismic Biology and Ecology	Paul Slud	American Museum of Natural History	Birds of Cocos Island		
Natural Sciences	Organismic Biology and Ecology	Leroy Carlton Stevens, Jr.	Roscoe B. Jackson Memorial Laboratory	Microscopic tumors in early stages of development		
Natural Sciences	Organismic Biology and Ecology	Howard Elliott Winn	University of Maryland	Comparative studies of sound production as means of communication in certain fish species		
Natural Sciences	Physics	Ernst Bleuler	Purdue University	High-energy physics		
Natural Sciences	Physics	Robert Brout	Cornell University	Applications in ferromagnetism		
Natural Sciences	Physics	Sidney David Drell	Stanford University	Quantum field theory on the structure of elementary particles	Also won in 1971	
Natural Sciences	Physics	William A. Fowler	California Institute of Technology		Also won in 1954	
Natural Sciences	Physics	Hans Pieter Roetert Frederikse	National Bureau of Standards	Physical properties of oxide semi-conductors		
Natural Sciences	Physics	Donald Arthur Glaser	Lawrence Radiation Laboratory	Biophysics		
Natural Sciences	Physics	Erwin L. Hahn	University of California, Berkeley	Nuclear magnetism at low temperatures	Also won in 1969	
Natural Sciences	Physics	Bernard G. Harvey	University of California, Berkeley	Nuclear stripping and pick-up reactions		
Natural Sciences	Physics	Evans Vaughan Hayward	National Bureau of Standards	Photonuclear reactions		
Natural Sciences	Physics	Arthur Kent Kerman	Massachusetts Institute of Technology	Theory of nuclear structure		
Natural Sciences	Physics	Francis E. Low	Massachusetts Institute of Technology	Interactions of elementary particles by application of Quantum field theory		
Natural Sciences	Physics	Steven Moszkowski	University of California, Los Angeles			
Natural Sciences	Physics	David S. Saxon	University of California, Los Angeles	Optical model of the nucleus	Also won in 1956	
Natural Sciences	Physics	Jabez Curry Street	Harvard University	High-energy particle physics		
Natural Sciences	Physics	Robert Rathbun Wilson	Cornell University	Proton as revealed by high-energy electrons		
Natural Sciences	Plant Science	Henry Nathaniel Andrews	Washington University in St. Louis	Critical study of certain groups of early land plants	Also won in 1951, 1958	
Natural Sciences	Plant Science	Herbert Bashford Currier	University of California	Physiology of callose and associated phenomena in plant cells	Also won in 1954	
Natural Sciences	Plant Science	Thor Kommedahl	University of Minnesota	Relation of root-rotting organisms to residues of crop plants and weeds		
Natural Sciences	Plant Science	Hui-Lin Li	University of Pennsylvania			
Natural Sciences	Plant Science	Lewis Glen Weathers	University of California, Riverside	Effect that two or more viruses in combination have on plant growth and the role they play in diseases of plants		
Natural Sciences	Plant Science	Carl L. Withner	Brooklyn Botanical Garden, Brooklyn College	Orchids		
Natural Sciences	Statistics	Roy Radner	University of California	Problems of organization	Also won in 1965	
Natural Sciences	Statistics	Charles Max Stein	Stanford University	Application of group theory to statistics		
Social Sciences	Anthropology and Cultural Studies	David Lockwood Olmsted	University of California, Davis	Comparative American Indian linguistics		
Social Sciences	Anthropology and Cultural Studies	William Francis Shipley	University of California	Nisenan language		
Social Sciences	Economics	Richard S. Eckaus	Brandeis University	Economic characteristics of technology, particularly in metal-working industries		
Social Sciences	Economics	Jack Hirshleifer	University of California, Los Angeles			
Social Sciences	Economics	John Seneca McGee	University of Chicago	Government regulation in Spanish industry		
Social Sciences	Economics	John Michael Montias	Yale University	Present-day economic organization in Eastern Europe		
Social Sciences	Economics	Ira Oscar Scott, Jr.	Columbia University			
Social Sciences	Economics	Joseph John Spengler	Duke University	Development of economic thought		
Social Sciences	Economics	Jaroslav Vanek	Harvard University	Yugoslavia as decentralized socialist economy		
Social Sciences	Law	Franklin Johnson Pegues	Ohio State University			
Social Sciences	Political Science	Harry V. Jaffa	Ohio State University			
Social Sciences	Political Science	Wladyslaw W. Kulski	Syracuse University	National interests in contemporary France	Also won in 1969	
Social Sciences	Political Science	Norman Dunbar Palmer	University of Pennsylvania			
Social Sciences	Political Science	Paul Seabury	University of California	Non-military conflict and competition between Russia and the West		
Social Sciences	Political Science	Jacobus tenBroek	University of California	U.S. citizenship	Also won in 1953	
Social Sciences	Political Science	Panayiotis J. Vatikiotis	Indiana University	Development of Egypt from 1800 to the present		
Social Sciences	Political Science	Myron Weiner	University of Chicago	Congress party since Indian independence		
Social Sciences	Psychology	Emory L. Cowen	University of Rochester	Adjustment to auditory disability		
Social Sciences	Psychology	Eric Gustav Heinemann	Vassar College			
Social Sciences	Psychology	Harold Brenner Pepinsky	Ohio State University			
Social Sciences	Sociology	Renée Claire Fox	University of Pennsylvania			
Social Sciences	Sociology	Sidney Goldstein	Brown University			

== 1961 Latin American and Caribbean Fellows ==
Category	Field of Study	Fellow	Institutional association	Research topic	Notes	Ref
Creative Arts	Fine Arts	Luis Camnitzer	Escuela de Bellas Artes, Montevideo		Also won in 1982	
Creative Arts	Fine Arts	Sarah Grilo		Painting	Also won in 1963	
Creative Arts	Fine Arts	David Manzur Londoño	University of the Andes	Painting	Also won in 1962	
Creative Arts	Fine Arts	Armando Morales		Engraving	Also won in 1958	
Creative Arts	Music Composition	Mario Davidovsky		Composing	Also won in 1960	
Humanities	History of Science and Technology	Alair de Oliveira Gomes	Federal University of Rio de Janeiro			
Humanities	Iberian and Latin American History	Rafael Olivar-Bertrand	Universidad Nacional del Sur		Also won in 1963	
Natural Sciences	Mathematics	José Barros-Neto	Yale University		Also won in 1962	
Natural Sciences	Mathematics	Elon Lages Lima	Brazilian Center for Research in Physics		Also won in 1963	
Natural Sciences	Mathematics	Juan Carlos Merlo	University of Buenos Aires		Also won in 1962	
Natural Sciences	Mathematics	Nelson Onuchic	São Paulo State University		Also won in 1962	
Natural Sciences	Molecular and Cellular Biology	Emiliano Cabrera Juárez	National School of Biological Sciences, Mexico			
Natural Sciences	Molecular and Cellular Biology	Mitzy Canessa	University of Chile		Also won in 1959	
Natural Sciences	Neuroscience	Adolfo Davidovich Guerberof	Pontifical Catholic University of Chile			
Natural Sciences	Organismic Biology and Ecology	Federico Medem	National University of Colombia	Systematics of Colombian turtles, snakes and lizards	Also won in 1952	
Natural Sciences	Organismic Biology and Ecology	Francisco Nemenzo	University of the Philippines			
Natural Sciences	Organismic Biology and Ecology	Genaro O. Ranit	University of the Philippines		Also won in 1960	
Natural Sciences	Organismic Biology and Ecology	Leonila Vázquez García	National Autonomous University of Mexico			
Natural Sciences	Physics	Jacobo Rapaport	University of Chile			
Natural Sciences	Plant Science	Hernán Caballero Delpino	University of Concepción			
Natural Sciences	Plant Science	Milán Jorge Dimitri	National Parks, Argentina			
Natural Sciences	Plant Science	Faustino Miranda	National Autonomous University of Mexico	Manual of trees in southeastern Mexico		
Social Sciences	Anthropology and Cultural Studies	Felipe Landa Jocano	National Museum of the Philippines			

== See also ==
- Guggenheim Fellowship
- List of Guggenheim Fellowships awarded in 1960
- List of Guggenheim Fellowships awarded in 1962
