= Francine Hirsch =

American historian

Francine Hirsch is an American historian, specializing in modern Europe with a focus on Russia and the Soviet Union. She is a recipient of the Herbert Baxter Adams Prize for her book, Empire of Nations: Ethnographic Knowledge and the Making of the Soviet Union, as well as honors from the American Society of International Law, the Council of European Studies, and the Association for Slavic, East European, and Eurasian Studies for her work.

== Education and career ==
Hirsch has a B.A. from Cornell University, and completed her M.A. and Ph.D. from Princeton University. She is currently a professor of history at University of Wisconsin–Madison.

== Research and publications ==
Hirsch's first book, Empire of Nations: Ethnographic Knowledge and the Making of the Soviet Union (Cornell University Press, 2005) won the Herbert Baxter Adams Prize, awarded by the American Historical Association, in 2007. Empire of Nations also won the Wayne S. Vucinich Book Prize, sponsored by the Association for Slavic, East European, and Eurasian Studies (ASEEES) and Stanford University, in 2006, and the Council for European Studies Book Award, in 2006. (Russian translation: Империя наций. Этнографическое знание и формирование Советского Союза, 2022)

Her second book, Soviet Judgment at Nuremberg: A New History of the International Military Tribunal After World War II (New York: Oxford University Press, 2020) (Russian translation: Суд в Нюрнберге: Советский Союз и Международный военный трибунал, 2023) is a history of the Nuremberg Trials, and in 2021 won a Certificate of Merit from the American Society of International Law for "a preeminent contribution to creative scholarship".
