= Herbert H. Rowen =

American historian

Herbert Harvey Rowen (22 October 1916 in Brooklyn, New York – 31 March 1999 in Newtown, Bucks County, Pennsylvania), was a noted American historian of Early Modern Europe and "arguably the most important English-speaking historian of the Dutch Republic since John Lothrop Motley."

== Early life and education ==
The son of Joseph M. Rowen, a teacher, and his wife, Sarah Gordon Rowen, Herbert Rowen was educated entirely in New York City, from his first year in grade school through his doctorate. He earned his [B.S.S.] degree in 1936 at City College of New York. In 1938, he became assistant to the manager of Converters Paper Company in Newark, New Jersey and, two years later, on 28 June 1940, he married Mildred Ringel (died January 1999), with whom he later had three children. Rowen remained with Converters Paper until 1942, when he joined the U.S. Army Signal Corps and spent three years in England and France.

On his return to New York from military service in 1946, Rowen followed his growing interests in languages and took a position as an editorial research assistant with the American College Dictionary at Random House. On completing that job, he thought of going on to graduate work in French, but was advised by a former teacher to use his linguistic skills to study history. Following that advice, he entered Columbia University and completed his M.A. degree in history in 1948 with a thesis on "Annexation of the Congo by Belgium; a parliamentary study". Finding this too controversial a subject to carry on to doctoral research, he shifted his area of study to Early Modern Europe and became the first of many graduate students of a new Columbia University faculty member, Garrett Mattingly. Under his tutelage, Rowen completed his doctoral dissertation on "Pomponne and De Witt (1669-1671); a study of French policy on the eve of the Dutch War" and was awarded his Ph.D. at Columbia in 1951.

== Academic career ==
While still a graduate student in 1950, Brandeis University appointed Rowen an instructor in history. He taught there until 1953, when the University of Iowa appointed him assistant professor. After four years there, Elmira College appointed him associate professor in 1957. While attached to Elmira College, Rowen served as visiting associate professor at the University of California, Berkeley in 1959-60, just before the University of Wisconsin–Milwaukee appointed him a full professor in 1960. Rowen remained in Milwaukee until 1964, when Rutgers University appointed him professor of history. After having had this wide variety of teaching assignments, Rowen settled down at Rutgers for twenty-three years, remaining on the faculty there until his retirement in 1987.

== Published works ==
- German History: Some New German Views, edited by Hans Kohn and translated by Herbert H. Rowen. Boston: Beacon Press, 1954.
- Pomponne's "Relation de mon ambassade en Hollande" 1669-1671", edited by Herbert H. Rowen. Werken uitg. door het Historisch Genootschap (Utrecht), 4. ser., no. 2. Utrecht: Kemink & Zoon, 1955.
- The ambassador prepares for war; the Dutch embassy of Arnauld de Pomponne, 1669-1671. The Hague, M. Nijhoff, 1957.
- A history of early modern Europe, 1500-1815. New York: Holt, 1960
- From absolutism to Revolution: 1648-1848, edited by Herbert H. Rowen. New York: Macmillan; London: Collier-Macmillan, Ltd., 1963.
- Free Press Sources of Western Civilization series. General editor: Herbert H. Rowen. 1964-1965.
- Jacques Godechot, France and the Atlantic Revolution of the Eighteenth Century, 1770-1799, translated by Herbert H. Rowen. New York: Free Press, 1965.
- A history of early modern Europe, 1500-1815. Indianapolis, Bobbs-Merrill, 1966.
- A History of the Western World, with Bryce Lyon, Theodore S. Hamerow, Herbert H. Rowen. New York: Rand McNally, 1969.
- The Low Countries in early modern times, edited by Herbert H. Rowen. New York: Walker, [1972].
- Essays on America by Johan Huizinga, translated by Herbert H. Rowen. New York; Harper, 1972.
- Early Modern Europe: A Book of Source Readings, edited by Carl J. Ekberg and Herbert H. Rowen. AMH Publishing, 1973.
- The Dutch Republic: A Nation in the Making, by De Lamar Jensen and Herbert H. Rowen. Forum, 1976.
- John de Witt, Grand Pensionary of Holland, 1625-1672. Princeton, N.J.: Princeton University Press, 1978.
- The King’s State: proprietary dynasticism in early modern France. New Brunswick, N.J.: Rutgers University Press, 1980.
- Political ideas & institutions in the Dutch Republic: papers presented at a Clark Library seminar, 27 March 1982, by Herbert H. Rowen, Andrew Lossky. Los Angeles: William Andrews Clark Memorial Library, University of California, Los Angeles, 1985.
- John de Witt, statesman of the "true freedom" . Cambridge and New York: Cambridge University Press, 1986.
- The Princes of Orange: the stadholders in the Dutch Republic. Cambridge and New York: Cambridge University Press, 1988.
- The myth of the West: America as the last empire, by Jan Willem Schulte Nordholt; translated by Herbert H. Rowen. Grand Rapids, Mich.: W.B. Eerdmans Pub. Co., 1995.
- The rhyme and reason of politics in early modern Europe: collected essays of Herbert H. Rowen, edited by Craig E. Harline. Archives internationales d’histoire des idées = International archives of the history of ideas; 132. Dordrecht and Boston: Kluwer Academic Publishers, 1992.

== Sources ==
- Gale Contemporary Authors
- Obituary in AHA Perspectives November 1999
- References
