= Historical assessment of Klemens von Metternich =

German-born Austrian politician

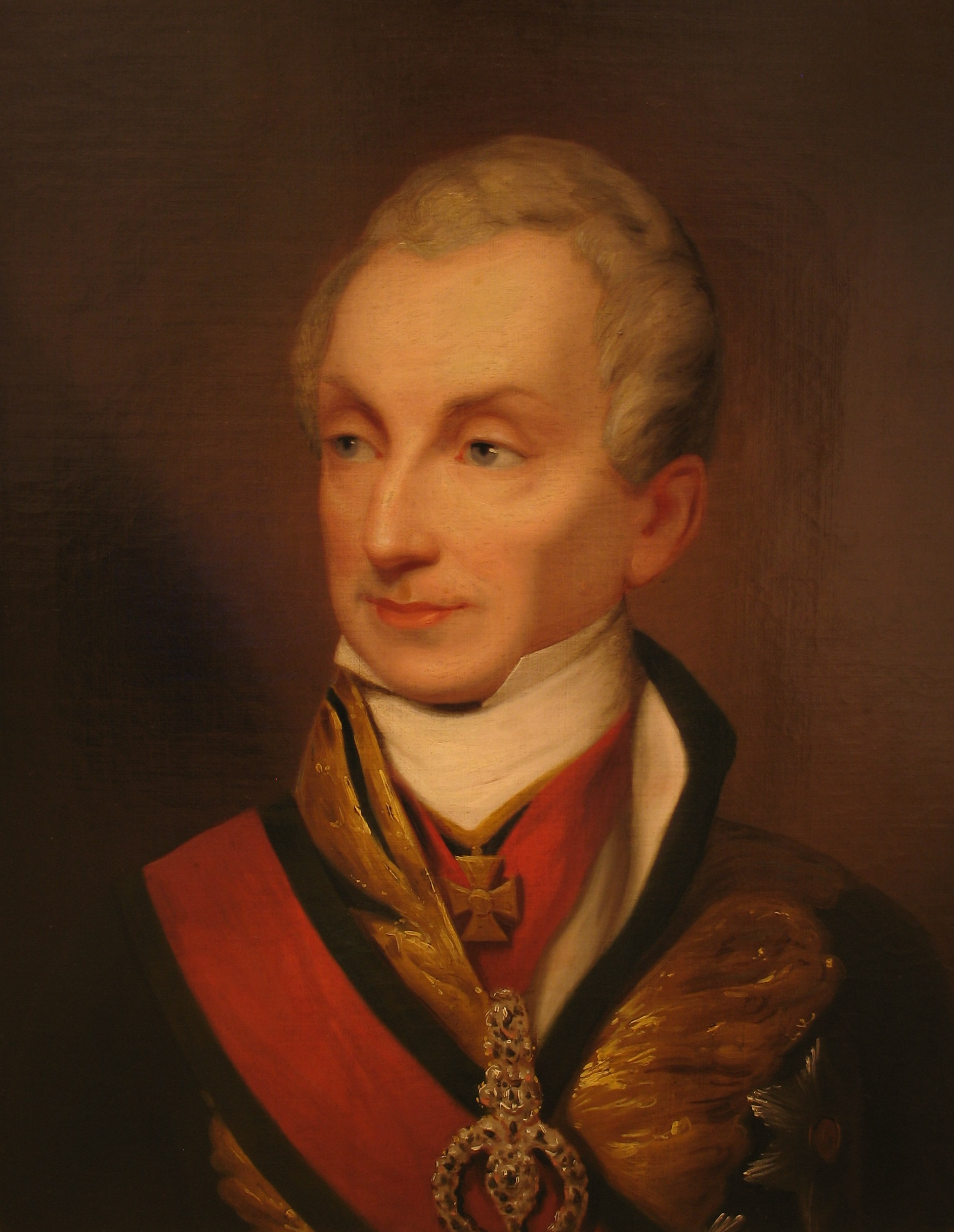
Metternich in the 1840s

Prince Klemens von Metternich was a German-born Austrian politician and statesman and one of the most important diplomats of his era, serving as the Foreign Minister of the Holy Roman Empire and its successor state, the Austrian Empire, from 1809 until the liberal revolutions of 1848 forced his resignation. His influence on historical developments on Europe has been the subject a numerous assessments. Some of the subjects that has been assessed are Metternich's over-all diplomatic skills and actual degree of influence, his role in shaping the balance of power in Europe, and his opposition to nationalist and liberal movements. Historians agree on Metternich's skill as a diplomat and his dedication to conservatism. According to Arthur May, he believed that:

the mass of Europeans yearned for security, quiet, and peace, and regarded liberal abstractions as repugnant or were utterly indifferent to them. The best of all patterns of government, he insisted, was autocratic absolutism, upheld by a loyal army, by a submissive, decently efficient bureaucracy and police machine, and by trustworthy churchmen.

== Historiography ==
For over two centuries, historians have disagreed on Metternich. Professor Enno Kraehe assembled excerpts from 17 experts, and tagged each one:

- "Traitor to France"
- "Wise Appeaser of France"
- "Unwise Appeaser of France"
- "Statesman of Philosophical Principles"
- "Vain Neurotic"
- "Responsible Statesman of International Order"
- "Short-range Opportunist"
- "Reactionary Exploiter of Germany"
- "Honest Leader Against Revolution"
- "Bulwark against Potential Fascism
- "Winner in the Diplomatic Contest for Germany"
- "Perceptive But Superficial Tinkerer"
- "Enlightened But Thwarted Reformer"
- "The Destructive Demon of Austria"
- "Statesman in Tragic Impasse"
- "Metternich Guilty"
- "Metternich Not Guilty"

== Criticism ==
Particularly in the 19th century, Metternich was heavily criticised as the man who prevented Austria and the rest of central Europe from "developing along 'normal' liberal and constitutional lines". If Metternich had not stood in the way of (in their view) progress, Austria might have reformed, dealt with the problems of nationality better, and the First World War may never have happened. Instead, Metternich fought bitterly against the forces of liberalism and nationalism, but achieved only a temporary reprieve. Indeed, Robin Okey, a critic of Metternich, suggests that the social conservatism Metternich advocated may have actually been counter-productive when it came to keeping a lid on nationalist sentiment Moreover, in pursuit of this unachievable goal, Metternich was happy to sacrifice freedom of speech: heavy censorship was just one of many repressive instruments of state available to him that also included a large spy network. Though he did not introduce the bodies, he gave them their "demoralising aspect of permanence" during his long tenure as chancellor. He also opposed electoral reform, heavily criticising the British Reform Bill introduced in 1830. A more enlightened chancellor would have realised he was involved in a battle with "the prevailing mood of his age". Instead of his zero tolerance approach, critics maintain that would have done better to have turned the current in a favourable direction; for example, the Austrian historian Viktor Bibl described Metternich as "the demon of Austria" for letting Prussia and not Austria unify Germany through his determination that Germany should not unify at all. Likewise, Metternich has been accused of excessive vanity to the point of complacency, and therefore someone ill-suited to the evolution of constitutional principles.

This view presupposes that Metternich had the ability to favourably shape Europe, but chose not to. More modern critiques, such as that included in the work of A. J. P. Taylor, have questioned just how much influence Metternich truly possessed. Okey noted that even in the realm of foreign affairs Metternich "had only his own persuasiveness to rely on", and this degraded over time. On this reading, he stuck doggedly to a set of "cumbersome" conservative principles that he was forced to articulate in long and detailed memoranda: a "smokescreen" that hid Austria's true weakness. When it came to choosing a set of sound principles, wrote Taylor, "most men could do better while shaving". The result was that Metternich was no captivating diplomatic force: Taylor described him as "the most boring man in European history"; Metternich himself boasted he could "bore men to death". This view also highlights Metternich's abject failure to live up to his reputation as the "coachman of Europe": Austria did not defeat Napoleon; Austria did not dictate the peace of Vienna; Austria could not stop France invading Spain, Britain settling the borders of Belgium or Russia deciding the fate of Turkey in 1833. Not only were his failures limited to foreign affairs, critics argue: at home he was equally powerless, failing to push through even his own proposals for administrative reform. On this basis it is argued that Metternich was essentially irrelevant both home and abroad.

== Support ==
On the other hand, Metternich's credentials as a diplomat and statesman were the focus of praise in the twentieth century from more favourable historians, particularly biographer Heinrich von Srbik. For example, particularly after the Second World War, historians were more likely to defend Metternich's policies as reasonable attempts to achieve his own goals i.e. the defence of the balance of power in Europe and the preservation of the status quo in the face of the revolutionary challenge. Even if the sort of international conspiracy Metternich imagined never existed, the Napoleonic era was a time of change which left a conservative like Metternich with few options. More sympathetic historians highlight that Metternich correctly foresaw and worked to prevent Russian dominance in Europe, succeeding where his successors would fail 130 years later. If there was a partition in Europe between conservatives and liberals, they contend that some blame must lie with the liberals such as Canning and Palmerston for their failure to compromise as Lord Castlereagh had in 1815. As argued by Srbik, Metternich himself pursued legality, cooperation and dialogue, and therefore helped ensure 30 years of peace, the "Age of Metternich". In the works of authors such as Peter Viereck and Ernst B. Haas, Metternich also gains credit for many of his more liberal ideals, even if they did not come to much; indeed, Metternich's lack of influence at court is now used to shield him from the harshest criticisms of inactivity. They argue that Metternich commendably pushed for an embryonic parliament and equal rights for the constituent states of the Empire at home, and abroad argued for equality before the law, modern bureaucracies, and fair levels of taxation. In 1847, Metternich himself denied that the Austrian Empire was anything but liberal. In this light, Metternich's methods have been seen as paternalistic, protecting Austrians from real dangers outside their borders.

Those who have attempted to rehabilitate Metternich likewise contend that, along with contemporaries Viscount Castlereagh and Charles-Maurice de Talleyrand, Metternich "unquestionably [a] master of diplomacy", someone who "perfected" and indeed shaped the nature of diplomacy in his era. For them, Metternich was "handsome, witty... [and] tenacious", by his own admission "bad at skirmishes... but good at campaigns". Likewise, Henry Kissinger's PhD dissertation about Metternich, later published in 1957, praised Metternich's role in holding together the crumbling Austrian Empire, though Kissinger's work has generated controversy in academic circles among such historians as Paul W. Schroeder, inter alia attracting criticism for the absence of footnotes. Certainly, if he was a good diplomat he certainly attracted a great deal of contemporary criticism for lying; fellow diplomats Canning and Talleyrand both commented on it, whilst the poet Franz Grillparzer suggested that Metternich came to believe his own lies. Even so, as critical historian Alan Sked argues, Metternich's "smokescreen" served a purpose in furthering a relative coherent set of principles, though it came at the expense of being in control of individual events. However, Sked is quick to also point out that Metternich's apparent liberalism, as put forward by Viereck and Haas, did not amount to wanting decentralisation, and as such the old concerns that Metternich pushed for a (now outmoded) heavily centralised autocratic system cannot be dismissed. Sked does, however, warn against the use of hindsight, arguing that Metternich's actions were, at the time, entirely in keeping with Austrian politics, and that the events of 1848 were a mere blip when Austria lost its nerve.

Julius Evola, described as "antiegalitarian, antiliberal, antidemocratic, and antipopular", author of Revolt Against the Modern World, saw Metternich as a conservative ideal.

== Bibliography ==
- Bertier de Sauvigny, Guillaume de (1962). Metternich and his times. Ryde, Peter (trans.). London: Darton, Longman and Todd.
- Ford, Franklin L. (June 1971). Europe, 1780–1830. Hong Kong: Longman. ISBN 978-0-582-48346-0.
- Goodrick-Clarke, Nicholas (2002). Black Sun: Aryan Cults, Esoteric Nazism, and the Politics of Identity. New York University Press.
- Okey, Robin (2001). The Habsburg monarchy, c. 1765–1918. Macmillan. ISBN 978-0-333-39654-4.
- Palmer, Alan (1972). Metternich: Councillor of Europe (1997 reprint ed.). London: Orion. ISBN 978-1-85799-868-9.
- Sked, Alan (1983). "Metternich". History Today. 33 (61983).
- Sked, Alan. "Explaining the Habsburg Empire, 1830–90." in Pamela Pilbeam, ed., Themes in Modern European History 1830-1890 (Routledge, 2002) pp. 141-176.
