= Programmed Inequality =

2017 nonfiction book

- Author: Mar Hicks
- Genre: Non-fiction
- Publisher: MIT Press
- Publication date: 2017
- Awards: Sally Hacker Prize from the Society for the History of Technology

Programmed Inequality: How Britain Discarded Women Technologists and Lost Its Edge in Computing is a 2017 non-fiction book by historian of technology Mar Hicks. The book was published by the MIT Press. The book the examines the systematic dismissal and marginalization of female computer workers.

== Reception ==
The book received both critical and positive reviews from historians, sociologists, and technology critics. The book was reviewed for archival research and a compelling macroeconomic argument. A review in the British Journal for the History of Science praised Hicks for integrating feminist theory into the history of technology. The review said the book makes a very strong point. It proves that new technology does not always lead to social progress. Harvard magazine wrote a short review of the book. The review said that It proves that treating women unfairly causes real damage. A review in Scientia Canadensis discussed the book. It noted that the text expands the history of women in information technology. The review noted that the book focuses on ordinary workers rather than famous figures. The review also highlighted the book's focus on modern Silicon Valley. The book notes that dividing jobs by gender becomes accepted as normal. It argues that this harms society.

== Awards ==
The book has won several major awards. In 2018 it won the Sally Hacker Prize from the Society for the History of Technology. The book won Association of American Publishers, PROSE Award. The book won the American Historical Association, Herbert Baxter Adams Prize in European History in 2017.
