= Max Bergholz =

American historian

- Born: Pittsburgh, Pennsylvania, United States
- Citizenship: Canadian; US
- Title: Professor
- Awards: 2026 Dan David Prize; 2019 Laura Shannon Prize; 2018 European Studies Book Award; 2017 Herbert Baxter Adams Prize; 2017 Harriman-Rothschild Book Prize; 2017 Choice Magazine Outstanding Academic Title Award

Academic background
- Education: University of Pittsburgh BA, MA; University of Toronto PhD
- Thesis: “None of us dared say anything: Mass Killing in a Bosnian Community during World War II and the Postwar Culture of Silence

Academic work
- Institutions: Concordia University
- Main interests: Modern Balkan and East-Central European History; Comparative Nationalism
- Notable works: Violence as a Generative Force: Identity, Nationalism, and Memory in a Balkan Community
- Website: http://www.maxbergholz.com/

Max Bergholz is an American historian of Eastern Europe. He is the James M. Stanford Professor in Genocide and Human Rights Studies at Concordia University in Montreal. He has published two books and numerous research papers, as well as magazine articles on the subject of nationalism, violence and genocide, focusing primarily on the Balkans in the 20th century. He won the 2026 Dan David Prize, the largest history award in the world.

== Early life and education ==
Max Bergholz was born in Pittsburgh, Pennsylvania. He studied modern European history at the University of Pittsburgh, where he completed his B.A. Honors and M.A. degree. He obtained a PhD from the University of Toronto, with doctoral studies in the modern history of the Balkans and Eastern Europe.

== Employment, teaching and research ==
Bergholz currently works as a Professor of history at Concordia University, Montreal. Bergholz teaches on the history of nationalism and violence on the Balkans.

Between 2011 and 2017 Bergholz was Associate Director of the Institute for Genocide and Human Rights Studies at Concordia University and held the History Department Chair Search Committee from 2012 to 2013 and 2015 to 2016, among other administrative positions.

=== Research ===
His research interests in the "microdynamics of nationalism", "mass violence", and "historical memory", focuses on the fieldwork in Bosnia and Herzegovina, Croatia, and Serbia. He conducts research and writes on multi-ethnic communities of Bosnia-Herzegovina, Croatia, and Serbia during the twentieth century, investigating local dynamics of intercommunal peace and discord.

His research has won support, grants and fellowships from organizations such as the Harry Frank Guggenheim Foundation, Fulbright International Institute for Education, International Research and Exchanges Board, Le Fonds de recherché du Québec-Société et culture, American Councils for International Education and the American Council of Learned Societies.

His latest book investigates the causes and dynamics of violence during 1941 in a multi-ethnic community that straddles the present-day border between Bosnia and Croatia, and their effects on local identities and social relations.

He is fluent in Serbo-Croatian local variants, Bosnian, Croatian, Montenegrin, and Serbian languages.

=== Methodology ===
His research methodology revolves around small units analysis and meticulous fieldwork, such as small local archives investigation, interviewing people in small rural communities and villages. In his own words, he describes his research and writings as interdisciplinary, and methodology which employs mixed approaches, with analysis scale and perspective of local and small nature, focusing on life in the rural area.

== Published works ==
Bergholz's research has been published in journals such as The American Historical Review.

In 2016, Cornell University Press, in Ithaca, NY, published his first book, Violence as a Generative Force: Identity, Nationalism, and Memory in a Balkan Community. It was translated to Bosnian and published by Buybook in 2018, under the title Nasilje kao generativna sila: identitet, nacionalizam i sjećanje u jednoj balkanskoj zajednici.

=== Books ===
- Violence as a Generative Force: Identity, Nationalism, and Memory in a Balkan Community, Cornell University Press (2016). ISBN 978-1-50170-643-1

== Awards ==
His first book, Violence as a Generative Force has received five prizes, including the 2019 Laura Shannon Prize, awarded by the Nanovic Institute for European Studies at the University of Notre Dame; the 2018 European Studies Book Award, awarded by the Council for European Studies at Columbia University; the 2017 Herbert Baxter Adams Prize, awarded by the American Historical Association; the 2017 Harriman-Rothschild Prize in Nationalism and Ethnic Studies, awarded by the Association for the Study of Nationalities and the Harriman Institute at Columbia University; and the 2017 Taylor and Francis Book Prize in Slavic, East European, and Eurasian Studies, awarded by the Canadian Association of Slavists; and the 2017 Choice Magazine Outstanding Academic Title Award, by Choice Reviews. He won the Dan David Prize in 2026.

== See also ==
- Genocide studies
