= Adams Prize (disambiguation) =

Adams Prize may refer to:

- Herbert Baxter Adams Prize, of the American Historical Association
- Adams Prize, by the University of Cambridge and St John's College for research in mathematics
- Douglas Adams prize, in honor of Douglas Adams, given by St John's College for humorous writing
