= Harline =

Harline is a surname. Notable people with the surname include:

- Craig Harline, American historian of religion
- Leigh Harline (1907–1969), American film composer and songwriter
