= Preve =

Preve is a surname. Notable people with the surname include:

- Costanzo Preve (1943 – 2013), Italian philosopher and a political theoretician
- Ricardo Preve (born 1957), Argentine filmmaker, photographer, and activist

== See also ==
- Prete
