= Mar Hicks =

American historian

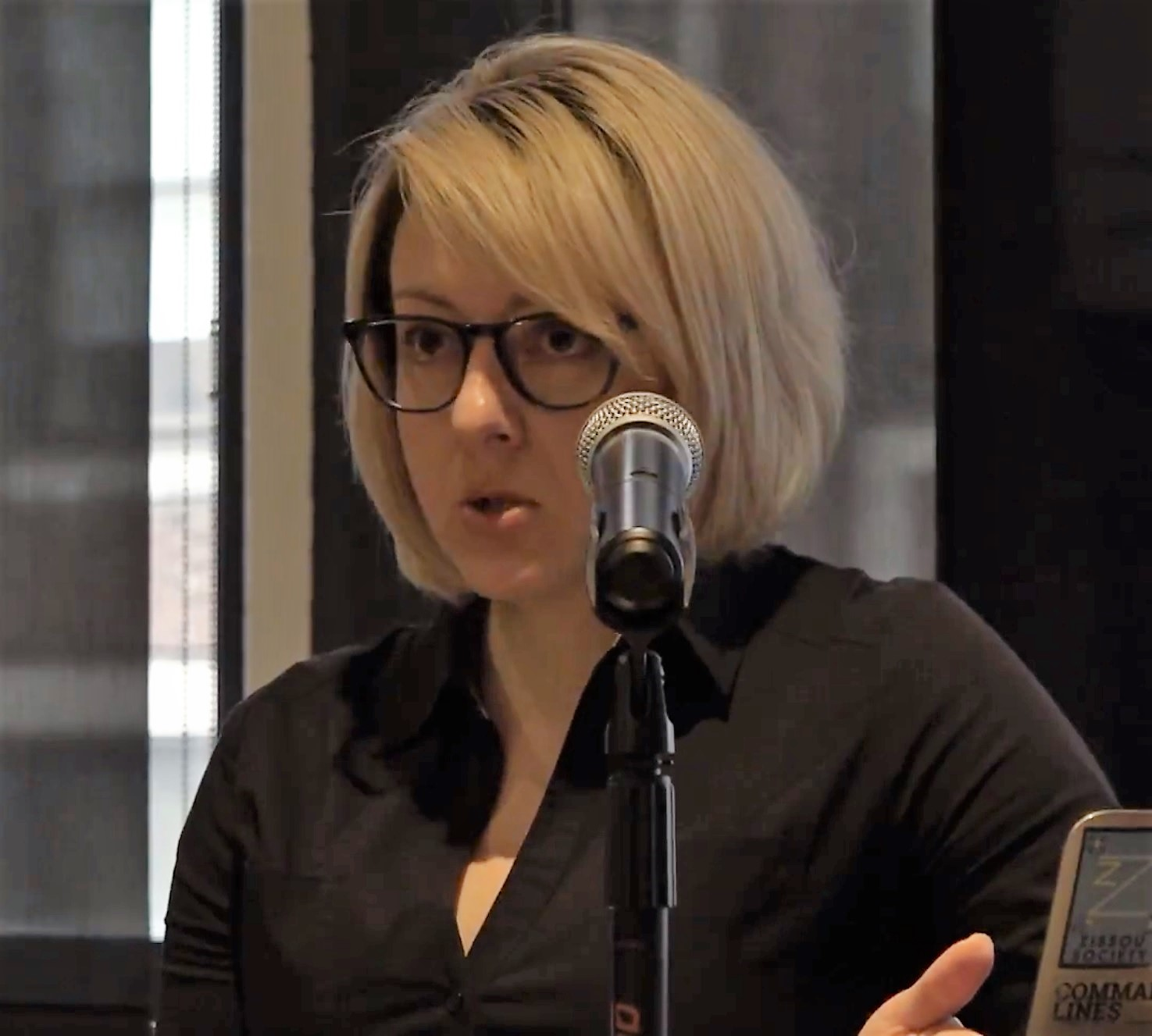
- Hicks in 2017
- Awards: Stansky Prize (2018), Hacker Prize (2018), PROSE Award (2018), Baxter Prize (2019)

Academic background
- Education: Harvard University; Duke University

Academic work
- Institutions: North Carolina State University; Duke University; University of Wisconsin–Madison; Illinois Institute of Technology; University of Virginia

Mar Hicks is a historian of technology, gender and modern Europe, notable for their work on the history of women in computing. Hicks is a professor at the University of Virginia’s School of Data Science. Hicks wrote the 2017 book, Programmed Inequality: How Britain Discarded Women Technologists and Lost Its Edge in Computing.

== Early life and education ==
Hicks received a B.A. in Modern European History from Harvard University with their thesis The Price of Excellence: Coresidence and Women's Integration at Oxford and Harvard Universities, 1964-1977. They studied history at University of Oxford for a year as a visiting student. After receiving a M.A. from the Department of History at Duke University, Hicks earned a Ph.D., also from the Department of History at Duke University.

== Career ==
Prior to earning a Ph.D., Hicks worked at Harvard University as a UNIX system administrator. Hicks has said the position informed their later work on history of technology.

Hicks is currently an associate professor with tenure at the University of Virginia, in the School of Data Science. Hicks was previously a visiting assistant professor at North Carolina State University in Raleigh, North Carolina, a visiting assistant professor at Duke University, in Durham, North Carolina, an associate professor at the Illinois Institute of Technology in Chicago, and an assistant professor of history of technology at the University of Wisconsin–Madison until the closure of that university’s history of science department.

Hicks's work focuses on issues of inequality in high tech, particularly gender discrimination in the computing industry. Their book "Programmed Inequality: How Britain Discarded Women Technologists and Lost Its Edge In Computing" reveals a switch in the 1960s and 1970s, where as computing roles became more powerful, women who dominated computer programming roles were systematically replaced with men.

Hicks is known for drawing from this history when writing about contemporary gender issues in the computing industry. Hicks has also written about the early history of computer dating in the mainframe era, showing that women were at the forefront of creating computer dating businesses, contrary to what was previously thought.

Hicks is an Associate Editor of the IEEE Annals of the History of Computing.

Hicks is non-binary and uses they/them pronouns.

== Selected membership ==
- Society for the History of Technology, Executive Committee

== Selected awards ==
- 2019 IEEE Computer Society Best Paper Award for "Hacking the Cis-Tem: Transgender Citizens and the Early Digital State”
- 2018-2019: National Humanities Center, Triangle Park, North Carolina, Fellow
- 2019: American Historical Association, Herbert Baxter Adams Prize in European History for Programmed Inequality
- 2018: Society for the History of Technology, Hacker Prize for Programmed Inequality
- 2018: North American Conference on British Studies, Stansky Prize for Programmed Inequality
- 2018: Association of American Publishers, PROSE Award for Programmed Inequality
- 2017: British Business Archives Council, Wadsworth Prize for Programmed Inequality

== Selected works and publications ==
=== Works ===
- Hicks, Mar (2017). Programmed Inequality: How Britain Discarded Women Technologists and Lost Its Edge in Computing. Boston: MIT Press. ISBN 978-0-262-53518-2. OCLC 1164502643.
- Mullaney, Thomas S.; Peters, Benjamin; Hicks, Mar; Philip., Kavita, eds. (2021). Your Computer Is on Fire. Cambridge, MA: MIT Press. ISBN 978-0-262-53973-9. OCLC 1226612091.

=== Selected publications ===
- Hicks, Mar (October 2010). "Only the Clothes Changed: Women Operators in British Computing and Advertising, 1950–1970". IEEE Annals of the History of Computing. 32 (4): 5–17. doi:10.1109/MAHC.2010.55. S2CID 44935068.
- Hicks, Mar (March 27, 2013). "Brograms and the Power of Vaporware". CHM Blog. Computer History Museum.
- Hicks, Mar (2016). "Against Meritocracy in the History of Computing" (PDF). CORE: The Magazine of the Computer History Museum. Computer History Museum: 28–33. Archived from the original (PDF) on March 22, 2016.
- Hicks, Mar (Fall 2016). "Computer Love: Replicating Social Order Through Early Computer Dating Systems". Ada: A Journal of Gender, New Media, and Technology (10). doi:10.7264/N3NP22QR. ISSN 2325-0496. Archived from the original on October 22, 2019.
- Hicks, Mar (July 1, 2017). "The Mother of All Swipes". Logic Magazine (2).
- Hicks, Mar (October 2018). "When Winning Is Losing: Why the Nation that Invented the Computer Lost Its Lead". Computer. 51 (10): 48–57. doi:10.1109/MC.2018.3971355. S2CID 53230984.
- Hicks, Mar (January 1, 2019). "Hacking the Cis-Tem: Transgender Citizens and the Early Digital State". IEEE Annals of the History of Computing. 41 (1): 20–33. doi:10.1109/MAHC.2019.2897667. OCLC 1099846368. S2CID 84186961.
