= Isaac Rabinowitz =

Russian-born Jewish poet and translator

- Yitzḥak ben Mordekhai Rabinovitz
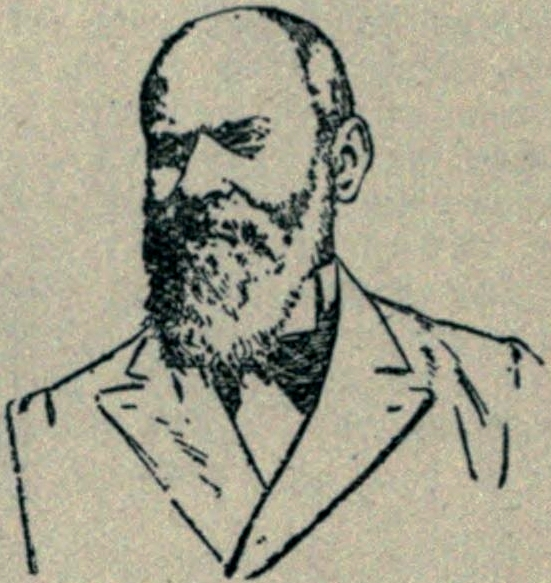
- Born: 13 October 1846; Kovno, Kovno Governorate, Russian Empire
- Died: 9 March 1900 (aged 53); New York City, United States of America
- Writing career
- Pen name: Ish Kovno
- Genre: Poetry

Isaac ben Mordechai Rabinowitz (Yiddish: יצחק בן מרדכי ראַבּינאָוויטש; 13 October 1846 – 9 March 1900), also known by the pen name Ish Kovno (Yiddish: איש קאָוונא) was a Russian-born Jewish poet and translator.

== Biography ==
Born in Kovno to Rabbi Mordechai ben Yosef, Isaac Rabinowitz began to compose Hebrew poetry at an early age. He took instruction in Hebrew grammar from Abraham Mapu when fourteen, and entered the Vilna Rabbinical School at the age of eighteen. Rabinowitz settled in Telshi after marrying in 1867, where he befriended Mordecai Nathansohn and Judah Leib Gordon and wrote occasionally for Hebrew periodicals. He moved to Vilkomir in 1889, and joined his children in New York in 1891.

Rabinowitz published most of his Hebrew poetry in Vilna in 1891 in a book called Zemirot Yisrael. He died in New York at the age of 54 in 1900. Poet Israel Fine published a poem in memory of Rabinowitz in 1907, entitled "Shir Berakhah".
