= The Capital Order =

2022 book by Clara E. Mattei

The Capital Order: How Economists Invented Austerity and Paved the Way to Fascism
- Author: Clara E. Mattei
- Genre: 20th century European history
- Publisher: University of Chicago Press
- Publication date: 2022
- Publication place: United States
- Pages: 452
- ISBN: 9780226818399
- OCLC: 1296686961

The Capital Order: How Economists Invented Austerity and Paved the Way to Fascism is a 2022 book written by Italian political economist Clara Mattei. It explores the history of government and industry efforts to apply austerity programs to protect capitalist economies in Italy and the United Kingdom against social disorder in the 20th century, augmenting the formation of fascism. The book received the 2023 Herbert Baxter Adams Prize for an author’s first book "on European history from 1815 through the 20th century".

== Summary ==
Mattei argues that politicians and business groups used economic measures applied to the capitalist economies of Italy and the United Kingdom following World War I to suppress rising working class power. In both countries, normal laissez-faire policy was replaced with a rapid reliance on government austerity measures in support of a presupposed "certain sociopolitical order, or capital order". Mattei writes that the "social relation of capital – people selling their labor power for a wage – must be uniform across a society" in order for the society to deliver economic growth. The requirements of the capital limits on spending and wages made by austerity are used by those in power to ensure that most people in capitalist societies have no alternative path to survival and act to accept austerity, which merely enhances the survival of capitalism itself against worker ascendancy.

During World War I, working class power grew, as increased government regulations and management of industry were used to support societal coordination toward the greater war effort. Near the end of the war, the Russian Revolution saw worker unrest and anti-war sentiment force the abdication of Nicholas II and eventually the collapse of the 1917 Russian Republic and the advent of Bolshevik control. Mattei describes how workers around the Clydeside region of Britain and the northern Italian city Turin, central areas of metallurgical industries, were included in wartime decisions and believed they could demand more power after the war. Fearing actions inspired by the situation in Russia, both the Italian and British governments initially brutally repressed strikes and jailed labor leaders, however these measures were only temporarily effective. Worker power was established through collectivism, with the Clyde Workers Committee and Italian factory committees gaining influence after the war. Both the British Ministry of Reconstruction and Italian Ministry of Labour and Social Welfare briefly supported workers in their efforts to gain power previously held by industry. Mattei describes the period of 1919–1920 as "marked by vast mobilizations toward an alternative socioeconomic system which entailed the overcoming of private ownership of the means of production and wages themselves."

Austerity was brought on after workers began to occupy factories, which greatly alarmed powerful forces interested in maintaining their vision of a "top-down" economy. The book explains how workers had successfully breached the divide between economics and politics, a divide which austerity was used in the following decades to recreate. The initial rise of fascism served one part of a twofold strategy of "coercion and consensus" in worried reaction to the sudden reduction of capitalist power. By adoption of a policy of "work more, consume less", and technocratic elites applying circular logic to austerity policy initiatives in three forms – fiscal, monetary, and industrial – businesses were able to reduce democratic worker power. As Mattei explains, depoliticization of economics with the "fixation of the experts on balanced budgets and on curbing inflation had a deeper goal: reconfiguring of the indisputability of capitalist relations of production, based (as we know) on the pillars of private property and wage relations."

Mattei finds and reports evidence of Bank of England awareness of the results of austerity policy, which was to in effect "normalize" sacrifice on the part of workers. Mattei cites the work of Ralph George Hawtrey at the Genoa Conference of 1922 as cementing monetary management toward these ends among central banks of nations as the fundamental policy of industrial economies.

The ties between fascism and austerity are illustrated in the book through following the push for austerity urged by four Italian economists. Two of the economists, Alberto de' Stefani and Maffeo Pantaleoni, supported fascism and two, Umberto Ricci and Luigi Einaudi, were from the liberal tradition. All four men found common ground in seeing austerity as the best functioning method to preserve the dominance of capitalists in the face of high resistance to loss of influence by trade unions, which in the two years following World War I had made strong gains. Mattei shows further the ties between austerity and authoritarianism by repeating comments of support for Benito Mussolini and Italian austerity from the British establishment during the 1920s. She cites UK Ambassador to Italy Ronald William Graham praising austerity measures under fascism. The Times, The Economist, the governor of the Bank of England, the chairman of the British Italian Banking Corporation, Beaumont Pease, are all shown supporting Mussolini as being necessary to repair Italy, including The Times and The Economist showing tolerance for the murder of Giacomo Matteotti if it meant protecting economic results.

Mattei concludes by showing through statistics and charts how austerity first championed in Britain and enforced in Italy restored "optimal conditions for capital accumulation". She recalls the rise of the influence of central banks, and the European Central Bank, as institutions insulated from electoral politics and designed to preserve the capital order through austerity. Pointing to the 1973 Chilean coup d'état, and its ties to the Chicago school of economics, Mattei warns the "mingling of authoritarianism, economic expertise, and austerity is a recurring trend in modern history".

== Reception ==
Critical reception for The Capital Order has lauded Mattei's thorough collection of evidence and economic history of the interwar period. Writing a review in the socialist publication Catalyst, Gary Mongiovi notes "(s)he has done an impressive amount of archival research and has skillfully mined the published literature of the interwar period. The fruit of these labors is a rich and insightful account of a pivotal moment in capitalism’s history." However, Quinn Slobodian in The American Historical Review cautions that with Mattei's finding of a broad conspiracy among economists, regulators, and business leaders to perpetuate austerity, "the documentary evidence is not always consistent with the claim". Slobodian further points out "the contention that the book has described 'austerity in its modern form' is complicated empirically by the fact that the modern form of austerity does not rely on the gold standard as it did in the 1920s".

In a comprehensive and lengthy review and discussion of the book in Political Science Quarterly, Professor Nicholas Toloudis of The College of New Jersey highlights the thought-provoking nature of Mattei's research and writing: "If Mattei's understanding of austerity is correct, then it bears crucially on our understanding of how democracies are sustained and undermined. Austerity intensifies competition for jobs and consumption power among people least equipped to live healthy lives if they lose out. Insofar as alternatives to the institutional and policy status quo appear infeasible, the policy space shrinks, and the capacity of elections, no matter how competitive, to produce substantially different policy regimes shrinks along with it. We ought to accept these developments not as causes of de-democratization but as manifestations of it."

Modern economists Thomas Piketty and James K. Galbraith provided jacket blurbs for the book, with Piketty praising The Capital Order as "historical political economy at its best". Martin Wolf of the Financial Times included the book in his list of "Best books of 2022: Economics".

== Sources ==
Mattei, Clara E. (2022). The Capital Order : How Economists Invented Austerity and Paved the Way to Fascism. Chicago, IL: The University of Chicago Press. doi:10.7208/chicago/9780226818405.001.0001. ISBN 978 0 226 81839 9.
