= Peter Jelavich =

American author and professor (born 1954)

- Born: 1954 (age 71–72)
- Education: Princeton University (PhD)
- Occupations: author, professor
- Known for: cultural and intellectual history of Europe since the Age of Enlightenment
- Notable work: Professor of History at the Johns Hopkins University
- Parents: Charles Jelavich (father); Barbara Jelavich (mother)

Peter Jelavich (born 1954) is an author and Professor of History at the Johns Hopkins University. He is the son of historians Barbara and Charles Jelavich. Previously, Jelavich was professor of history and chair of the Department of Germanic Studies at the University of Texas at Austin. He was a Junior Fellow in the Harvard Society of Fellows (1979–1981) and he received his PhD from Princeton University in 1982. Jelavich specializes in the cultural and intellectual history of Europe since the Enlightenment, with emphasis on Germany. His areas of interest include the interaction of elite and popular culture; the history of mass culture and the media; and the application of cultural and social theories to historical study. Jelavich served previously as President of the Friends of the German Historical Institute until his term ended in 2019; as of 2020, Kenneth Ledford is the President of the Friends of the GHI. He is the author of Munich and Theatrical Modernism: Politics, Playwriting, and Performance, 1890-1914 (1985), Berlin Cabaret (1993), Berlin Alexanderplatz: Radio, Film, and the Death of Weimar Culture (2006). He was the 1987 recipient of the Herbert Baxter Adams Prize and is a 2013 recipient of the Alexander von Humboldt Research Award.

== Books ==
- Berlin Alexanderplatz: Radio, Film, and the Death of Weimar Culture. Berkeley: University of California Press, 2006.
- Berlin Cabaret. Cambridge: Harvard University Press, 1993 (paperbound edition, 1996).
- Munich and Theatrical Modernism: Politics, Playwriting, and Performance, 1890-1914. Cambridge: Harvard University Press, 1985 (paperbound edition, 1996
- German Expressionism: The Graphic Impulse. (contributor) The Museum of Modern Art, New York, 2011.
- Kunstfreiheit. Eine deutsche Ideologie. Vom Naturalismus bis zur documenta fifteen. Frankfurt am Main: Vittorio Klostermann, 2025.
