= Arthur McCandless Wilson =

Arthur McCandless Wilson (29 July 1902, Sherrard, Illinois – 13 June 1979, Hanover, New Hampshire) was a professor of biography and government. He is known primarily for his two-volume biography of Diderot.

== Career ==
Wilson graduated in 1922 with A.B. from South Dakota's Yankton College. He graduated from the University of Oxford in 1926 with B.A., in 1927 with B. Litt., and in 1931 with M.A. (as a Rhodes Scholar at Exeter College, Oxford). He married Julia Mary Tolford in 1927. At Harvard University he graduated with M.A. in 1930 and Ph.D. in 1933. In Dartmouth College's department of biography, he was appointed in 1933 instructor, in 1936 assistant professor, and in 1940 full professor, retiring in 1967 as professor emeritus. During WWW II he served in Washington, DC, with the Office of Strategic Services.

== Later life ==
After his retirement in 1967, Wilson was a visiting professor at Columbia University for two years from 1967 to 1969. Upon his death he was survived by his widow. His remains were buried at Hillside Cemetery in Norwich, Vermont, the small town where he lived in retirement.

== Works ==
Wilson's book French Foreign Policy during the Administration of Cardinal Fleury, 1726–1743: A Study in Diplomacy and Commercial Development, published in 1936 by Harvard University Press, was awarded in 1938 the Herbert Baxter Adams Prize of the American Historical Association.

Wilson's research on his noted biography of Diderot began in 1936 and received support from Guggenheim fellowships for the academic years 1939–1940 and 1956–1957. His wife helped him with the research, which caused them to travel to France, England, and Russia. Wilson's Diderot: The Testing Years, 1713–1759 was published in 1957 by Oxford University Press. In 1972 two volumes were published as Diderot: The Testing Years, 1713–1759 and Diderot: The Appeal to Posterity, 1759–1784. The two-volume biography won the National Book Award for Nonfiction in 1973. The two-volume biography was translated into French as Diderot. Sa vie et son œuvre, published in 1985 by Laffont/Ramsay.
