= James S. Donnelly Jr. =

British and Irish historian

James S. Donnelly Jr. (born 1943) is emeritus professor of history at the University of Wisconsin–Madison, where he specialised in 19th-century Irish history. He is a leading figure in the field of Irish studies in North America. Donnelly is a former president of the American Conference for Irish Studies, and a current co-editor of the journal Éire-Ireland. He earned degrees from Fordham University and Harvard University.

His research on the Irish Potato Famine made him a well-known historian in the debate on whether the famine was genocide or not.

He has cooperated with Dr. Andy Bielenberg of University College Cork in compiling a digital profile of casualties in Cork during the Irish War of Independence.

== Publications ==
- Captain Rock: The Irish Agrarian Rebellion of 1821-1824. (2009).
- Encyclopedia of Irish History and Culture. (2004), editor.
- The Great Irish Potato Famine. (2001).
- Irish Popular Culture 1650-1850. (1999), co-edited with Kerby A. Miller.
- Irish Peasants: Violence & Political Unrest, 1780-1914. (1983), co-edited with Samuel Clark.
- The Land and the People of Nineteenth-Century Cork: The Rural Economy and Land Question. 1975 (which was awarded the Herbert Baxter Adams Prize of the American Historical Association)
- Landlord and Tenant in Nineteenth-Century Ireland. (1973).
