= Clara Mattei =

Italian economist and academic

Clara Elisabetta Mattei (born 1988) is an Italian-American political economist and academic, specializing in the history of capitalism and the interplay between economic theories and technocratic policymaking. Since February 2025, she has served as a professor of economics and as the founding president of the Forum for Real Economic Emancipation at the University of Tulsa, Oklahoma, United States.

== Early life and education ==
Born in the United States to Italian parents, Clara Mattei is the grandniece of communist Italian resistance fighters Gianfranco and Teresa Mattei.

Mattei earned her Bachelor of Arts and Master of Arts degrees in philosophy from the University of Pavia. She completed a joint Ph.D. in economics at the Sant'Anna School of Advanced Studies in Pisa and the Université de Strasbourg's École Doctorale Augustine Cournot.

== Career ==
Prior to her appointment at the University of Tulsa, Mattei was an associate professor in the economics department at The New School for Social Research in New York City. During the 2018-2019 academic year, she was a member of the School of Social Sciences at the Institute for Advanced Study in Princeton.

=== Publications ===
In November 2022, Mattei published her first book, The Capital Order: How Economists Invented Austerity and Paved the Way to Fascism, through the University of Chicago Press. The work investigates the origins of austerity policies following World War I and their role as a reaction against alternatives to capitalism. The book was recognized by the Financial Times as one of the ten best economics books of 2022, has been translated into over ten languages, and received the 2023 Herbert Baxter Adams Prize from the American Historical Association.

In November 2023, Mattei released her first book written in Italian, L’economia è politica: Tutto quello che non vediamo dell’economia e che nessuno racconta, published by Fuoriscena Libri. The book was released in English by Simon & Schuster under the title Escape from Capitalism: An Intervention in 2026.

Her scholarly articles have appeared in journals such as the Cambridge Journal of Economics, the Journal of the History of Economic Thought, and the European Journal of the History of Economic Thought. She has contributed to media outlets including The Guardian, Jacobin, and Il Fatto Quotidiano.

=== Research interests ===
Mattei's research examines post-World War I monetary and fiscal policies and the history of economic thought. Her current project critically reassesses the Golden Age of Capitalism (1945-1975) and its Keynesianism, through the lens of austerity capitalism.

=== Awards and honors ===
- Young Scholar Award from the History of Economics Society (June 2015) for her paper "The Guardians of Capitalism. International Consensus and Fascist Technocratic Implementation of Austerity"
- Young Scholar Award from the European Society for the History of Economic Thought (May 2015) for her paper "Austerity and Repressive Politics: Italian Economists in the Early Years of the Fascist Government 1922-1925".

== Selected works and publications ==
=== Books ===
- The Capital Order: How Economists Invented Austerity and Paved the Way to Fascism, University of Chicago Press (2022). ISBN 978-0226818399
- L’Economia è Politica, Fuoriscena Libri (2023). ISBN 979-12-225-0000-3
- Escape from Capitalism: An Intervention, Simon & Schuster (2026). ISBN 978-1668085141

=== Book chapters ===
- —— (2022). "Capitalism Contested: Britain in the Aftermath of World War I". In Fassin, Didier; Honneth, Axel (eds.). Crisis Under Critique: How People Assess, Transform, and Respond to Critical Situations. Columbia University Press. doi:10.7312/fass20432-003.
- —— (2019). "Early Women Economists at Columbia University: Contributions in the Struggle for Labor Protection in the Lochner Era". In Madden, Kirsten; Dimand, Robert W. (eds.). The Routledge Handbook of the History of Women's Economic Thought. Routledge. doi:10.4324/9781315723570-15.
- ——; Cuppini, Niccoló (2019). "Per una Nuova Politica Transnazionale". In Biale, Enrico; Fumagalli, Corrado (eds.). Per cosa lottare: Le frontiere del progressismo. Fondazione Feltrinelli.
