= Pieter Judson =

American historian

Pieter M. Judson
- Awards: Herbert Baxter Adams Prize (1997); Guggenheim Fellowship (2010); Nina Maria Gorrissen Berlin Prize (2011); Fellow of the American Academy of Arts and Sciences (2025)

Academic background
- Education: Columbia University (MA, PhD); Swarthmore College (BA)
- Doctoral advisor: István Deák

Academic work
- Discipline: History
- Sub-discipline: Central European history, Habsburg monarchy, Nationalism
- Institutions: European University Institute; Swarthmore College; Pitzer College
- Notable works: Exclusive Revolutionaries (1996); Guardians of the Nation (2006); The Habsburg Empire: A New History (2016)

Pieter M. Judson (born 1956, Utrecht) is an American historian specializing in the history of Central Europe, the Habsburg monarchy, and modern nationalism. He has held academic appointments in the United States and Europe, including a Chair in 19th and 20th Century History at the European University Institute (EUI) in Florence.

== Education ==
Judson earned his Bachelor of Arts from Swarthmore College in 1978. He continued his studies at Columbia University, where he received his Master of Arts in 1981 and his PhD in 1987 under the supervision of István Deák.

== Academic career ==
Judson began his academic career as Assistant Professor of History at Pitzer College, where he taught from 1988 to 1992. In 1993 he joined Swarthmore College as Assistant Professor of History. He was promoted to Associate Professor with tenure in 1996 and to Full Professor in 2004. During his tenure at Swarthmore, he served as Head of the History Department from 2001 to 2006 and held the Isaac H. Clothier Professorship of History and International Relations from 2011 to 2013.

Starting in 1994, Judson introduced a course on Sexuality and Gender in Modern Europe as part of the History curriculum.

In 2014, Judson was appointed Chair in 19th and 20th Century History at the European University Institute in Florence. He served as Head of the Department of History and Civilization from 2015 to 2018. After completing his term as chair, he continued at the Institute as Part-time Professor of History (2024–2025) and Senior Fellow in the Department of History (2025–2026).

== Research work ==
Judson’s research focuses on the political, social, and cultural history of Central Europe in the nineteenth and early twentieth centuries, with particular emphasis on the Habsburg monarchy, nationalism, liberalism, imperial governance, and borderlands. His work examines how national identities were constructed, negotiated, and contested within imperial institutions and everyday social practices.

A central theme of his scholarship is the reinterpretation of the Habsburg Empire as a functioning and adaptive imperial polity rather than a failed “prison of peoples.” In collaboration with former students and co-authors, Judson contributed to the development of the concept of “national indifference,” a framework used by historians to analyze populations whose political loyalties and cultural practices did not conform to rigid national categories. His publications on the Habsburg Empire and Central Europe have appeared in numerous languages, and his book The Habsburg Empire: A New History has been translated into multiple European and Asian languages. Judson has served as editor of the Austrian History Yearbook (2006–2011; 2011–2016).

== Awards and honors ==
- Fulbright Fellowships for research in Austria (1982–1984; 1996–1997)
- Summer Research Fellowship, National Endowment for the Humanities (1991)
- Herbert Baxter Adams Prize, American Historical Association, for Exclusive Revolutionaries (1997)
- Senior Fellow, Internationales Forschungszentrum Kulturwissenschaften (International Research Center for Cultural Studies), Vienna (2000)
- Barbara Jelavich Prize, American Association for the Advancement of Slavic Studies, for Guardians of the Nation (2007)
- Fellowship, National Endowment for the Humanities (2010–2011)
- Karl von Vogelsang State Prize (Austrian Government) for Guardians of the Nation (2010)
- Guggenheim Fellowship (2010)
- Nina Maria Gorrissen Berlin Prize, American Academy in Berlin (2011)
- Election to the American Academy of Arts and Sciences (2025)

== Publications ==
- Exclusive Revolutionaries: Liberal Politics, Social Experience, and National Identity in the Austrian Empire 1848–1914 (1996, winner of the Herbert Baxter Adams prize of the American Historical Association and the Austrian Cultural Institute's Prize for best book both of 1997)
- Wien brennt! Die Revolution von 1848 und ihr liberales Erbe. Translated from the English by Norbert Schürer (Vienna: Böhlau Verlag, 1998)
- The Gendered Politics of German Nationalism in 19th-Century Austria,” in David Good, Margarethe Grandner, and Mary Jo Maynes (eds.), Austrian Women in the 19th and 20th Centuries (New York: Berghahn Books, 2000), pp. 1–17.
- Constructing Nationalities in East Central Europe, edited with Marsha Rozenblit (New York: Berghahn Books, 2004)
- Guardians of the Nation: Activists on the Language Frontiers of Imperial Austria (Cambridge, MA: Harvard University Press, 2006)
- “Nationalism in the Era of the Nation State,” in Helmut W. Smith, ed., The Oxford Handbook of Modern German History, Oxford University Press, 2011.
- “Nationalism and Indifference,” in Habsburg Neu Denken. Vielfalt und Ambivalenz in Zentraleuropa. 30 Kulturwissenschatliche Stichworte. Vienna: Böhlau, 2016.
- The Habsburg Empire: A New History (Cambridge, MA: Belknap Press of Harvard University Press, 2016). An audiobook edition, narrated by Michael Page, was released in 2017. ISBN 9780674047761
- The Great War and the Transformation of Habsburg Central Europe, with Tara Zahra (Oxford: Oxford University Press, 2025)
