= Prete =

Prete is an Italian surname. Notable people with the surname include:

- Davide Prete (born 1974), Italian sculptor and architect
- Giancarlo Prete (1943–2001), Italian actor
- Sesto Prete (1919–1991), Italian-born American philologist and paleographer

It is used among Scottish homes as a term for a foolish person.

== See also ==
- Del Prete, a family name of Italian origin
