= Barbara Jelavich =

American historian (1923 – 1995)

- Born: Barbara Brightfield; April 12, 1923; Belleville, Illinois, US
- Died: January 14, 1995 (aged 71)
- Occupations: historian and author
- Spouse: Charles Jelavich
- Children: 2
- Relatives: Peter Jelavich (son)

Academic background
- Education: University of California; A.B., M.A., Ph.D.

Barbara Jelavich (April 12, 1923 – January 14, 1995) was an American historian and writer. A prominent scholar in the field of Eastern European history, she specifically focused on the diplomatic histories of the Russian and Habsburg monarchies, the diplomacy of the Ottoman Empire, and the history of the Balkans.

She began her academic career as a junior research historian at UC Berkeley Institute of Slavic Studies after obtaining three history degrees from the University of California at Berkeley. In 1961, she joined the faculty at Indiana University as a lecturer before becoming a full professor in the history department in 1967. Her tenure at Indiana University continued until her retirement in 1993, she received the title of Distinguished Professor Emeritus of History in recognition of her exceptional scholarly achievement.

She made substantial contributions to scholarly literature, co-authoring or authoring 17 books that delved into the histories of Russia, the Balkans, and the Ottoman and Habsburg empires. Collaborating with her husband, Charles, who was also a history professor emeritus at Indiana, several of her works were co-authored. Her areas of expertise encompassed Albania, Bulgaria, Turkey, and Yugoslavia.

== Biography ==
Barbara Brightfield was born in Belleville, Illinois, April 12, 1923. She earned three degrees in history from the University of California at Berkeley: an A.B. honors degree in 1943, an M.A. in 1944, and a Ph.D. in 1948. In 1944, she married Croatian-American Charles Jelavich (1922–2013), one of America's foremost Balkan, Habsburg, and South Slavic specialists; both engaged in multiple academic collaborations. They were jointly honored in 1992 with the AAASS Award for Distinguished Contributions to Slavic Studies.

After briefly teaching at Berkeley College and Mills College, Jelavich dedicated her time towards raising her two sons (Mark and Peter) while conducting further research in Balkan history and diplomatic history. In 1961, she and her husband went to the Department of History at Indiana University. In 1967, she was promoted to professor in the Department of History and in 1984 was named Distinguished Professor of History. She served as chairman of the Conference on Slavic and East European History in 1979 and also served as president of the Society for Romanian Studies from 1988 to 1990. When she and her husband retired in 1992, she was elected as an honorary member of the Romanian Academy. During that same year, she was given the first Lifetime Achievement Award by the Association for Women in Slavic Studies.

Jelavich's works were concentrated on the diplomatic histories of the Russian and Habsburg monarchies, the diplomacy of the Ottoman Empire, and the history of the Balkans (including nations such as Romania and Greece). Her most impressive accomplishment was the publication of the History of the Balkans in 1983. She intended to update this particular work in order to accommodate the major events that occurred in the Balkans in 1989. Her book Modern Austria appeared in 1994 in a Japanese edition, and she collaborated on the third edition of the American Historical Association's Guide to Historical Literature (published in 1995). She also wrote a piece on the international position of Romania in 1848 that reflected the standpoints of the Habsburgs, Ottomans, Russians, and southeastern Europeans. Romanian historian Cornelia Bodea acknowledged Jelavich as an internationally "respected ruler in her territorial waters".

In 1994, Jelavich was received into the Roman Catholic Church. On January 14, 1995, she died in Bloomington Hospital (Bloomington, Indiana) after a long struggle with cancer. She was buried in the Mission Cemetery in Santa Clara, California. In 1995 the Barbara Jelavich Prize was established under the auspices of the AAASS, in recognition of scholarship in 19th and 20th century southeastern European and Habsburg studies, as well as in Russian and Ottoman diplomatic history.

== Published works ==
Selection as author:

- Jelavich, Barbara (1959). "Russia and the Rumanian National Cause, 1821—1878". International Journal of Middle East Studies. 18 (1). Indiana University Press: 104–106. doi:10.1017/S0020743800030385. S2CID 162338522.
- Jelavich, Barbara (1961). Russia, Bavaria and the Greek Revolution of 1862—1863. Thessaloniki: Institute of Balkan Studies.
- Jelavich, Barbara (1962). "Russia and Greece during the Regency of King Othon, 1832—1835. Russian Documents on the First Years of Greek Independence". Slavic Review. 22 (3). Thessaloniki: Institute of Balkan Studies: 557–558. doi:10.2307/2492508. JSTOR 2492508. S2CID 163727157.
- Jelavich, Barbara (1964). A Century of Russian Foreign Policy: 1814—1914. New York: J. B. Lippincott & Co.
- Jelavich, Barbara (1966). The Philorthodox conspiracy of 1839: a report to Metternich. Thessaloniki: Institute of Balkan Studies.
- Jelavich, Barbara (1969). The Habsburg Empire in European affairs, 1814—1918. Chicago: Rand McNally.
- Jelavich, Barbara (1973). Russia, Britain and the Bulgarian question 1885—1888. Sudost-Forschungen.
- Jelavich, Barbara (1973). The Ottoman Empire, the great powers, and the straits question, 1870—1887. Indiana University Press. ISBN 9780253342768.
- Jelavich, Barbara (1974). St. Petersburg and Moscow: Tsarist and Soviet Foreign Policy, 1814—1974. Indiana University Press. ISBN 9780253350503.
- Jelavich, Barbara (1983). History of the Balkans: Eighteenth and Nineteenth Centuries. Vol. 1. Cambridge University Press. ISBN 9780521252492.
- Jelavich, Barbara (1983). History of the Balkans: Twentieth Century. Vol. 2. Cambridge University Press. ISBN 9780521274593.
- Jelavich, Barbara (1984). "Russia and the Formation of the Romanian State". International Journal of Middle East Studies. 18 (1). Cambridge University Press: 104–106. doi:10.1017/S0020743800030385. S2CID 162338522.
- Jelavich, Barbara (1987). Modern Austria: Empire and Republic, 1815—1986. Cambridge University Press. ISBN 9780521316255.
- Jelavich, Barbara (1991). Russia's Balkan Entanglements, 1806—1914. Cambridge University Press. ISBN 9780521522502.

As co-author:

- Jelavich, Charles and Barbara (1963). The Balkans in transition: essays on the development of Balkan life and politics since the eighteenth century. Berkeley: University of California Press.
- Jelavich, Charles and Barbara (1965). The Balkans. N.J., Prentice-Hall: Englewood Cliffs. ISBN 978-0-13-055343-0.
- Jelavich, Charles and Barbara (1977). The Establishment of the Balkan National States, 1804-1920. University of Washington Press. ISBN 9780295954448.

== Sources ==
- Michelson, Paul E. (1995). "Barbara Jelavich: 1923-1995". Slavic Review. 54 (1): 258–259. doi:10.1017/S0037677900070765.
- Kenney, Palaic; Miller, Ilana (2013). "In Memoriam: Charles Jelavich" (PDF). REEIfication: News from Indiana University's Russian and East European Institute. 37 (2): 1–16.
