= Ethan H. Shagan =

American historian

Ethan H. Shagan (born November 16, 1971) is an American historian of early modern Britain. Shagan is a professor of history at the University of California, Berkeley. He is also the chair of the History Department. He received his undergraduate degree from Brown University and his master's degree and PhD from Princeton University (co-supervised by Diarmaid MacCulloch). He was formerly a junior fellow of the Harvard Society of Fellows, and Wayne V. Jones Research Professor in History at Northwestern University, where he received the E. LeRoy Hall Award for Distinguished Teaching. He is the recipient of a number of awards, including the Herbert Baxter Adams Prize and Morris D. Forkosch Prize from the American Historical Association, the Roland H. Bainton Prize from Sixteenth Century Society and Conference, and the Whitfield Prize of the Royal Historical Society.

In 2013 he went on record with UC Berkeley's newspaper, disagreeing with the results of a Northwestern University study suggesting that adjunct, or non-permanent faculty, are more effective instructors than permanent, tenured or tenure-track faculty, claiming that “(Studies like these) assume a sort of dumbed-down model of the university, where we are glorified high school teachers whose goal is to better teach students rote memorization ... that they can parrot back on an exam ... The goal is to teach students to think for themselves, and that’s not something adjuncts can necessarily do as well.”

== Further information ==
- Ethan H. Shagan, Associate Professor of History Faculty Profile
- Letter from the Director Ethan Shagan Center for British Studies at Berkeley
- Books by Ethan H. Shagan at Amazon.com
- Weddings; Sarah Paul, Ethan Shagan New York Times Wedding Announcement
