= Suzanne Desan =

American historian (born 1957)

Suzanne M. Desan
- Born: 1957 (age 67–68)
- Education: Princeton University; University of California, Berkeley (PhD)
- Occupation: Historian
- Employer: University of Wisconsin–Madison

Suzanne M. Desan (born 1957) is an American historian. She is the Vilas-Shinner Professor of History at the University of Wisconsin–Madison, and the author or editor of four books on French history.

== Early life ==
Suzanne Desan graduated from Princeton University. She earned a PhD from the University of California, Berkeley. Her sister is Christine Desan, Leo Gottlieb Professor of Law at the Harvard Law School (also a graduate of Princeton).

== Career ==
Desan teaches at the University of Wisconsin-Madison, where she is the Vilas-Shinner Professor of History. She is the author of two books and the editor of two more books on French history, especially the role of women in the French Revolution. She is also the author of a series of lectures produced by The Great Courses, entitled "Living the French Revolution and the Age of Napoleon".

Desan won the Herbert Baxter Adams Prize from the American Historical Association in 1992, and she was awarded a Guggenheim Fellowship in 1998.

== Works ==
- Dusan, Suzanne (1990). Reclaiming the Sacred: Lay Religion and Popular Politics in Revolutionary France. Ithaca, NY: Cornell University Press. OCLC 657399411.
- Desan, Suzanne (2004). The Family on Trial in Revolutionary France. Oakland: University of California Press. ISBN 978-0520939769. OCLC 940727096.
- Dusan, Suzanne; Merrick, Jeffrey W., eds. (2009). Family, Gender, and Law in Early Modern France. University Park: Pennsylvania State University Press. ISBN 978-0271034690. OCLC 799709564.
- Desan, Suzanne; Hunt, Lynn; Nelson, William Max, eds. (2013). The French Revolution in Global Perspective. Ithaca, NY: Cornell University Press. ISBN 978-0801478680. OCLC 893491397.
