= John P. McKay =

American historian and author (1938–2022)

- Born: August 27, 1938 St. Louis, Missouri.
- Died: November 24, 2022 (aged 84) Urbana, Illinois.
- Education: Wesleyan University; University of California, Berkeley; Fletcher School of Law and Diplomacy
- Occupations: Professor; Author
- Writing career
- Period: 1968-2020
- Subject: History

John Patrick McKay (August 27, 1938 - November 24, 2022) was an author and professor of history. McKay was born in St. Louis, Missouri, Graduated from Webster Groves High School in 1956, then earned his B.A. from Wesleyan University in 1961, and his Ph.D. from the University of California, Berkeley in 1968. He became a professor of history at the University of Illinois in 1976, where he held the position of Professor Emeritus of history. McKay specialized in modern French history, and nineteenth-century European economic and social history. McKay died on November 24, 2022, in Champaign, Illinois.

In 1970 McKay won the Herbert Baxter Adams Prize for his book Pioneers for Profit: Foreign Entrepreneurship and Russian Industrialization, 1885-1913 (1970). He has translated Jules Michelet's The People (1973) and has written Tramways and Trolleys: The Rise of Urban Mass Transport in Europe (1976), as well as more than a hundred articles, book chapters and reviews. He contributed to Imagining the Twentieth Century (1997), edited by Charles C. Stewart and Peter Fritzsche, as well as Europe, 1789-1914 (2006), edited by John Merriman and Jay Winters.

Among other publications, McKay has written the textbooks A History of World Societies and A History of Western Society, both published in several editions. A History of Western Society is often used in Advanced Placement European History classes.
