= Del Prete =

Del Prete is a family name of Italian origin. It may refer to:

- Carlo Del Prete (1897–1928), a pioneer aviator from Italy
- Deborah Del Prete (b. ? ), an American producer
- Duilio Del Prete (1938–1998), an Italian actor, dubber and singer-songwriter
- Lorenzo Del Prete (born 1986), an Italian football player
- Miki Del Prete (born 1986), an Italian lyricist and record producer
- Sandro del Prete (born 1937), a Swiss artist

== See also ==
- Prete
