= Arthur May =

American historian and academic (died 1968)

Arthur James May (c. 1899 – June 13, 1968) was an American historian, a professor, and "an authority on the history of modern Europe."

May was born in Rockdale, Pennsylvania. He received a Bachelor's Degree from Wesleyan University and a Master's and Doctorate from the University of Pennsylvania. "He taught at the University of Pennsylvania and Brown University" before he came to the University of Rochester in 1925.

He was a prolific speaker, frequently lecturing in the United States and Europe on "historical and contemporary issues." He was the author of a number of works of history, particularly the history of Eastern Europe. His book The Hapsburg monarchy, 1867-1914 won The Herbert Baxter Adams Prize of the American Historical Association in 1952. He was named one of "three distinguished pioneer American scholars of Hapsburg history." His last book A History of the University of Rochester, 1850-1962 was published posthumously.

May was a member of the American Historical Association, the American Association of University Professors, and the International Committee for the Study of the Hapsburg Monarchy, and an honorary member of Phi Beta Kappa.

May retired from teaching in 1964 and became the University Historian at Rochester.

== Publications ==
- May, Arthur J. (1925). Kossuth and Karolyi. OCLC 24333371.
- May, Arthur J. (1933). The age of Metternich, 1814-1848. H. Holt. OCLC 164719597.
- May, Arthur J. (1938). The Novibazar Railway Project.
- May, Arthur J. (1947) Europe and Two World Wars
- May, Arthur J. (1951). The Hapsburg monarchy, 1867-1914. Harvard University Press. OCLC 530556143.
- May, Arthur J. (1956). A history of civilization : the story of our heritage. Charles Scribner's Sons. OCLC 45950248.
- May, Arthur J. (1966). The Passing of the Hapsburg Monarchy, 1914-1918, vol 1. Philadelphia, PA: University of Pennsylvania Press. ISBN 9781512804263. Archived from the original on January 14, 2016.
- May, Arthur J. (1966). The Passing of the Hapsburg Monarchy, 1914-1918, vol 2. Philadelphia, PA: University of Pennsylvania Press. ISBN 9781512807530. Archived from the original on January 14, 2016.
- May, Arthur J. (1966). Vienna in the Age of Franz Josef. University of Oklahoma Press.
- May, Arthur J. (1966). Europe since 1939. Holt, Rinehart and Winston. OCLC 465812263.
- May, Arthur J. (1977). Klein, Lawrence Eliot (ed.). A History of the University of Rochester, 1850-1962. University of Rochester. OCLC 3326047.
