= Marcus Nathanson =

Russian scholar

- Born: 1793; Vilna, Vilnius Voivodeship, Polish–Lithuanian Commonwealth
- Died: 10 June 1868 (aged 74–75); Telsh, Kovno Governorate, Russian Empire

Marcus Nathanson (Yiddish: מרדכי נאטאנזאהן, romanized: Mordekhai Natanzohn; 1793 – 10 June 1868) was a Russian Jewish scholar. He devoted himself to the study of ancient Hebrew literature, publishing the following works: Kontres ayyelet ha-shaḥar, critical notes on certain chapters of the Midrash Tehillim (printed in Pirḥe tzafon, ii. 165–180); Mikhtav 'al devar shemot anashim, on Jewish proper names (ib. pp. 181–186); and a study on the Karaites (in Günzburg's Devir, Vilna, 1864).
