= Paul Slud =

American ornithologist & tropical ecologist (1918-2006)

Paul Slud (31 March 1918, New York City – 20 February 2006, Catlett, Virginia) was an American ornithologist and tropical ecologist, known for his 1960 monograph The Birds of Finca "La Selva," Costa Rica and his 1964 book The Birds of Costa Rica: Distribution and Ecology.

Slud graduated with a bachelor's degree in geography from the City College of New York and then in 1948 took an ornithology course from Arthur A. Allen at Cornell University. Slud became a graduate student in zoology at the University of Michigan, where he graduated with M.S. in 1958 and Ph.D. in 1960. His dissertation The Birds of Finca "La Selva," Costa Rica was published in 1960 by the Bulletin of the American Museum of Natural History.

Most of his first three years as a graduate student at the University of Michigan were spent in Costa Rica, where he collected specimens for the Museum of Zoology. He also worked briefly for the Museo Nacional de Costa Rica.

Slud did extensive field work (totaling over eight years) in Costa Rica. In the early 1960s, he did field work supported by a one-year appointment at the University of Florida, a salaried Research Fellowship at the American Museum of Natural History (AMNB), and a National Science Foundation (NSF) grant. For the academic year 1961–1962 he held a Guggenheim Fellowship, which he used for his research on the birds of Cocos Island (which is now a Costa Rican national park). He also did field work: in Honduras and on Panama's Barro Colorado Island.

Slud's 1964 book The Birds of Costa Rica: Distribution and Ecology and Burt L. Monroe's A Distributional Survey of the Birds of Honduras have been important for studies of the avian fauna of Central America.

From 1964 until his retirement in 1983, Paul Slud was an associate curator in the bird division of the Smithsonian Institution's National Museum of Natural History. He was an expert on bird vocalizations.

Soon after joining the Smithsonian Institution, Dr. Slud traveled to Costa Rica as part of a research project assisting the Army on bioecological classification for military environments. An important objective of the Army project was to study a variety of habitats in detail to classify and predict plant formations and the distribution of birds.

Paul’s work concerned the distribution and general ecology of birds of Costa Rica, the relations of faunal components to climate and vegetation, and methods for broad faunal comparisons.

The American Ornithologists' Union elected him a member in 1962.

Slud married Barbara Finkenthal in 1964 in Manhattan. Upon his death he was survived by his widow, two children, and four grandchildren.
