= Craig Harline =

American historian

Craig E. Harline
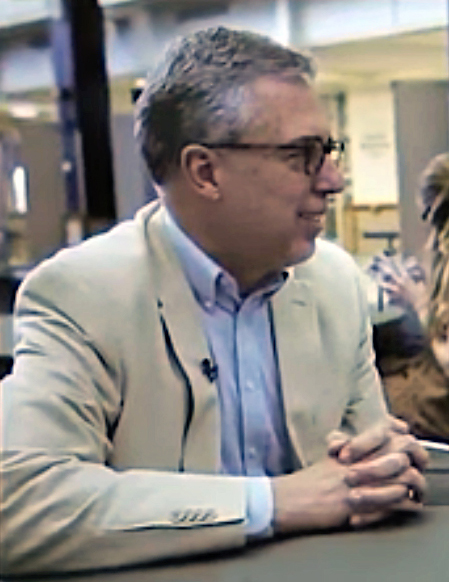
- Education: Ph.D. in European history
- Alma mater: Rutgers University
- Occupation: Historian
- Writing career
- Subjects: Early Modern Europe, religion
- Website: craigharline.com

Craig Edward Harline is a professor of history at Brigham Young University (BYU) and an author of several books. His research has focused on lived religion during the Reformation.

== Biography ==
Harline was raised in a LDS family with seven siblings in Fresno, California. He served as a missionary in Belgium in the 1970s, where he developed his interests in European history.

Harline earned a B.A. from Brigham Young University in 1980; a M.A. (1984) and Ph.D. (1986) from Rutgers University. He held teaching positions at Rutgers and the University of Idaho, before he began at BYU in 1992.

In 2017 Harline was appointed to De Lamar Jensen Professorship of early modern History, the first endowed named chair to be established in the BYU history department.

== Writings ==
- Pamphlets, Printing, and Political Culture in the Early Dutch Republic (Dordrecht; Boston: M. Nijhoff, 1987, ISBN 940093601X)
- Rhyme and Reason of Politics in Early Modern Europe: Collected Essays of Herbert H. Rowen (Dordrecht; Boston: Kluwer Academic Publishers, 1992, ISBN 9401052077)
- The Burdens of Sister Margaret: Inside a Seventeenth-Century Convent (New York: Doubleday, 1994; abridged paperback, Yale University Press, Nota Bene Series, 2000, ISBN 0300081219)
- A Bishop's Tale: Mathias Hovius Among his Flock in Seventeenth-Century Flanders, with Eddy Put (New Haven and London: Yale University Press, 2000; paperback, 2002, ISBN 0300130546)
- Miracles at the Jesus Oak: Histories of the Supernatural in Reformation Europe (New York: Doubleday, 2003; paperback, Yale University Press, 2011, ISBN 0300167024)
- Sunday: A History of the First Day from Babylonia to the Super Bowl (New York: Doubleday, 2007; paperback, 2011, ISBN 0300167032)
- Conversions: Two Family Stories from the Reformation and Modern America (New Haven: Yale University Press, 2011, ISBN 0300167415)
- Way Below the Angels: The Pretty Clearly Troubled But Not Even Close to Tragic Confessions of a Real Live Mormon Missionary (Grand Rapids: Wm. B. Eerdmans, 2014, ISBN 080287150X).
- Jacobs Vlucht: een familiesaga van de Gouden Eeuw (in Dutch, [Jacob's Flight: A Family Saga of the Golden Age]; Nijmegen, the Netherlands: Vantilt, 2016, ISBN 9460042996)
- A World Ablaze: The Rise of Martin Luther and the Birth of the Reformation (Oxford University Press, 3 October 2017, ISBN 0190275189)
