= Andrew Lossky =

American historian

Andrew Lossky (born Andrey Nikolayevich Lossky, Russian: Андрей Николаевич Лосский; 1917–1998) was a Russian-born American historian.

== Life ==
Lossky was born in Saint Petersburg, Russia. His father was a professor of philosophy at Saint Petersburg State University. In 1922 he and his family sought refuge in Czechoslovakia after being expelled by the Bolsheviks. He was educated in Prague and was taught English and French at home. From 1935 until 1938 he lived in London for his university education. With the dismemberment of Czechoslovakia in 1938, his parents decided to send Andrew abroad. He passed the doctoral exams for Yale University in 1941 and joined the United States Army, where he served as an intelligence specialist in North Africa and Italy. He gained United States' citizenship in 1944.

He returned to Yale in 1946 and completed his doctoral dissertation (‘The Baltic Question, 1679–1689’). He joined UCLA's history department in 1950, where he lectured on early modern European history. He focused on the régime of Louis XIV and argued that the absolute monarchies of the ancien régime were different from the totalitarianism of the 20th century. Lossky stressed the cosmopolitanism of early modern European culture. He was also a founding member of the Western Society for French History. He retired in 1986.

In 1990 a festschrift dedicated to Lossky was published, titled The Reign of Louis XIV. William Beik said "[t]his is no ordinary festschrift. Its well-coordinated, thematic essays constitute the first new synthesis on Louis XIV to appear for some time in English". Beik also said that the "genial figure of Andrew Lossky, radiating charm and perhaps a trace of mystery, has been a familiar sight for anyone who frequents French history conferences. His soft-spoken comments, delivered with a touch of central European elegance, have enriched many a session. His writings on the age of Louis XIV have made an important contribution, but his influence as mentor and teacher has extended farther, reaching for some the point of legend".

In 2000, Geoffrey Symcox, one of Lossky's doctoral students, said Lossky "was a true cosmopolitan, a reincarnated citizen of the Republic of Letters, in the Europe of the Old Regime that he studied and loved. ... He was a profound scholar, an inspiring teacher, and a humane, wise friend".

== Works ==
- Louis XIV, William III, and the Baltic Crisis of 1683 (University of California Press, 1954).
- ‘Introduction’, in Lynn White Jr. (ed.), The Transformation of the Roman World: Gibbon's Problem after Two Centuries (Berkeley: University of California Press, 1966, 1973), pp. 1–29.
- ‘The Absolutism of Louis XIV: Reality or Myth?’, Canadian Journal of History, Volume 19 Issue 1 (Spring 1984), pp. 1–16.
- Louis XIV and the French Monarchy (Rutgers University Press, 1994). ISBN 0813526876
