= William Beik =

American historian (1941–2017)

William Humphrey Beik (1941–2017) was an American professor of French history, specialising in early modern France.

Beik's father, Paul Beik, was a professor of history at Swarthmore College who carried out research on the French Revolution, so that William was partially educated in France. William took degrees from Haverford College (B.A. 1963) and Harvard University (M.A. 1966; Ph.D. 1969). From 1968 to 1990 he taught at Northern Illinois University, and in 1990 became Professor of French History at Emory University, retiring in 2007. His Absolutism and Society in Seventeenth-Century France (1985) received the American Historical Association's Herbert Baxter Adams Prize. He died in Pittsburgh on August 31, 2017.

== Works ==
- "Magistrates and Popular Uprisings in France before the Fronde: The Case of Toulouse," Journal of Modern History, 46 (December 1974): 585–608.
- Absolutism and Society in Seventeenth-Century France (1985)
- Urban Protest in Seventeenth-Century France (1997)
- Louis XIV and Absolutism (2000)
- A Social and Cultural History of Early Modern France (2009)
