= W. W. Kulski =

Władysław Wszebór Kulski (27 July 1903 – 16 May 1989) was a Polish political scientist.

Kulski was born in Warsaw, Poland. He was educated at the Warsaw School of Law, where he gained a Master of Laws in 1925. In 1927 he was awarded a Doctor Juris from the Paris School of Law. From 1928 until 1945 he was part of the Polish Foreign Service and from 1928 until 1933 he was a member of the League of Nations staff in the Polish Ministry of Foreign Affairs. From 1933 until 1936 Kulski was a Counsellor and then Secretary of the Polish Permanent Delegation to the League and then (until 1940) he was head of the Legal Service at the Ministry of Foreign Affairs. In 1939 Kulski was sent to London to negotiate the Anglo-Polish military alliance. Afterwards, he was editor of the Polish White Book, a collection of diplomatic documents about the origin of the Second World War. He subsequently became Minister Plenipotentiary at the UK's Polish Embassy from 1940 until 1945.

Kulski married Dr. Antonina Reutt on 29 October 1938 and in 1946 they emigrated to the United States, gaining citizenship in 1952. From 1947 until 1951 Kulski was Lecturer and then Professor of Political Science at the University of Alabama. He was Professor of Political Science at Syracuse University from 1951 until 1963 and, in 1964, Kulski was appointed James B. Duke Distinguished Professor at Duke University. He retired in 1973.

== Works ==
- (co-editor under the pseudonym W. W. Coole), Thus Spake Germany (1941).
- (co-editor under the pseudonym W. W. Coole), Anthology of Crime (1945).
- (under the pseudonym W. M. Knight-Patterson), Germany from Defeat to Conquest: 1913-1933 (1945).
- The Soviet Regime: Communism in Practice (1954, three subsequent editions in 1956, 1959, and 1963)
- Peaceful Co-Existence: An Analysis of Soviet Foreign Policy (1959).
- Handbook of Communism (1962).
- The Ethic of Power (1962).
- International Politics in a Revolutionary Age (1964).
- De Gaulle and the World: The Foreign Policy of the Fifth French Republic. 1966. OL 5995988M.
- The Soviet Union in World Affairs: A Documented Analysis (1973).
- Germany and Poland: From War to Peaceful Relations (1976).
