= Helen Palmer Henley =

American journalist (1903–1976)

- Born: Helen Elisabeth Palmer; November 26, 1903; Norwood, Ohio, U.S.
- Died: July 1976 (aged 72)
- Education: Principia College
- Occupations: Newspaper editor; reporter
- Employer: The Christian Science Monitor
- Spouse: Francis Kern Henley (m. 1925; died 1928)
- Awards: Guggenheim Fellowship (1961)

Helen Elisabeth Palmer Henley Robertson (November 26, 1903 – July 1976) was an American journalist. A 1961 Guggenheim Fellow, she worked in the staff at The Christian Science Monitor, including as a reporter, assistant to the American news editor, and farm editor.

== Biography ==
Helen Elisabeth Palmer was born on November 26, 1903, in Norwood, Ohio. She was the daughter of Nellie and lumber company manager Walter Carey Palmer. She attended Evansville Central High School, before obtaining her AA at Principia College in 1923.

After working at Principia Publications as an assistant editor (1929–1932), she joined the staff team of The Christian Science Monitor in 1934. After spending almost a decade as an advertising copywriter, she was promoted to assistant woman's editor in 1949 and assistant to the American news editor in 1949, before becoming a general news reporter in 1950. In 1956, she returned to the newspaper's editorial staff as their farm editor. She also taught at her alma mater Principia College as a summer writing lecturer from 1956 until 1958. In 1961, she was awarded a Guggenheim Fellowship for "a study of the family farm in the contemporary United States". Henley, who by then had retired from The Christian Science Monitor and assumed the surname Robertson, she was a speaker at the 1971 luncheon of the National League of American Pen Women Cahokia Valley Branch.

On June 15, 1925, she married Francis Kern Henley, a corset shop manager in Saginaw, Michigan. They were married until his death on August 31, 1928. Henley herself died in July 1976.
