= Leonila Vázquez García =

Mexican entomologist

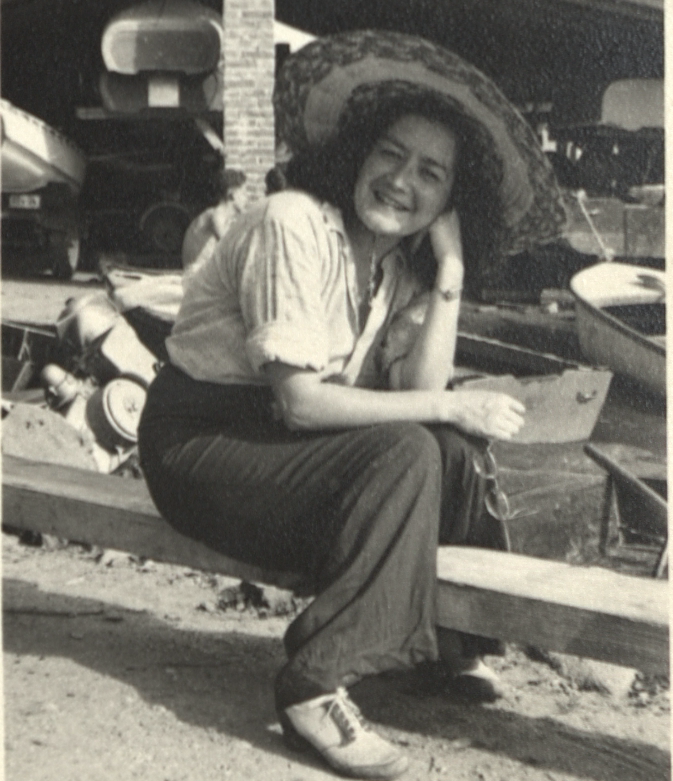
- Dr. Vázquez doing field work in Mexico
- Born: 17 January 1914; Ciudad Jiménez, Chihuahua, Mexico
- Died: 30 January 1995 (aged 81); Mexico City, Mexico
- Years active: 1946-1979
- Known for: Entomology

Leonila Vázquez García (17 January 1914 – 30 January 1995), known as Leonila Vázquez, was a Mexican entomologist and awardee of the Mexican Entomology Society's 1971 Entomological Merit medal. She is known for the study of the biology of the cochineal (Dactylopius coccus), an insect species used to create the red dye carmine. She was also a renowned butterfly researcher, contributing the first butterfly section to the Encyclopedia of Mexico and describing 39 new species to science throughout her career.

She started teaching in the Faculty of Science at UNAM (National Autonomous University of Mexico) in 1943, where she was a distinguished researcher in the university's Institute of Biology for over 50 years.

== Education ==
Leonila Vázquez García was born on January 17, 1914, in the city of Jiménez in the northern state of Chihuahua, Mexico. She moved to Mexico City with her family at a young age and completed her primary and secondary education in the city's public school system. Dr. Vázquez went to high school at the National Preparatory School (Escuela Nacional Preparatoria) and completed her undergraduate degree in the Faculty of Philosophy and Letters of UNAM.

On October 3, 1936, she received a master's degree in biological sciences by completing a thesis entitled, Harmful insects of the 'tepozanes' (Budleia) of Central Mexico. She went on to receive her doctorate in Biological Sciences from the UNAM Faculty of Sciences in 1945 with a dissertation entitled: Monographic study of the Psychidae (Lepidoptera) of Mexico. Over the course of her life, she contributed heavily to UNAM as a professor, researcher, and cultural leader.

== Biological research ==
Vázquez dedicated her career to academia and research. Upon the death of her mentor, Carlos C. Hoffman, in 1942, she took over the third-year Zoology course in the UNAM Faculty of Sciences, which covered the large and complex group of animals known as arthropods, and led this course until 1990. She also taught numerous doctorate courses on entomology and insect ecology from 1950 to 1967, where she mentored and taught over 1800 students, including José Sarukhán Kermez. She supervised 36 theses on biological sciences throughout her tenure at UNAM.

As a researcher, she studied various aspects of butterfly (Lepidoptera) biology, and described several new species to science. Within her research, she worked with Papilionidae, Pieridae, Nymphalidae, Satumiidae, Sphingidae and Psychidae, among others, contributing to over 50 scientific publications. Throughout her butterfly research, she worked closely with butterfly specialist, Dr. Carlos R. Beutelspacher. She was particularly interested in studying and describing the relationship between butterflies and trophic vegetation, as well as how these species impact their habitat. She also wrote the first section on butterflies for the Encyclopedia of Mexico.

In 1952, she began collaborating with the Indigenous Institute (Instituto Indigenista) on a study of the traditional cultivation of the cochineal (Dactylopius coccus Costa) and the aje (Llaveia axin). Cochineal are used to create the red dye carmine, while aje are used to create lacquers. These insects were once of significant economic importance to certain regions of Mexico during the colonial period.

In 1958, Vázquez participated in the first UNAM scientific expedition to the Revillagigedo Islands, a volcanic archipelago located in the Pacific Ocean off the coast of Mexico. They are known for unique ecology, with a high level of endemism, and are currently protected as a UNESCO World Heritage Site and North America's largest marine protected area. She was joined on this expedition by renowned Mexican scientists Bernardo Villa, Faustino Miranda, Teófilo Herrera, Alejandro Villalobos, Gonzalo Pérez Higareda, and Héctor Pérez. She also collaborated with Alejandro Villalobos to write the textbook Zoology of the Phylum Arthropoda, a central text to studying zoology at UNAM.

== Public service and conservation efforts ==
Throughout the 1940s and 1950s, Vázquez participated in numerous studies in Southern Mexico in the Puebla and Oaxaca regions, where she helped repair the flow of the Papaloapan River alongside the Papaloapan Commission.

In 1957, she worked with the Laboratory of Hydrobiology of the Institute of Biology and Parasitology of the Faculty of Medicine at UNAM on a project to eradicate onchocerciasis, or river blindness.

In 1984, she worked with the Institute of Biology and the Secretary of Urban Development and Ecology to create programs for the protection and study of the monarch butterfly (Danaus plexiblus L.).

To learn more about organizing entomology collections, she planned a research trip to the Museum of Natural History in New York, the Smithsonian Institution in Washington, D.C., the Field Museum in Chicago, and several museums in Los Angeles and San Diego, California.

== Honors and awards ==
Throughout her career, Vázquez participated in numerous societies including the Entomological Society of America (1932–1982), the Mexican Society of Natural History (1946), The Lepidopterist's Society (where she was vice president twice, in 1958 and 1969), the Society for the Study of Evolution (1961–1982), and the Association for Tropical Biology (1968–1982). She was also an honorary member of the International Union for the Conservation of Nature (IUCN) in 1977 as honorary consultant to the Survival Service Commission of the IUCN as a member of the Lepidoptera Special Group.

From 1952 to 1977, she was a founding member of the Mexican Society of Entomology, the Academy of Scientific Research, the Mexican Society of Genetics, and the Mexican Society of Zoology.

In 1971, Vázquez received the medal of Entomological Merit from the Mexican Society of Entomology. She also received honorary degrees from the Mexican Society of Zoology and the Faculty of Biological Sciences of the University of Veracruz.

Vázquez described 39 species of plants and animals, including butterflies, mites, crustaceans, nematodes, and plants. The Fouquieria leonila, a plant endemic to the state of Guerrero, Mexico, was named after her.

She served in many leadership positions at UNAM throughout the 1970s, including as a member of the internal consulting committee, president of the college of investigators, adviser to the biology stations of the university, and a member of the editorial committee of the journal Serie Zoológica. She also served as the head of the department of zoology from 1976 to 1979.

=== Dedicated species ===
Many species have been named after and dedicated to Vázquez:

- Fouquieria leonilae
- Litomosoides leonivazquezae
- Ruizia leonilae
- Polycryptocylix leonilae
- Procambarus vazquezae
- Melanoplerus vazquezae
- Empoasca vasquezae
- Phenogodes vazquezae
- Hydroptila vazquezae
- Protesilaus philolaus f. vazquezae
- Heliconius charitonius vazquezae
- Coloradia vazquezae
- Melanchroia vazquezae
- Synopsia leonilaria
