= Herbert Baxter Adams Prize =

American award for a book published in English in the field of European history

The Herbert Baxter Adams Prize is an annual book prize of the American Historical Association. It is awarded for "a distinguished first book by a young scholar in the field of European history", and is named in honor of Herbert Baxter Adams, who was from the faculty of Johns Hopkins University and one of the founders of the AHA.

Established in 1905, the prize was at first awarded biennially. There was a hiatus in awards from 1930 until 1938. Since 1971 it has been awarded annually. In 1986 eligibility for the prize was changed from "American citizens" to "citizens and permanent residents of the United States and Canada".

The prize is one of the most prestigious awards offered by the U.S. historical profession. Previous recipients include Henry Steele Commager, Gordon A. Craig, James S. Donnelly Jr., Arno Mayer and Joan Wallach Scott.

== List of recipients ==
Source: American Historical Association

- 2026 — Barbara Di Gennaro Splendore, The State Drug: Theriac, Pharmacy, and Politics in Early Modern Italy
- 2025 — Charlotte Lydia Riley, Imperial Island: An Alternative History of the British Empire
- 2024 — Alexander Statman, A Global Enlightenment: Western Progress and Chinese Science
- 2023 — Clara E. Mattei, The Capital Order: How Economists Invented Austerity and Paved the Way to Fascism
- 2022 — Dan-el Padilla Peralta, Divine Institutions: Religions and Community in the Middle Roman Republic
- 2021 — Stefan J. Link, Forging Global Fordism: Nazi Germany, Soviet Russia, and the Contest over the Industrial Order
- 2020 — Alexander Bevilacqua, The Republic of Arabic Letters: Islam and the European Enlightenment
- 2019 — Mar Hicks, Programmed Inequality: How Britain Discarded Women Technologists and Lost Its Edge in Computing
- 2018 — Hussein Fancy, The Mercenary Mediterranean: Sovereignty, Religion, and Violence in the Medieval Crown of Aragon
- 2017 — Max Bergholz, Violence as a Generative Force: Identity, Nationalism, and Memory in a Balkan Community
- 2016 — Vittoria Di Palma, Wasteland: A History
- 2015 — Emily J. Levine, Dreamland of Humanists: Warburg, Cassirer, Panofsky, and the Hamburg School
- 2014 — Daniela Bleichmar, Visible Empire: Botanical Expeditions and Visual Culture in the Hispanic Enlightenment
- 2013 — Steven Barnes, Death and Redemption: The Gulag and the Shaping of Soviet Society
- 2012 — E. Natalie Rothman, Brokering Empire: Trans-Imperial Subjects Between Venice and Istanbul
- 2011 — Anna Krylova, Soviet Women in Combat: A History of Violence in the Eastern Front
- 2010 — Karl Appuhn, A Forest on the Sea: Environmental Expertise in Renaissance Venice
- 2009 — Priya Satia, Spies in Arabia: The Great War and the Cultural Foundations of Britain's Covert Empire in the Middle East
- 2008 — Carol Symes, A Common Stage: Theater and Public Life in Medieval Arras
- 2007 — Francine Hirsch, Empire of Nations: Ethnographic Knowledge and the Making of the Soviet Union
- 2006 — Stephanie Siegmund, The Medici State and the Ghetto of Florence: the Construction of an Early Modern Jewish Community
- 2005 — Maureen Healy, Vienna and the Fall of the Habsburg Empire: Total War and Everyday Life in World War I
- 2004 — Ethan H. Shagan, Popular Politics and the English Reformation
- 2003 — Terry Martin, The Affirmative Action Empire: Nations and Nationalism in the Soviet Union, 1923-1939
- 2002 — Florin Curta, The Making of the Slavs: History and Archaeology of the Lower Danube Region, ca. 500–700
- 2001 — Malachi Haim Hacohen, Karl Popper, the Formative Years, 1902–1945: Politics and Philosophy in Interwar Vienna
- 2000 — Daniel Lord Smail, Imaginary Cartographies: Possession and Identity in Late Medieval Marseille
- 1999 — Gabrielle Hecht, The Radiance of France: Nuclear Power and National Identity after World War II
- 1998 — David Nirenberg, Communities of Violence: Persecution of Minorities in the Middle Ages
- 1997 — Pieter M. Judson, Exclusive Revolutionaries: Liberal Politics, Social Experience, and National Identity in the Austrian Empire, 1848–1914
- 1996 — Mary C. Mansfield, The Humiliation of Sinners: Public Penance in Thirteenth-Century France
- 1995 — James H. Johnson, Listening in Paris: a Cultural History
- 1994 — John Martin, Venice's Hidden Enemies: Italian Heretics in a Renaissance City
- 1993 — Charters Wynn, Workers, strikes, and pogroms : the Donbass-Dnepr Bend in late Imperial Russia, 1870–1905
- 1992 — Suzanne Desan, Reclaiming the sacred : religious and popular politics in Revolutionary France
- 1991 — Theodore Koditschek, Class Formation and Urban-Industrial Society: Bradford, 1750–1850
- 1990 — Richard C. Hoffmann, Land, Liberties, and Lordship in a Late Medieval Countryside: Agrarian Structures and Change in the Duchy of Wroclaw
- 1989 — Jan E. Goldstein, Console and Classify: the French Psychiatric Profession in the Nineteenth Century
- 1988 — No award
- 1987 — Peter Jelavich, Munich and Theatrical Modernism: Politics, Playwriting, and Performances, 1890–1914
- 1986 — William Beik, Absolutism and Society in Seventeenth-Century France: State Power and Provincial Aristocracy in Languedoc
- 1985 — Jonathan Sperber, Popular Catholicism in Nineteenth-Century Germany
- 1984 — Robert C. Palmer, The County Courts of Medieval England: 1150–1350
- 1983 — Roberta Thompson Manning, The Crisis of the Old Order in Russia: Gentry and Government
- 1982 — Edward Muir, Civic Ritual in Renaissance Venice
- 1981 — William H. Sewell Jr., Work and Revolution in France: the Language of the Old Regime to 1848
- 1980 — William E. Kapelle, The Norman Conquest of the North: the Region and its Transformation, 1000–1135
- 1979 — Kendall E. Bailes, Technology and Society under Lenin and Stalin: Origins of the Soviet Technical Intelligentsia, 1917-1941
- 1978 — A. N. Galpern, The Religions of the People in Sixteenth-Century Champagne
- 1977 — Charles S. Maier, Recasting Bourgeois Europe: Stabilization in France, Germany, and Italy in the Decade after World War I
- 1976 — Frederick H. Russell, The Just War in the Middle Ages
- 1975 — James S. Donnelly Jr., The Land and the People of Nineteenth-Century Cork: the Rural Economy and the Land Question
- 1974 — Joan Wallach Scott, The glassworkers of Carmaux: French craftsmen and political action in a nineteenth-century city
- 1973 — Martin Jay, The Dialectical Imagination: a History of the Frankfurt School and the Institute for Social Research, 1923–1950
- 1972 — Richard Hellie, Enserfment and military change in Muscovy
- 1971 — Edward E. Malefakis, Agrarian Reform and Peasant Revolution in Spain: Origins of the Civil War
- 1970 — John P. McKay, Pioneers for Profit: Foreign Entrepreneurship and Russian Industrialization, 1885–1913
- 1968 — Arno J. Mayer, Politics and Diplomacy of Peacemaking: Containment and Counterrevolution at Versailles, 1918–1919
- 1966 — Gabriel Jackson, The Spanish Republic and the Civil War, 1931–1939
- 1964 — Archibald S. Foord, His Majesty’s Opposition, 1714–1830
- 1962 — Jerome Blum, Lord and Peasant in Russia from the Ninth to the Nineteenth Century
- 1960 — Caroline Robbins, The eighteenth-century commonwealthman
- 1958 — Arthur Wilson, Diderot : the testing years, 1713-1759
- 1956 — Gordon Craig, The Politics of the Prussian Army, 1640–1945
- 1954 — W. C. Richardson, Tudor Chamber Administration, 1485–1547
- 1952 — Arthur J. May, The Habsburg Monarchy, 1867–1914
- 1950 — Hans W. Gatzke, Germany’s drive to the west (Drang nach Westen) A study of Germany’s western war aims during the First World War
- 1948 — Raymond de Roover, The Medici bank: its organization, management, operations, and decline
- 1946 — A. W. Salomone, Italian Democracy in the Making
- 1944 — R. H. Fisher, The Russian Fur Trade, 1550–1700
- 1942 — E. Harris Harbison, Rival Ambassadors at the Court of Queen Mary
- 1940 — John Shelton Curtiss, Church and State in Russia: the Last Years of the Empire, 1900–1917
- 1938 — Arthur McCandless Wilson, French Foreign Policy During the Administration of Cardinal Fleury, 1726–1743
- 1937 — No award
- 1935 — No award
- 1933 — No award
- 1931 — Vernon J. Puryear, England, Russia, and the Straits Question
- 1929 — Henry Steele Commager, Struensee and the Reform Movement in Denmark
- 1927 — William F. Galpin, The British Grain Trade in the Napoleonic Period
- 1925 — Frederick S. Rodkey, The Turko-Egyptian Question in the Relations of England, France, and Russia, 1832–1841
- 1922 — John Thomas McNeill, History of the Oath Ex Officio in England by Mary Hume Maguire: The Celtic Penitentials and their Influence on Continental Christianity
- 1921 — Elinar Joranson, The Danegeld in France
- 1919 — William Thomas Morgan, English Political Parties and Leaders in the Reign of Queen Anne, 1702–1710
- 1917 — Frederick L. Nussbaum, Commercial Policy in the French Revolution: a Study of the Career of G. J. A. Ducher
- 1915 — Theodore Calvin Pease, The Leveller Movement: a Study in the History and Political Theory of the English Great Civil War
- 1913 — Violet Barbour, Henry Bennet, Earl of Arlington, Secretary of State to Charles II
- 1911 — Louise Fargo Brown, The Political Activities of the Baptists and Fifth Monarchy Men in England During the Interregnum
- 1909 — Wallace Notestein, A History of Witchcraft in England from 1558 to 1718
- 1907 — Two awards;
  - Edward B. Krehbiel, The Interdict, its History and its Operation, with Especial Attention to the Time of Pope Innocent III
  - William S. Robertson, Francisco de Miranda and the Revolutionizing of Spanish America
- 1905 — David S. Muzzey, The Spiritual Franciscans

== See also ==
- List of history awards
