= Council for European Studies =

Academic organization at Temple University

- Abbreviation: CES
- Formation: 1970
- Type: Non-profit (IRS exemption status): 501(c)(3)
- Purpose: Education, Publications
- Headquarters: Temple University, PA, PA
- Key people: Eamonn Butler McIntosh (CES Chair); Abigail Lewis (CES Executive Director)
- Website: http://councilforeuropeanstudies.org

The Council for European Studies (CES), based at Temple University, is an academic organization for the study of Europe. It offers scholarships and research grants, publications, and an annual conference.

== History ==
The Council for European Studies was founded in 1970 with a grant from the Ford Foundation. First located at the University of Pittsburgh, CES recently moved its headquarters from Columbia University to Temple University. CES was originally formed as a limited consortium of Western European studies programs at eight major U.S. universities: University of California Berkeley, Columbia University, Harvard, Princeton, Massachusetts Institute of Technology, University of Michigan, University of Wisconsin, and Yale. However, it ceased to be a consortium of eight in 1972, when twenty other universities were invited to become institutional members.

Since that time, its institutional membership has grown substantially. Its institutional members currently include over 100 universities, colleges, and institutes around the world. Moreover, although membership was once restricted to institutions, CES has opened its membership rolls to individuals and now counts about 1,200 individuals as organization members. Membership provides access to the full range of CES fellowship and award competitions, publications, research resources, and professional development opportunities.

The Council for European Studies is an independent, 501(c)(3) not-for-profit organization.

== Grants, Fellowships, and Awards ==
CES sponsors a variety of fellowship and award competitions for graduate students and scholars of European Studies, which are available exclusively to individual CES members, as well as students, faculty, and researchers affiliated with CES member institutions.

- Mellon-CES Dissertation Completion Fellowships
- Alliance-CES Pre-Dissertation Research Fellowships
- Harriman-CES Pre-Dissertation Research Fellowships
- SAE-CES Pre-Dissertation Research Fellowships
- European Studies First Book Award
- European Studies First Article Prizes
- Conference Travel Grants

== International Conference of Europeanists ==
The Council for European Studies hosts an annual conference.

Conference	Year	Country	City	Conference Venue/Host Institution
18th	2011	Spain	Barcelona	Institut Barcelona d'Estudis Internacionals (IBEI)
19th	2012	US	Boston	Omni Parker House
20th	2013	Netherlands	Amsterdam	University of Amsterdam
21st	2014	US	Washington, D.C.	Omni Shoreham Hotel
22nd	2015	France	Paris	Sciences Po
23rd	2016	US	Philadelphia	DoubleTree by Hilton Philadelphia Center City
24th	2017	UK	Glasgow	University of Glasgow
25th	2018	US	Chicago	InterContinental Chicago Magnificent Mile
26th	2019	Spain	Madrid	Universidad Carlos III de Madrid
27th	2021	Online Conference]		
28th	2022	Portugal	Lisbon	University of Lisbon
29th	2023	Iceland	Reykjavík	University of Iceland
30th	2024	France	Lyon	Université Lumière Lyon II; Sciences Po Lyon
31st	2025	USA	Philadelphia	Temple University
32nd	2026	Ireland	Dublin	University College, Dublin

== Publications ==
CES is a leading publisher of research on Europe. The organization's publications include:

- EuropeNow
- Perspectives on Europe
- Reviews & Critical Commentary (CritCom)
- European Studies Newsletter

=== Former publications ===
- CES Resource Guide

== Research networks ==
The following research networks are currently supported by the Council for European Studies:

- Business in Politics and Society
- Critical European Studies
- European Culture
- European Integration and the Global Political Economy – New Directions
- Gender and Sexuality
- Health & Wellbeing
- Historical Study of States and Regimes
- Immigration
- Law
- Political Economy and Welfare
- Political Parties, Party Systems and Elections
- Race and Racism in Europe
- Radicalism and Violence
- Social Movements
- Territorial Politics and Federalism
- Transnational Memory and Identity in Europe
