= Sesto Prete =

Italian-born American philologist and paleographer

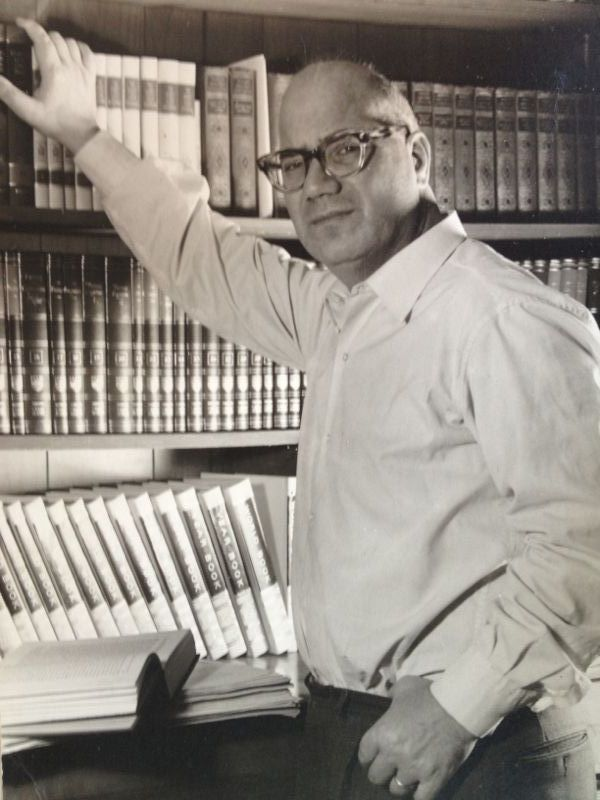
Sesto Prete

Sesto Prete (September 27, 1919 in Montefiore dell'Aso - June 15, 1991 in Cagli, Italy) was an Italian-born American philologist and paleographer.

== Biography ==
Sesto Prete studied classical philology in Italy and Germany, graduating first in Cologne in 1944 with Gunther Jachmann presenting a thesis on the concept of humanitas in Roman comedy, and then in Bologna in 1945 with Pietro Ferrarino, discussing a thesis on the concept of "Liberalitas" in the Roman comedy.

Prete taught as a Lecturer in Latin at the University of Bologna (1946–1949) and as Professor of Latin and Greek at the high school of Forlì. In 1955 he was Scientific Collaborator in the Vatican Library. He then moved to the United States, where he was a Professor from 1956 to 1968 at Fordham University in New York City. He then taught at the University of Kansas in Lawrence, Kansas, until 1990.

Many of his studies and his publications relate to the text, tradition and good fortune of Plautus and especially Terentius. Among the Latin authors he has privileged the study of Ausonius but also of Cicero, Catullus, Virgilius, the two Plinius, Priscianus, Columella, Sidonius Apollinaris, Apuleius, Tertullianus and Cyprianus. He was specialized in the field of Medieval and Humanism. He has worked extensively on Ratherius and Innocentius III, Marco Polo, Dante and Petrarca. The Latin poetry of the fifteenth and sixteenth centuries, and especially the religious poetry of poets active in Ferrara and Urbino, and also Bruni, Poliziano, Tito Vespasiano Strozzi and Pontano, Giulio Cesare Scaligero and Guillaume du Bartas. He also studied some humanist thinkers like Pius II, Poggio and Valla, Phoebus Capella, Giacomo and Antonio Costanzi, Joachim Camerarius and Niccolò Perotti.

He was also the promoter and conference organizer, curator and director of acts of magazines. Due to his international activity he has been responsible for fostering relationships, comparison and exchange of ideas between various countries and especially between Italy, Germany and America. In 1978 he founded the magazine "Res Publica Litterarum. Studies in the Classical Tradition", which he directed until 1991.

== Works ==
- Saggi Pliniani, studi pubblicati dall'Istituto di Filologia classica dell'Università di Bologna 3, Bologna, Zuffi,1948
- Il codice Bembino di Terenzio, Studi e Testi 153, Città del Vaticano, Biblioteca Apostolica Vticana, 1950.
- P. Terenti Afri Comoediae, Heidelberg, F.H. Kerle, 1954.
- Didascaliae: Studies in Honor of Anselm M. Albareda 1961 ISBN 9781258131678
- Two Humanistic Anthologies Studi e Testi 230, Città del Vaticano, Biblioteca Apostolica Vaticana, 1964.
- Galileo's Letter about the libration of the Moon John F. Fleming, New York, 1965
- Observations on the History of Textual Criticism in the Medieval and Renaissance Period 1968, St. John's University Press.
- Il codice di Terenzio Vaticano Latino 3226, Studi e Testi 262, Città del Vaticano, Biblioteca Apostolica Vaticana, 1970.
- Decimi Magni Ausonii Opuscola Leipzig, Teubner, 1978.
- Studies in Latin Poets of the Quattrocento 1978, The University of Kansas.
- L'Umanista Niccolò Perotti, Sassoferrato, Istituto Internazionale di Studi Piceni, 1980.
- I Codici di Terenzio e quelli di Lucano nella Herzog August Bibliothek di Wolfenbuttel 1982. ISBN 3-88373-030-0
- Tra filologi e studiosi della nostra epoca: dalla corrispondenza di Gunther Jachmann, Didascaliae I, Pesaro, Belli, 1984.
- Pagine amare di storia della filologia classica. Dalla corrispondenza di Edoardo Fraenkel a Gunther Jachmann, Didascaliae III, Sassoferrato, Istituto Internazionale di Studi Piceni, 1987.
- Capitoli su Terenzio, Didascaliae IV, Sassoferrato, Istituto Internazionale di Studi Piceni, 1990.
- Lettere di Edoardo Fraenkel a Gunther Jachmann, a cura di P.Gatti, Didascaliae V e VI, voll. 1 e 2, Fano Editrice Fortuna, 1996-1997.
