= Deaths in June 2015 =

The following is a list of notable deaths in June 2015.

Entries for each day are listed alphabetically by surname. A typical entry lists information in the following sequence:

- Name, age, country of citizenship and reason for notability, established cause of death, reference.

== June 2015 ==
=== 1 ===
- Alexandra Prinzessin von Hannover, 77, German politician.
- Shone An, 31, Taiwanese singer (Comic Boyz) and actor, liver cancer.
- Katherine Chappell, 29, American visual effects editor (Game of Thrones, Captain America: The Winter Soldier, Godzilla), lion attack.
- Jon Hensley, 31, American radio personality, asphyxiation.
- Charles Jacob, 94, English stockbroker.
- Ian Jones, 75, Welsh rugby union player.
- Charles Kennedy, 55, British politician, Leader of the Liberal Democrats (1999–2006), MP (1983–2015), internal haemorrhage.
- Joan Kirner, 76, Australian politician, Premier of Victoria (1990–1992), oesophageal cancer.
- Peter Kruse, 60, German psychologist, heart failure.
- Mike Lane, 82, American actor (The Harder They Fall, Monster Squad, Ulysses Against the Son of Hercules).
- Ronald H. Lingren, 79, American politician.
- Nicholas Liverpool, 80, Dominican politician, President (2003–2012).
- Nobutaka Machimura, 70, Japanese politician, Speaker of the House of Representatives (2014–2015), Minister for Foreign Affairs (2004–2006, 2007), cerebral infarction.
- Buck Moyer, 94, American Lutheran pastor, Bishop of the Virginia Synod (1976–1987).
- Jacques Parizeau, 84, Canadian politician, Premier of Quebec (1994–1996).
- Kirill Pokrovsky, 53, Russian composer.
- Serajur Rahman, 81, Bangladeshi journalist and broadcaster.
- Sonya Rapoport, 92, American conceptual and digital artist, pancreatic cancer.
- Jean Ritchie, 92, American folk singer and song collector.
- Tommy Rogers, 54, American professional wrestler (The Fantastics).
- Andy Scrivani, 98, American Olympic boxer (1936).
- Dolores Richard Spikes, 78, American mathematician.
- Phili Viehoff, 90, Dutch politician, member of the European Parliament (1979–1989).
- Tadeusz Józef Zawistowski, 85, Polish Roman Catholic prelate, Auxiliary Bishop of Łomża (1973–2006).
- Robert K. Zukowski, 85, American farmer and politician.

=== 2 ===
- Ifeoma Aggrey-Fynn, 34, Nigerian media personality, shot.
- Claudio Angelini, 72, Italian political correspondent.
- Fernando de Araújo, 52, East Timorese politician, President of the National Parliament (2007–2012), Acting President (2008), stroke.
- Miguel-Ángel Cárdenas, 80, Colombian-born Dutch artist.
- Shufti Chaudhri, 95, Pakistani World War II British Indian Army officer.
- Martin Cole, 83, British sexologist.
- Alberto De Martino, 85, Italian film director (O.K. Connery, Holocaust 2000, The Pumaman).
- Walter Dexter, 83, Canadian ceramic artist.
- Giovan Battista Fabbri, 89, Italian football player and manager (Vicenza).
- Ortho R. Fairbanks, 90, American sculptor.
- Dennis Fidler, 76, English footballer (Halifax Town, Macclesfield Town).
- Gene Maddox, 76, American politician, Mayor of Clive, Iowa (1977–1992), member of the Iowa General Assembly (1993–2007).
- Gordon S. Marshall, 95, American electronics entrepreneur and philanthropist.
- John Mellekas, 81, American football player (Chicago Bears, San Francisco 49ers, Philadelphia Eagles).
- Eugen Mwaiposa, 54, Tanzanian politician, MP for Ukonga (since 2010).
- Clemens Nathan, 81, British humanitarian.
- Bijoya Ray, 98, Indian actress, pneumonia.
- Irwin Rose, 88, American biologist, Nobel laureate (2004).
- Theo Saat, 87, Dutch Olympic sprinter (1952).
- Shockley Shoemake, 92, American politician.
- Silvio Spaccesi, 88, Italian actor and voice actor.
- Kenneth Tempest, 93, British World War II Royal Air Force navigator.
- Ralph Ungermann, 73, American engineer and entrepreneur, complications from Lewy body dementia.
- Besim Üstünel, 88, Turkish academic and politician.
- Tsonyo Vasilev, 63, Bulgarian footballer (CSKA Sofia).
- Carmine Vingo, 85, American heavyweight boxer.
- Herb Wakabayashi, 70, Canadian-born Japanese Olympic ice hockey player (1972, 1976, 1980).
- Charls Walker, 91, American economist and lobbyist.
- Norm Weiss, 79, Canadian politician.
- Stephen Wojdak, 76, American lobbyist and politician, member of the Pennsylvania House of Representatives (1969–1976), respiratory failure.

=== 3 ===
- Lester Bower, 67, American mass murderer, execution by lethal injection.
- Horst Brandstätter, 81, German company owner, founder of Playmobil.
- Thomas Flynn, 83, Irish Roman Catholic prelate, Bishop of Achonry (1976–2007).
- Bevo Francis, 82, American college basketball player (Rio Grande College).
- Andrew V. Granato, 89, American theoretical physicist.
- Paul Hackel, American politician, member of the New Hampshire House of Representatives.
- Leszek Hensler, 59, Polish Olympic hockey player.
- Margaret Juntwait, 58, American radio broadcaster, host of Metropolitan Opera radio broadcasts (2004–2014), ovarian cancer.
- Eugene Kennedy, 86, American psychologist and theologian.
- Bud Kraehling, 96, American journalist and weatherman, cancer.
- Ricardo Morán, 74, Argentine actor.
- Nidoïsh Naisseline, 69, New Caledonian politician, President of Loyalty Islands Province (1995–1999).
- Fouad Qandil, 71, Egyptian author.
- Imre Rapp, 77, Hungarian international football player.

=== 4 ===
- Avi Beker, 64, Israeli academic, secretary-general of the World Jewish Congress (2001–2003).
- Bengt Berndtsson, 82, Swedish footballer (IFK Göteborg).
- Edith Hancke, 86, German actress.
- Wayne Harris, 77, American Hall of Fame CFL football player (Calgary Stampeders).
- Hugh Johnson, 69, Irish cinematographer (The Chronicles of Riddick, G.I. Jane, Eragon).
- Julien Mawule Kouto, 68, Togolese Roman Catholic prelate, Bishop of Atakpamé (1993–2006).
- Charlie Morris, 88, British-born Australian naval officer and Olympic hammer thrower (1956).
- Chalood Nimsamer, 86, Thai artist.
- Marguerite Patten, 99, British cookery writer, home economist and broadcaster.
- Leonid Plyushch, 77, Ukrainian Soviet dissident and mathematician.
- Jørgen Ravn, 75, Danish footballer (Aberdeen).
- Henry T. Sampson, American electrical engineer and inventor.
- Roy Stroud, 90, English footballer (West Ham).
- Jabe Thomas, 85, American racecar driver (NASCAR), complications from Parkinson's disease.
- Dame Anne Warburton, 87, British diplomat, Ambassador to Denmark (1976–1983), Permanent Representative to the UN in Geneva (1983–1985), President of Lucy Cavendish College (1985–1994).
- Kurt Weber, 87, Polish cinematographer (Salto).
- Ray Weigh, 86, Welsh footballer.
- Albert West, 65, Dutch singer (The Shuffles) and record producer.
- Benjamin H. Woodbridge, 80, American politician.
- Hermann Zapf, 96, German typeface designer (Optima, Palatino, Zapfino).

=== 5 ===
- Mehmet Abbasoğlu, 59, Turkish Kurdish politician, cancer.
- Govindrao Adik, 76, Indian politician.
- John "Tiny" Andrews, 63, American football player (Miami Dolphins).
- Tariq Aziz, 79, Iraqi politician, Foreign Minister (1983–1991), heart attack.
- Eshel Ben-Jacob, 63, Israeli physicist.
- Alan Bond, 77, British-born Australian businessman and convicted fraudster, complications from heart surgery.
- Sadun Boro, 87, Turkish sailor, bladder cancer.
- Manuel Camacho Solís, 69, Mexican politician, Mayor of Mexico City (1988–1993), Foreign Minister (1993–1994), Senator (since 2012).
- Kazuo Chiba, 75, Japanese Aikido teacher.
- Jerry Collins, 34, Samoan-born New Zealand rugby union player (national team), traffic collision.
- Xavier de Roux, 74, French politician.
- Frits Dragstra, 87, Dutch politician, member of the House of Representatives (1972–1977).
- Giacomo Furia, 90, Italian actor (The Band of Honest Men, The Gold of Naples).
- Anita Hagen, 84, Canadian politician, cancer.
- Jane Briggs Hart, 93, American aviator, member of the Mercury 13, founding member of NOW, Alzheimer's disease.
- Ralph Hyde, 76, British curator.
- Jill Hyem, 78, British scriptwriter and actress.
- Norma J. Lang, 82, American phycologist, heart failure.
- Colette Marchand, 90, French ballerina and actress (Moulin Rouge).
- Te Uruhina McGarvey, 87, New Zealand Māori elder.
- Worth McMillion, 88, American racing car driver.
- Paul A. Miller, 98, American academic, President of the Rochester Institute of Technology (1969–1979).
- Irving Mondschein, 91, American Olympic athlete (1948) and coach.
- Lecretia Seales, 42, New Zealand lawyer and right-to-die campaigner, brain cancer.
- George Seitz, 73, Australian politician, member of the Victorian Legislative Assembly for Keilor (1982–2010).
- Paolo Tullio, 65, Italian-born Irish Michelin Star-winning chef (Armstrong's Barn) and resident food critic (The Restaurant).
- Roger Vergé, 85, French chef, co-founder of Nouvelle Cuisine, complications from diabetes.
- Seth Winston, 64, American screenwriter and director (She's Out of Control, Session Man), Oscar winner (1992), heart attack.

=== 6 ===
- Barry Albin-Dyer, 64, British undertaker, brain cancer.
- Aarthi Agarwal, 31, American Telugu cinema actress, heart attack.
- Pierre Brice, 86, French actor (Old Shatterhand, Mill of the Stone Women), pneumonia.
- M. N. Buch, 80, Indian urban planner.
- Vincent Bugliosi, 80, American prosecuting attorney (Tate–LaBianca murders case) and author (Helter Skelter, Reclaiming History), cancer.
- Callisto Cosulich, 92, Italian film critic, author and screenwriter (Planet of the Vampires).
- Jorge Galemire, 64, Uruguayan musician (Trelew).
- Ronnie Gilbert, 88, American singer-songwriter (The Weavers) and actress (Running on Empty).
- Colin Jackson, 68, Scottish footballer (Rangers, national team), leukaemia.
- Richard Johnson, 87, English actor (The Haunting, Julius Caesar, The Boy in the Striped Pyjamas).
- John Coleman Laidlaw, 93–94, Canadian endocrinologist, kidney disease.
- Dieter Medicus, 86, German jurist.
- Nyla Murphy, 83, American politician, bile duct cancer.
- Steve Nave, American actor and casting director, cancer.
- Steve Pritko, 94, American football player (Cleveland Rams).
- Feras Saied, 34, Syrian bodybuilder, traffic collision.
- Sergey Sharikov, 40, Russian sabre fencer, two-time Olympic champion (1996, 2000), traffic collision.
- Ludvík Vaculík, 88, Czech writer and journalist.
- John Williams, 87, American art historian.

=== 7 ===
- Sheikh Razzak Ali, 86, Bangladeshi politician.
- Martin Alper, 72, British video game developer.
- Ken Barrett, 77, English footballer (Aston Villa).
- Giuseppe Casarrubea, 69, Italian historian and author.
- Bob Casey, 83, American physician and politician.
- Ahmad Ghazi, 79, Iranian Kurdish writer and translator.
- Jimmy Goins, 66, American tribal politician, Chairman of the Lumbee Tribe (2004–2010), traffic collision.
- John Hurry, 95, British World War II air force officer.
- Felicia Kentridge, 84, South African lawyer and anti-apartheid activist, progressive supranuclear palsy.
- Harold LeDoux, 88, American cartoonist (Judge Parker).
- Sir Christopher Lee, 93, British actor (Dracula, The Lord of the Rings, Star Wars) and singer, heart failure.
- Michael Oliver, 89, British cardiologist.
- Sean Pappas, 49, South African golfer, heart attack.
- Peter Petherick, 72, New Zealand cricketer (Otago, Wellington, national team).
- Gwilym Prichard, 84, Welsh painter.
- Jane Riga, 41, Estonian mountain climber, avalanche.
- Marco Sartori, 76, Italian Olympic sailor.
- Charles E. Townsend, 82, American Slavicist and linguist.
- Cole Tucker, 61, American pornographic actor, complications from AIDS.
- Vasili Zhupikov, 61, Russian footballer.

=== 8 ===
- Archie Alleyne, 82, Canadian jazz drummer, cancer.
- Paul Bacon, 91, American book and album cover designer and jazz musician.
- Muhammad Sharif Butt, 89, Pakistani Olympic sprinter (1948, 1952, 1956).
- Frank Cappuccino, 86, American boxing referee, Alzheimer's disease.
- Marie-Louise Carven, 105, French fashion designer.
- Thomas Chambers, 83, South African cricketer.
- Aldo da Rosa, 97, Brazilian electrical engineer.
- Eugenia Davitashvili, 65, Russian faith healer.
- Mervin Field, 94, American opinion pollster.
- Jack Grimsley, 89, Australian musical director and composer.
- Jean Gruault, 90, French screenwriter (My American Uncle) and actor.
- Otakar Hořínek, 86, Czech sport shooter, Olympic silver medalist (1956).
- Bill Kindricks, 68, American football player.
- Doug Landry, 51, American football player.
- Valery Levental, 76, Russian theater stage designer.
- Elizabeth Peet McIntosh, 100, American spy, heart attack.
- Lynn Miles, 71, American human rights and Taiwan democracy activist, cancer.
- Tiki Nxumalo, 65, South African actor, asthma attack.
- Ray Preston, 84, Australian rules footballer (South Melbourne).
- Dasaradhi Rangacharya, 86, Indian writer and politician.
- Ivanka Raspopović, 85, Serbian modernist architect.
- David Rotem, 66, Israeli politician, member of the Knesset for Yisrael Beiteinu (2007–2015), cardiac arrest.
- Chea Sim, 81, Cambodian politician, President of the Senate (since 1999) and President of the Cambodian People's Party (since 1991).
- Ray Stits, 93, American aircraft designer.
- Laurie Thompson, 77, British translator.
- Peter van Wijmen, 76, Dutch lawyer, professor and politician, member of the House of Representatives (1998–2002).

=== 9 ===
- Finn Backer, 87, Norwegian Supreme Court judge.
- Larry Eschen, 94, American baseball player (Philadelphia Athletics).
- Randy Howard, 65, American country singer, shot.
- Hemant Kanitkar, 72, Indian Test cricketer.
- Igor Kostin, 78, Romanian-born Ukrainian photographer, took first pictures of Chernobyl disaster, traffic collision.
- James Last, 86, German composer and big band leader.
- Fred Anton Maier, 76, Norwegian speed skater, Olympic champion (1968), cancer.
- Amos Midzi, 62, Zimbabwean politician and diplomat, poisoned.
- Vincent Musetto, 74, American film critic (New York Post), pancreatic cancer.
- Pumpkinhead, 39, American rapper.
- Rainer Riehn, 73, German composer and conductor.
- Alvin J. Salkind, 87, American chemical engineer.
- Sir Peter Williams, 80, New Zealand lawyer, prostate cancer.
- Pedro Zerolo, 55, Venezuelan-born Spanish politician, pancreatic cancer.

=== 10 ===
- David Bellotti, 71, British politician and football executive, MP for Eastbourne (1990–1992), CEO of Brighton & Hove Albion.
- Bonecrusher, 32, New Zealand Thoroughbred racehorse, euthanized following laminitis.
- Robert Chartoff, 81, American film producer (Rocky, Raging Bull, They Shoot Horses, Don't They?), Oscar winner (1977), pancreatic cancer.
- Helen Chasin, 76, American poet.
- Larry Fisher, 65, Canadian convicted murderer (David Milgaard case).
- Johnny Fullam, 75, Irish footballer (Shamrock Rovers).
- Michael Gallagher, 80, British politician and trade unionist, MEP (1979–1984).
- Charles Wyndham Goodwyn, 81, British philatelist, Keeper of the Royal Philatelic Collection (1995–2003).
- Elizabeth Griffin, 70, First Female Barrister in Montserrat.
- Esther Harrison, 69, American politician, member of the Mississippi House of Representatives for the 41st District (since 2001).
- Hugo Höllenreiner, 81, German Sinti Porajmos survivor.
- Wolfgang Jeschke, 78, German science fiction author (The Last Day of Creation).
- Coetie Neethling, 82, South African cricketer.
- Héctor Pérez Plazola, 81, Mexican politician.
- Ray Reidy, 78, Irish priest and hurler (Tipperary).
- Henry E. Riggs, 80, American academic.
- Geoff Robinson, 71, English cricketer.
- Judith St. George, 84, American author (So You Want to Be President?).
- Brian Taylor, 78, English footballer (Walsall, Shrewsbury Town).

=== 11 ===
- Jim Ed Brown, 81, American country singer (The Browns), lung cancer.
- Arshad Chaudhry, 65, Pakistani Olympic bronze medallist field hockey player (1976).
- Ornette Coleman, 85, American saxophonist and free jazz pioneer, cardiac arrest.
- Vittorio De Angelis, 52, Italian voice actor, heart attack.
- Adair Dyer, 82, American attorney.
- Howard Hack, 82, American painter.
- Jack King, 84, American public affairs officer (NASA), heart failure.
- Daniel G. Knowlton, 92, American classicist bookbinder.
- Sarah Kyolaba, 59, Ugandan businesswoman, cancer.
- Bud Lee, 74, American photographer.
- Sebastiano Mannironi, 84, Italian Olympic weightlifter (1956, 1960, 1964).
- Ian McKechnie, 73, Scottish footballer (Hull City).
- Ron Moody, 91, British actor (Oliver!, The Animals of Farthing Wood, EastEnders).
- Mary Mulvihill, 55, Irish science writer.
- David Premack, 89, American psychologist (Premack's principle).
- Dusty Rhodes, 69, American professional wrestler, booker (NWA, WCW, WWE) and promoter, Hall of Fame (2007, 2010), kidney failure.
- James Robertson, 86, Scottish footballer (Brentford).
- Donald Sheldon, 85, American Olympic cyclist.
- John Benjamin Stewart, 90, Canadian politician, MP for Antigonish—Guysborough (1962–1968).
- Charles Williams, 90, British Royal Navy rear admiral.

=== 12 ===
- Nasir al-Wuhayshi, 38, Yemeni Islamist militant, leader of AQAP, airstrike.
- Shoshana Arbeli-Almozlino, 89, Iraqi-born Israeli politician, Minister of Health (1986–1988), Alzheimer's disease.
- Fernando Brant, 68, Brazilian poet and composer, complications of liver transplantation.
- Nek Chand, 90, Indian artist.
- Pierre Dolbeault, 90, French mathematician.
- Rick Ducommun, 62, Canadian actor (The 'Burbs, Scary Movie, Die Hard), complications from diabetes.
- Ric Eaton, 52, American Olympic weightlifter.
- Micol Fontana, 101, Italian fashion designer and entrepreneur (Sorelle Fontana).
- James Gowan, 91, British architect.
- Monica Lewis, 93, American singer and actress (Earthquake), voice of Chiquita Banana (since 1947).
- Frederick Pei Li, 75, Chinese-born American physician, Alzheimer's disease.
- Thomas Mayer, 88, American economist.
- José Messias, 86, Brazilian musician and television personality, multiple organ failure from kidney disease.
- Andrés Mora, 60, Mexican baseball player (Baltimore Orioles, Cleveland Indians), pneumonia.
- Alain Nadaud, 66, French author and diplomat.
- Antoni Pitxot, 81, Spanish painter.
- Alexander Rondeli, 73, Georgian political scientist.
- Jacques Rosay, 66, French test pilot (Airbus).
- Lawrence F. Scalise, 82, American politician.
- Max Spittle, 92, Australian VFL football player (Melbourne).
- Patrick Lennox Tierney, 101, American art historian and Japanologist.
- Sümer Tilmaç, 67, Turkish actor, heart attack.
- Ernest Tomlinson, 90, British composer (Monty Python's Flying Circus).
- Dawn Wofford, 79, British Olympic equestrian.

=== 13 ===
- Big Time Sarah, 62, American blues singer.
- Buddy Boudreaux, 97, American jazz saxophonist and band leader.
- Allan Browne, 70, Australian jazz drummer.
- Tomás Ó Con Cheanainn, 94, Irish historian.
- Darius Dhlomo, 83, South African boxer, footballer and musician.
- Russell J. Donnelly, 85, Canadian physicist.
- Drs. P, 95, Swiss-born Dutch writer, composer and singer.
- Magnus Härenstam, 73, Swedish actor (Sällskapsresan, Göta kanal eller Vem drog ur proppen?, Fem myror är fler än fyra elefanter) and comedian, spinal cancer.
- Junix Inocian, 64, Filipino actor (Sinbad, Mortdecai).
- Sheila Kaul, 100, Indian politician, Governor of Himachal Pradesh (1995–1996).
- Leonard Latkovski Jr., 72, Latvian-born American historian and academic.
- Graham Lord, 72, British biographer (Jeffrey Bernard, Arthur Lowe, Joan Collins) and novelist, liver cancer.
- David Oniya, 30, Nigerian footballer, heart attack.
- Leslie Purvis, 87, New Zealand netball player.
- Sergio Renán, 82, Argentine actor, director and screenwriter (The Truce).
- David C. Richardson, 101, American navy vice admiral.
- Walter Scheib, 61, American chef, White House Executive Chef (1994–2005), drowning.
- Mike Shrimpton, 74, New Zealand cricket player (national team) and coach (women's national team, 2000 Women's World Cup winner).
- Phillip Toyne, 67, Australian environmental and indigenous affairs activist, bowel cancer.
- George Winslow, 69, American child actor (Gentlemen Prefer Blondes, My Pal Gus), heart attack.

=== 14 ===
- George Arthur, 46, Ghanaian football player and coach, cardiac arrest.
- Bob Bedell, 70, American basketball player.
- Hugo Blanco, 74, Venezuelan musician and composer ("Moliendo Café").
- John Carroll, 73, American newspaper editor (Los Angeles Times, The Baltimore Sun), Creutzfeldt–Jakob disease.
- Richard Cotton, 74, Australian geneticist (Human Variome Project).
- Harri Czepuck, 87, German journalist.
- Pasquale Foresi, 85, Italian priest and theologian.
- Anne Nicol Gaylor, 88, American atheism and reproductive rights advocate, co-founder of the Freedom From Religion Foundation, complications from a fall.
- Boris Godjunov, 74, Bulgarian singer.
- Van Dorn Hooker, 93, American architect.
- Phil Judd, 81, English rugby union player (Coventry).
- David Kennedy, 73, American film producer (Dark Shadows), complications following knee replacement surgery.
- Hilary Masters, 87, American author.
- Habibur Rahman Milon, 80, Bangladeshi journalist.
- Peter Prier, 73, German-born American violin maker.
- Edna Shavit, 80, Israeli academic professor (Tel Aviv University) and theatre director.
- Qiao Shi, 90, Chinese politician, Chairman of the National People's Congress.
- Godfrey Steyn, 80, South African cricketer.
- Walter Weller, 75, Austrian conductor and violinist.
- Zito, 82, Brazilian footballer, World Cup-winning team member (1958, 1962), complications of a stroke.

=== 15 ===
- Ali Awni al-Harzi, 29, Tunisian Islamic militant, air strike.
- Wendy Coburn, 51, Canadian artist and academic.
- Wilfried David, 69, Belgian professional cyclist, 1973 Tour de France stage winner, traffic collision.
- Jean Doré, 70, Canadian politician, Mayor of Montreal (1986–1994), pancreatic cancer.
- Gerry Duffy, 84, Irish cricketer.
- Elisabeth Elliot, 88, American missionary and author.
- Alv Jakob Fostervoll, 83, Norwegian politician, Governor of Møre og Romsdal (1977–2002), Minister of Defence (1971–1972, 1973–1976).
- Jeanna Friske, 40, Russian singer (Blestyaschie), brain cancer.
- Daniel W. Gade, 78, American geographer.
- Howard Johnson, 89, English footballer (Sheffield United).
- Kirk Kerkorian, 98, American businessman.
- Magdalena Kopp, 67, German photographer and political activist.
- Walter Kostanski, 91, American businessman and politician.
- Mighty Sam McClain, 72, American soul blues singer, stroke.
- António Marques Mendes, 81, Portuguese lawyer and politician.
- Jesús Moroles, 64, American sculptor, traffic collision.
- Rosalind Rowe, 82, English table tennis player.
- Harry Rowohlt, 70, German author.
- Blaze Starr, 83, American stripper, burlesque comedian and club owner, subject of Blaze, heart failure.
- Wu Kwok Hung, 66, Hong Kong international footballer, laryngeal cancer.

=== 16 ===
- Tariq al-Harzi, 33–34, Tunisian ISIS militant, air strike.
- Carolyne Barry, 71, American dancer and actress (Here Come the Brides).
- Stephen Blauner, 81, American manager and producer.
- Charles Correa, 84, Indian architect.
- Oliver W. Dillard, 88, American major general.
- Poul Jessen, 89, Danish Olympic gymnast.
- Rosalind McGee, 77, American politician, member of the Utah House of Representatives (2003–2008).
- William Pajaud, 89, American artist.
- Greg Parks, 48, Canadian ice hockey player (New York Islanders), Olympic silver medalist (1994).
- Tony Ranasinghe, 77, Sri Lankan actor (Hanthane Kathawa, Duhulu Malak, Ahasin Polawata).
- Bill Sirs, 95, British trade unionist.
- Catharni Stern, 89, British sculptor.
- Jean Vautrin, 82, French writer, filmmaker and critic.

=== 17 ===
- Francisco Domingo Barbosa Da Silveira, 71, Uruguayan Roman Catholic prelate, Bishop of Minas (2004–2009).
- Nicola Badalucco, 86, Italian screenwriter (The Damned, Death in Venice, The Gold Rimmed Glasses) and journalist.
- Per Arne Bjerke, 63, Norwegian journalist and politician.
- Tia Blake, 63, American singer, breast cancer.
- Chang Ch'ung-ho, 101, Chinese-born American poet, calligrapher, and Kunqu opera singer.
- Ron Clarke, 78, Australian long-distance runner, Olympic bronze medallist (1964), Mayor of the Gold Coast (2004–2012), kidney failure.
- John David Crow, 79, American Heisman Trophy-winning football player (Texas A&M, Chicago/St. Louis Cardinals) and coach (Northeast Louisiana).
- Süleyman Demirel, 90, Turkish politician, President (1993–2000), lung infection.
- Nelson Doubleday Jr., 81, American publisher (Doubleday) and Major League Baseball team owner (New York Mets), pneumonia.
- Helen Faison, 90, American educator.
- Emanuil Gyaurov, 80, Bulgarian Olympic basketball player.
- Noah Hutchings, 92, American fundamentalist evangelist and radio personality.
- Jimmy Lee, 62, American investment banker, heart attack.
- Roberto M. Levingston, 95, Argentine politician, President (1970–1971).
- Keith F. Otterbein, 79, American anthropologist.
- Clementa C. Pinckney, 41, American politician and pastor, member of the South Carolina House of Representatives (1997–2000) and Senate (since 2000), shot.
- Madan Mohan Punchhi, 81, Indian jurist, Chief Justice of India (1998).
- Başar Sabuncu, 71, Turkish film director and screenwriter (Şalvar Davası).
- Vlastimir Đuza Stojiljković, 85, Serbian actor.
- Jeralean Talley, 116, American supercentenarian, world's oldest living person.
- Bryan Vaughan, 84, Australian politician and lawyer.
- Gumercindo Yudis, 71, Paraguayan footballer.

=== 18 ===
- Phil Austin, 74, American comedian, writer, and musician (Firesign Theatre), aneurysm.
- Takamitsu Azuma, 81, Japanese architect.
- Monk Bailey, 75, American football player (St. Louis Cardinals, Toronto Argonauts), pancreatic cancer.
- Harold Baquet, 56, American photographer, colon cancer.
- Cooper Blankenship, 86, American politician.
- Edward J. Boling, 95, American academic.
- Sir Patrick Eisdell Moore, 97, New Zealand surgeon.
- Georges Kersaudy, 93–94, French translator.
- Martin Krampen, 86, German semiotician.
- Ko Murobushi, 68, Japanese dancer and choreographer, heart attack.
- Frances Kroll Ring, 99, American secretary and editor.
- Ralph J. Roberts, 95, American businessman, founder of Comcast.
- Jack Rollins, 100, American film producer (Annie Hall, The Purple Rose of Cairo, Irrational Man).
- John M. Stephens, 82, American cameraman (Indiana Jones and the Temple of Doom) and cinematographer (Blacula, Sorcerer).
- Kazuya Tatekabe, 80, Japanese voice actor (Doraemon, Time Bokan, Yatterman), acute respiratory failure.
- Fredrik Fasting Torgersen, 80, Norwegian convicted murderer, complications of pneumonia.
- Jim Vandiver, 75, American racing driver.
- Danny Villanueva, 77, American football player (Los Angeles Rams, Dallas Cowboys) and broadcasting executive, co-founder of Univision, complications from a stroke.
- Allen Weinstein, 77, American historian, Archivist of the United States (2005–2008), pneumonia.

=== 19 ===
- Jack Aeby, 91, American photographer.
- Jagjit Singh Anand, 93, Indian political activist and newspaper editor (Nawan Zamana).
- Harold Battiste, 83, American jazz and R&B composer, arranger and musician (Sam Cooke, Sonny & Cher, Dr. John).
- Brian Bluck, 79, Welsh geologist.
- Jeff Bradstreet, 60, American medical researcher, suicide by gunshot.
- Jim Brailsford, 85, English cricketer (Derbyshire).
- Esther Clenott, 91, American politician, Mayor of Portland, Maine (1989–1990).
- Sir Harold Knight, 95, Australian economist, Governor of the Reserve Bank (1975–1982).
- Len Matarazzo, 86, American baseball player (Philadelphia Athletics).
- Earl Norem, 91, American comic book artist (Silver Surfer, He-Man and the Masters of the Universe).
- Rondal Partridge, 97, American photographer.
- Tukoji Rao Pawar, 51, Indian royal and politician, brain haemorrhage.
- Bruce Poulton, 88, American educator, Chancellor of North Carolina State University (1982–1989).
- Paul Quinn, 77, Australian rugby league player.
- Venkoba Rao, 89, Indian cricketer.
- James Salter, 90, American novelist.
- Xie Tieli, 89, Chinese film director.

=== 20 ===
- Robert K. Abbett, 89, American artist and illustrator.
- Tōru Arakawa, 82, Japanese karateka.
- Robert Arrington, 76, American philosopher.
- William Brantley Aycock, 99, American educator, fall.
- Bob Barry Jr., 58, American sportscaster (KFOR), traffic collision.
- Ian Bradley, 77, British-born New Zealand naval officer and politician.
- Esther Brand, 92, South African athlete, Olympic champion (1952), complications of a fall.
- JoAnn Dean Killingsworth, 91, American actress and dancer (Lullaby of Broadway, Red Garters), first person to play Snow White at Disneyland, cancer.
- François Delapierre, 44, French politician, brain tumour.
- Harold Feinstein, 84, American photographer.
- Elson Floyd, 59, American educator, President of Washington State University (since 2007), complications from colon cancer.
- James Kerzman, 68, American politician, member of the North Dakota House of Representatives (1991–2009), tractor accident.
- Michael Kidson, 85, British schoolmaster (Eton College).
- Katherine O. Musgrave, 95, American academic.
- Robert S. Neuman, 88, American abstract painter and print maker.
- Angelo Niculescu, 93, Romanian football player and manager.
- Gerhard A. Ritter, 86, German historian.
- Doug Rombough, 64, Canadian ice hockey player (New York Islanders, Buffalo Sabres).
- Takanonami Sadahiro, 43, Japanese sumo wrestler and coach, heart failure.
- Miriam Schapiro, 91, Canadian-born American painter, sculptor and printmaker.
- Anthony Sydes, 74, American child actor (Miracle on 34th Street, Cheaper by the Dozen, Johnny Comes Flying Home).
- Takeover Target, 15, Australian Thoroughbred racehorse, euthanised.
- Alberto Varela, 74, Uruguayan Olympic fencer.
- Nan Waddy, 100, Australian psychiatrist.

=== 21 ===
- Agnelo Alves, 83, Brazilian journalist and politician, mayor of Natal (1966–1969), senator from Rio Grande do Norte (1999–2000), esophageal cancer.
- Robert Barritt, 88, Bermudian painter and politician, member of the House of Assembly (1985–1989) and Senate.
- Tseng Chung-ming, 60, Taiwanese politician, cirrhosis and lung cancer.
- Cora Combs, 92, American professional wrestler (NWA), complications from pneumonia.
- Roland Dupree, 89, American dancer and actor (Peter Pan).
- Reg Ellis, 97, Australian cricketer.
- Juan José Estrada, 51, Mexican boxer, WBA bantamweight champion (1988–1989), stabbed.
- Ezkimo, 35, Finnish hip hop musician.
- Dave Godfrey, 76, Canadian novelist and publisher, pancreatic cancer.
- Darryl Hamilton, 50, American baseball player (Milwaukee Brewers, San Francisco Giants, New York Mets), shot.
- John Hoerr, 84, American journalist and historian.
- Roger Ishee, 85, American politician, member of the Mississippi House of Representatives (1997–2012).
- Tony Longo, 53, American actor (Mulholland Drive, Angels in the Outfield, Eraser), heart failure.
- Veijo Meri, 86, Finnish author.
- Frederic Richard Morgenthaler, 82, American electrical engineer.
- Remo Remotti, 90, Italian actor (The Godfather Part III, Nine), playwright, painter, sculptor and poet.
- Jim Rowan, 79, Scottish footballer (Airdrieonians, Celtic, Partick Thistle).
- Alexander Schalck-Golodkowski, 82, East German politician.
- Gunther Schuller, 89, American composer, conductor, historian and jazz musician, leukemia.
- Edith Skouras, 104, American screenwriter (Mr. Moto in Danger Island, Always Goodbye, Manhattan Heartbeat).
- Lynn Steen, 74, American mathematician, heart failure.
- Stanisław Szczepaniak, 80, Polish Olympic biathlete.
- Carl Thompson, 33, Britain's heaviest man.
- Arved Viirlaid, 93, Estonian-Canadian writer.
- Dick Warwick, 87, Canadian ice hockey player (Penticton Vees).
- Wayne Wettlaufer, 71, Canadian politician, member of the Legislative Assembly of Ontario (1995–2003), suspected heart attack.
- Jules Wright, 67, Australian-born British theatre director (Royal Court Theatre), breast cancer.

=== 22 ===
- Laura Antonelli, 73, Italian actress (Malicious, Till Marriage Do Us Part, The Innocent), heart attack.
- Norm Berryman, 42, New Zealand rugby union player (national team), heart attack.
- Carlinhos, 77, Brazilian football player and coach (Flamengo).
- James Carnegie, 3rd Duke of Fife, 85, Scottish nobleman.
- Constantin Cernăianu, 81, Romanian football player and coach.
- Malcolm Colledge, 75, British archaeologist.
- Joseph de Pasquale, 95, American violist.
- Armand DiMele, 75, American psychotherapist and radio broadcaster, complications from pneumonia.
- Jimmy Doyle, 76, Irish hurler (Tipperary).
- Albert Evans, 46, American ballet dancer.
- Don Featherstone, 79, American artist and inventor of the plastic pink flamingo, Lewy body dementia.
- James Horner, 61, American film composer (Titanic, Field of Dreams, Apollo 13), Oscar winner (1998), plane crash.
- Albert Ilemobade, 74, Nigerian academic, asphyxiation.
- Inge Ivarson, 97, Swedish film producer.
- Lyubov Kozyreva, 85, Russian Soviet cross-country skier, Olympic gold medalist (1956).
- David E. Kyvig, 71, American Constitutional scholar, heart attack.
- Buddy Landel, 53, American professional wrestler (SMW, USWA, WCW), injuries sustained in traffic collision.
- Donnie MacLeod, 76, Canadian politician.
- Guy Marchand, 71, French Olympic wrestler.
- Gregorio Morales, 62, Spanish author.
- Robert Sowell, 54, American football player (Miami Dolphins), heart attack.
- Dick Stanfel, 87, American football player (Detroit Lions, Washington Redskins) and coach (New Orleans Saints).
- Tama, 16, Japanese calico cat, stationmaster at Kishi Station, heart failure.
- Ted Whelan, 85, Australian football player (Port Adelaide).
- Gabriele Wohmann, 83, German author.

=== 23 ===
- M. M. Alex, 57, Indian actor (Thoovanathumbikal), heart attack.
- Jack Asher, 88, Scottish shinty player and referee.
- Sanjeet Bedi, Indian actor (Sanjivani).
- Praful Bidwai, 66, Indian journalist.
- Sharon Bryant, 54, American tribal politician, Chief of the Monacan Indian Nation (since 2011), liver cancer.
- Kim Commons, 63, American chess player, complications from a stroke.
- Marujita Díaz, 83, Spanish singer and actress, complications from colon cancer.
- Miguel Facussé Barjum, 90, Honduran businessman and landowner.
- Tommy Hudspeth, 83, American football coach and administrator (Detroit Lions, Toronto Argonauts), cancer.
- Nirmala Joshi, 80, Indian Roman Catholic religious sister, Superior General of the Missionaries of Charity (1997–2009).
- Thé Lau, 62, Dutch singer and guitarist (The Scene), lung cancer.
- Helmuth Lohner, 82, Austrian actor and theatre director.
- Elizabeth MacLennan, 77, Scottish actress, writer and stage practitioner (7:84), leukaemia.
- Donald Max, 58, Tanzanian politician, MP for Geita.
- Ben Mboi, 80, Indonesian politician, Governor of East Nusa Tenggara (1978–1988).
- Domenico Moschella, 67, Canadian politician, Montreal City Councillor.
- Shusei Nagaoka, 78, Japanese illustrator.
- Magali Noël, 83, Turkish-born French actress (Amarcord, La Dolce Vita) and singer.
- Durell Peaden, 69, American politician.
- Pat Peppler, 93, American football coach and executive (Atlanta Falcons).
- Jacques Perrier, 90, French Olympic silver medallist basketball player (1948).
- Harvey Pollack, 93, American sport statistician, last surviving employee from first NBA season.
- Ajit Singh, 74, Indian-born British economist.
- Lonnie Spurrier, 83, American Olympic middle-distance runner (1956).
- Tom Stagg, 92, American judge, U.S. District Court Chief Judge for the Western District of Louisiana (1984–1991).
- Dick Van Patten, 86, American actor (Eight Is Enough, Spaceballs, Robin Hood: Men in Tights), complications from diabetes.
- Sir Chris Woodhead, 68, British educationalist, Chief Inspector for Ofsted (1994–2000), motor neurone disease.

=== 24 ===
- Cristiano Araújo, 29, Brazilian singer and songwriter, traffic collision.
- Dileep Singh Bhuria, 71, Indian politician.
- Mario Biaggi, 97, American politician, member of the U.S. House of Representatives from New York (1969–1988).
- Roger Bordier, 92, French author.
- Walter Browne, 66, Australian-born American chess Grandmaster, six-time U.S. champion.
- Marva Collins, 78, American educator.
- Susan Ahn Cuddy, 100, American Navy officer.
- Orlando Garrido, 91, Cuban Olympic weightlifter.
- Ruqaiya Hasan, 83, Indian linguist.
- João Lopes, 95, Portuguese Olympic equestrian.
- John Joe Nerney, 93, Irish Gaelic footballer (Roscommon).
- Jack Nissenson, 82, Canadian musician.
- John Palmer, 64, British criminal, shot.
- Robert Hugh Pickering, 82, Canadian politician and curler.
- Herbert Polzhuber, 77, Austrian Olympic fencer and modern pentathlete.
- Michelle Watt, 38, Scottish television presenter and interior designer, suicide.
- John Winn, 94, British army officer.

=== 25 ===
- Lou Butera, 78, American pool player, Parkinson's disease.
- Monreko Crittenden, 35, American football player (Columbus Lions).
- Sir Graham Dorey, 82, Guernsey judge, Bailiff of Guernsey (1992–1999).
- Gordon Fearnley, 65, English footballer (Bristol Rovers).
- Graham Gilchrist, 82, Australian football player (Carlton).
- Hal Gould, 95, American photographer and gallery curator.
- Kim Byung-chan, 44, South Korean Olympic weightlifter.
- Gunnar Kulldorff, 87, Swedish statistician.
- Maravene Loeschke, 68, American college administrator (Towson University), adrenal cancer.
- Patrick Macnee, 93, English-American actor (The Avengers, This Is Spinal Tap, A View to a Kill).
- Hélène Monette, 55, Canadian poet, cancer.
- Nerses Bedros XIX Tarmouni, 75, Egyptian-born Armenian Catholic hierarch, Patriarch-Catholicos of Cilicia (since 1999).
- Fred R. Price, 88, American set decorator (Cool Hand Luke).
- Vithal Rao, 85, Indian ghazal singer.
- Jamie Reid, 74, Canadian writer and activist.
- Alejandro Romay, 88, Argentine businessman (Canal 9).
- Alex Scott, 85, Australian-British actor.
- Shojiro Sugiyama, 85, Japanese karateka.
- Jan de Voogd, 90, Dutch politician, member of the House of Representatives (1977–1981).
- Theodore Weesner, 79, American author.
- O'Kelley Whitaker, 88, American prelate, Episcopal Bishop of Central New York.

=== 26 ===
- Paul Ambros, 82, German Hall of Fame ice hockey player (EV Füssen, unified team).
- Pétur Blöndal, 71, Icelandic politician and mathematician.
- Larry Carberry, 79, English footballer (Ipswich Town).
- Damion Cook, 36, American football player (Detroit Lions), heart attack.
- Jerome M. Hughes, 85, American politician, President of the Minnesota Senate (1983–1993).
- David McAlister, 64, British actor (Hollyoaks, Doctor Who), cancer.
- Matti Makkonen, 63, Finnish telecommunications engineer.
- Richard Matt, 49, American convicted murderer and prison escapee, shot.
- Norman Poole, 95, British World War II paratrooper.
- Yevgeny Primakov, 85, Russian politician and diplomat, Prime Minister (1998–1999).
- Gustavo Sainz, 74, Mexican writer.
- Kája Saudek, 80, Czech comics illustrator.
- Kal Segrist, 84, American baseball player (New York Yankees, Baltimore Orioles).
- Shiv Singh, 76, Indian artist.
- Alexa Suelzer, 97, American author, educator and theologian.
- Chris Thompson, 63, American television writer and producer (Laverne & Shirley, Bosom Buddies, Shake It Up!).
- Denis Thwaites, 70, English footballer (Birmingham City), shot.
- David Turner, 91, American rower, Olympic gold medalist (1948).
- Donald Wexler, 89, American architect.
- Charlie Whitehead, 72, American soul singer.

=== 27 ===
- Jane Aaron, 67, American filmmaker and children's book illustrator (Sesame Street, Between the Lions), cancer.
- Zvi Elpeleg, 89, Polish-born Israeli diplomat and academic.
- Elery Hamilton-Smith, 85, Australian academic and conservationist.
- Knut Helle, 84, Norwegian historian.
- Harvey McGregor, 89, British barrister, Warden of New College, Oxford (1985–1996).
- Ghias Mela, 53, Pakistani politician, member of the National Assembly from Sargodha (1997–1999, 2002–2007, 2008–2013), cardiac arrest.
- Boris Shilkov, 87, Russian speed skater, Olympic champion (1956).
- Chris Squire, 67, English bass guitarist (Yes), acute erythroid leukaemia.
- Bronius Vyšniauskas, 92, Lithuanian sculptor.

=== 28 ===
- Ian Allan, 92, British publisher (Ian Allan Publishing).
- Pete Athas, 67, American football player (New York Giants), lymphoma.
- Goran Brajković, 36, Croatian football player, traffic collision.
- Robert C. Broward, 89, American architect.
- Jack Carter, 93, American comedian (Cavalcade of Stars) and actor (Dr. Kildare, Alligator), respiratory failure.
- Carlyle Crockwell, 83, Bermudian football referee.
- Edgar Dawson, 83, British rugby league player.
- Dietrich Haugk, 90, German film director and voice actor.
- Louis Norberg Howard, 86, American mathematician.
- Thomas P. Kennedy, 63, American politician.
- Joe Lobenstein, 88, German-born British politician.
- Liam Ó Murchú, 86, Irish broadcaster (RTÉ).
- Jope Seniloli, 76, Fijian politician, Vice-President (2001–2004).
- Sivuqaq, 21, American walrus and animal actor (50 First Dates), heart failure.
- Todor Slavov, 31, Bulgarian rally driver, race crash.
- Wally Stanowski, 96, Canadian ice hockey player (Toronto Maple Leafs, New York Rangers).
- Ben Wattenberg, 81, American author and political commentator, complications from surgery.
- Bart Williams, 65, American documentary filmmaker and actor (MADtv), cancer.

=== 29 ===
- Hisham Barakat, 64, Egyptian prosecutor, car bombing.
- Forrest Behm, 95, American football player.
- Helge Ole Bergesen, 65, Norwegian political scientist and politician, cancer.
- Ladislav Chudík, 91, Slovak actor (Kawasaki's Rose).
- Bill Cross, 97, British World War II soldier and Legion of honour recipient.
- Willie Daniel, 77, American football player (Pittsburgh Steelers, Los Angeles Rams).
- Rabbe Grönblom, 65, Finnish chief executive, founder of Kotipizza.
- Kauto Star, 15, French-born British-trained racehorse, dual winner of the Cheltenham Gold Cup, euthanized.
- Clayton Kenny, 86, Canadian Olympic boxer (1952).
- Peter Luck, 89, British Olympic wrestler.
- Josef Masopust, 84, Czech football player and manager (Dukla Prague, national team).
- Bryan Nelson, 83, British ornithologist.
- Charles Pasqua, 88, French politician, Minister of the Interior (1986–1988, 1993–1995).
- Mujibar Rahman, 96, Bangladeshi medical scientist.
- Bruce Rowland, 74, British rock drummer (Fairport Convention).
- Jackson Vroman, 34, American-Lebanese basketball player (Phoenix Suns, New Orleans Hornets, Lebanese national team), drowned.

=== 30 ===
- Charles W. Bagnal, 81, American Army lieutenant general.
- Herbert Behrens, 86, American tennis player.
- M. L. Brackett, 81, American football player (Chicago Bears, New York Giants).
- Edward Burnham, 98, English actor (To Sir, with Love, 10 Rillington Place, Doctor Who).
- Frank Butler, 82, South African Olympic water polo player.
- Robert Dewar, 70, English-born American computer scientist (AdaCore), cancer.
- Raymond Dot, 88, French Olympic gymnast.
- Reiner Hanschke, 74, German Olympic hockey player.
- Charles Harbutt, 79, American photographer, emphysema.
- Ronald Kissell, 82, Australian cricketer.
- Eddy Louiss, 74, French jazz organist.
- K. P. P. Nambiar, 86, Indian industrialist.
- Paolo Piffarerio, 90, Italian animator and cartoonist (Alan Ford).
- Arthur Porter, 59, Canadian physician, lung cancer.
- Leonard Starr, 89, American cartoonist (ThunderCats).
- Arthur Thorpe, 82, American physicist.
- Dixie Toelkes, 79, American politician.
- Khosrow Shakeri Zand, 76, Iranian author and human rights activist.
