= Sharon Bryant =

Sharon Bryant may refer to:

- Sharon Bryant (politician) (1961–2015), American tribal politician
- Sharon Bryant (singer) (born 1956), American R&B singer
