= Faison =

Faison may refer to:

== People ==
- Bill Faison (born 1948), American politician
- Donald Faison (born 1974), American actor
- Dorothy Faison (born 1955), American artist
- Frankie Faison (born 1949), American film actor
- George Faison (born 1949), American dancer, choreographer and producer
- Helen Faison (1924–2015), American educator
- Jeremy Faison (born 1976), American politician
- Jordan Faison (born 2004), American football player
- Marcus Faison (born 1978), American basketball player
- Rahsul Faison (born 2000), American football player
- Samson L. Faison (1860–1940), American general

== Other uses ==
- Cesar Faison, a fictional villain on the American daytime drama General Hospital
- Faison, North Carolina, an American town
