= Jules Wright =

Jules Wright may refer to:

- Jules Wright (theatre director)
- Jules Wright (politician)
