= Home (2006 film) =

- theatrical poster
- Directed by: Dawn Scibilia
- Written by: Alan Cooke
- Produced by: Dawn Scibilia; Adam Cooke
- Narrated by: Alan Cooke
- Cinematography: Dawn Scibilia
- Edited by: Dawn Scibilia
- Music by: Dred Scott
- Release date: October 26, 2006
- Running time: 70 minutes
- Country: United States
- Language: English

Home is a 2006 documentary film about New York and the concept of "home" from the perspective of recent Irish Immigrant Alan Cooke, along with a number of notable New York City residents.

== Cast ==
(All persons named appear as themselves.)

- Woody Allen
- David Amram
- Alan Cooke
- Armand DiMele
- Pete Hamill
- Elaine Kaufman
- Fran Lebowitz
- Frank McCourt
- Malachy McCourt
- Alfred Molina
- Mike Myers
- Liam Neeson
- Drew Nieporent
- Rosie Perez
- Colin Quinn
- Susan Sarandon
- Vinny Vella
