= Bart Williams =

Bart Williams may refer to:

- Bart Williams (actor) (1949–2015), American actor and filmmaker
- Bart Williams (rugby league) (born 1976), Australian rugby league player
- Bart Williams (politician) (born 1966), American politician in the Mississippi State Senate

== Surname ==
- Chris Bart-Williams (1974–2023), British footballer
- Patrice Bart-Williams (born 1979), Sierra Leonean-German musician and film-maker
- Gaston Bart-Williams (1938-1990), Sierra Leonean writer and film director

== See also ==
- Bart, a given name
- Williams (disambiguation)
