= Nadaud =

Nadaud is a French surname. Notable people with the surname include:

- Alain Nadaud (1948–2015), French writer and diplomat
- Gustave Nadaud (1820–1893), French songwriter
- Martin Nadaud (1815–1898), French politician
- Noémie Nadaud (born 1995), French acrobatic gymnast
- Serge Nadaud (1906–1995), French actor
- Valérie Nadaud (born 1968), French racewalker
