= No. 139 Squadron RAF =

Defunct flying squadron of the Royal Air Force

No. 139 (Jamaica) Squadron RAF
- Active: 3 July 1918 – 7 Mar 1919; 3 Sept 1936 – 31 Dec 1959; 1 Jan 1962 – 31 Dec 1968
- Country: United Kingdom
- Branch: Royal Air Force
- Nickname: Jamaica
- Mottos: Latin: Si placet necamus ("We destroy at will")

Insignia
- Squadron Heraldry: A fasces in front of a crescent (The fasces is from the badge of No. 28 Squadron RAF to which No. 139 was first attached in 1918)
- Squadron Codes: SY (Apr – Sep 1939); XD (Sep 1939 – Mar 1942, Jun 1942 – 1951)

No. 139 (Jamaica) Squadron RAF was a Royal Air Force Squadron that was fighter unit in World War I and a bomber unit from World War II until the 1960s.

== History ==
=== Formation and World War I ===
No. 139 Squadron Royal Air Force was formed on 3 July 1918 at Villaverla in Italy and was equipped with Bristol F2b fighter aircraft. It was disbanded on 7 March 1919.

=== Reformation and World War II ===
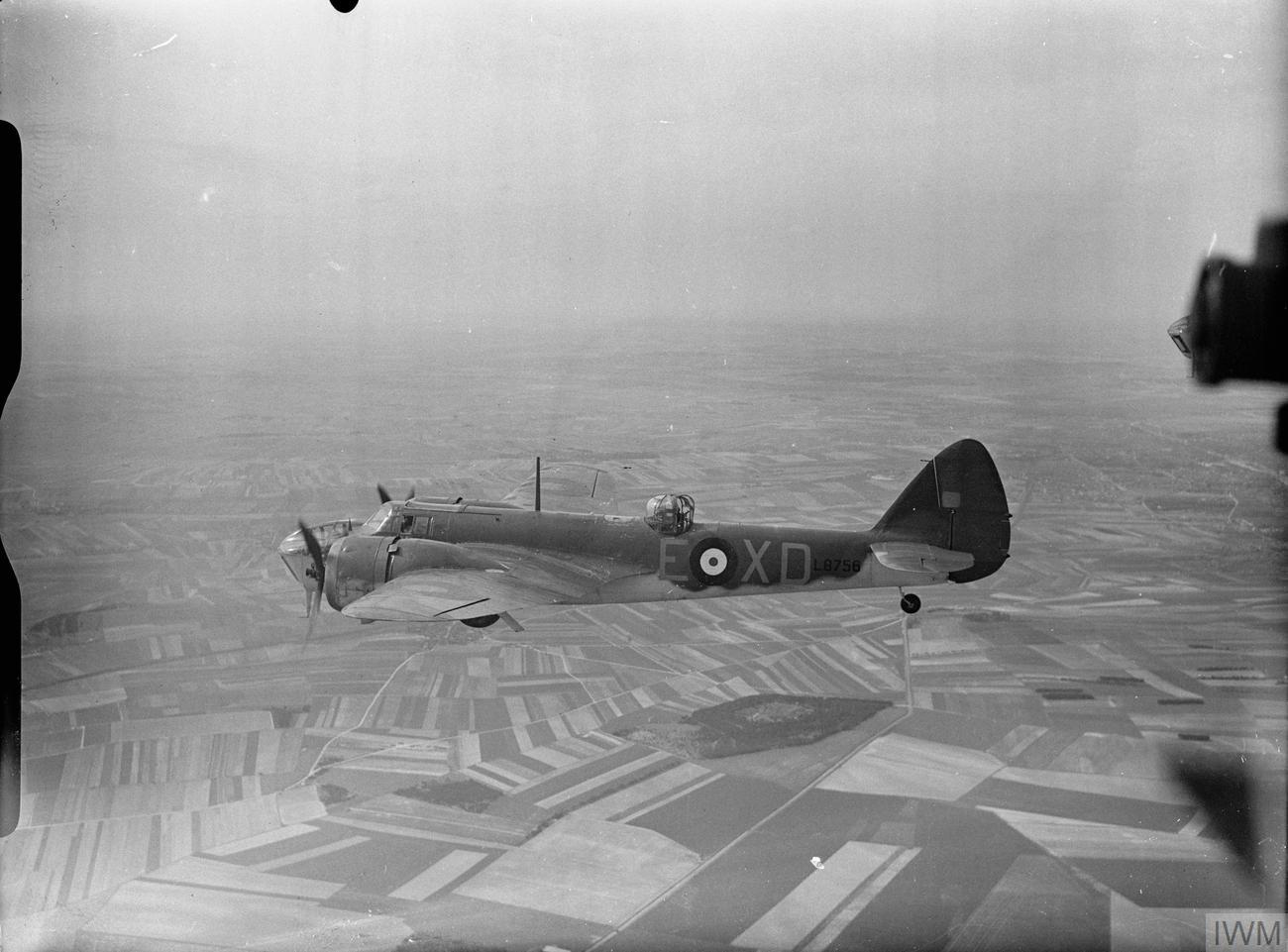
Blenheim IV, L8756/XD-E of No. 139 Squadron, in flight over northern France (Mid-April 1940). This aircraft survived the early stages of the war to be struck off charge in May 1944. A Blenheim bearing the bomber's markings is preserved in the RAF Museum London.

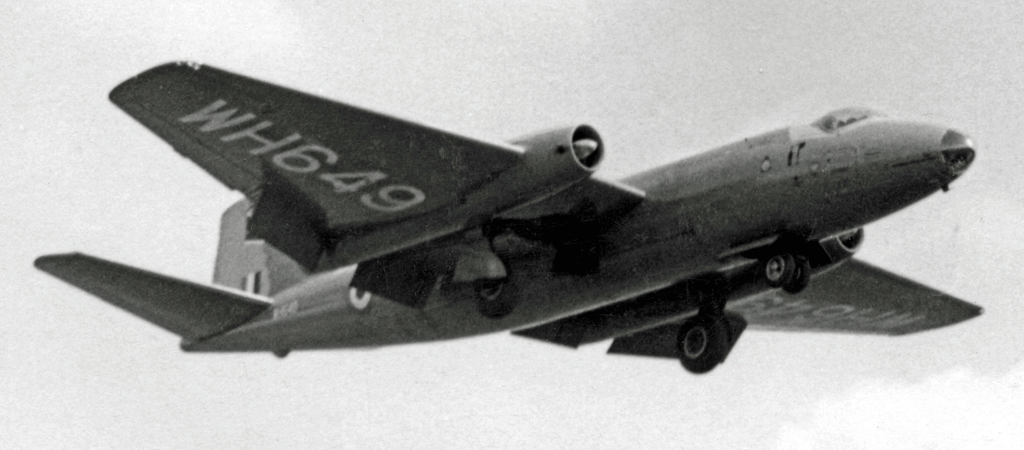
Canberra B.2 of 139 Squadron in 1953

The squadron reformed on 3 September 1936 at Wyton, equipped first with Hawker Hinds and then Bristol Blenheims. On 3 September 1939 a Blenheim IV of the squadron piloted by Andrew McPherson was the first British aircraft to cross the German coast after Britain had declared war on Germany. On 4 September 1939, Nos. 110, 107 and 139 Squadrons led the first RAF air raid of the war against German shipping near Wilhelmshaven. In December 1939, the squadron was moved to Betheniville, France and in May 1940 when based at Plivot it was overrun by the German advance and lost most of its aircraft.

A Jamaican newspaper started a fund to buy bombers for Britain and in recognition of money raised to buy Blenheims it was decided to link Jamaica with a squadron of the Royal Air Force, hence the "Jamaica" tag given to the squadron. In December 1941, the squadron converted to the Lockheed Hudson aircraft, which it operated in Burma until April 1942.

In June 1942, the squadron returned to England and re-equipped with the Blenheim V before quickly switching to the de Havilland Mosquito at Horsham St. Faith. On 3 March, it carried out a daring air raid on the molybdenum processing plant at Knaben in Norway. It is believed that this was one of the raids on which the fictional work 633 Squadron was based. As a result of this raid a number of flight crew received decorations. On 20 March, the squadron lost a number of aircraft a week before the official announcement of the decorations.

It became part of the pathfinder force in July 1943 and remained so for the remainder of the war.

=== Post War ===
The squadron equipped with the English Electric Canberra B2 at RAF Hemswell beginning in November 1952. It disbanded on 31 December 1959 and reformed again at RAF Wittering on 1 January 1962 with the Handley Page Victor B2, before it was finally disbanded on 31 December 1968.

== Aircraft operated ==
Aircraft operated by No. 139 Squadron RAF
From	To	Aircraft	Variant
May 1918	Mar 1919	Bristol F.2	b
Sep 1936	Jul 1937	Hawker Hind	Mk.I
Jul 1937	Sep 1939	Bristol Blenheim	Mk.I
Sep 1939	Dec 1941	Bristol Blenheim	Mk.IV
Dec 1941	Dec 1941	Lockheed Hudson	Mk.III
Feb 1942	Apr 1942	Lockheed Hudson	Mk.III
Feb 1942	Oct 1942	Bristol Blenheim	Mk.V
Sep 1942	Jul 1944	De Havilland Mosquito	B.IV
Sep 1943	Sep 1944	De Havilland Mosquito	B.IX
Feb 1944	Nov 1948	De Havilland Mosquito	B.XVI
Nov 1943	Sep 1945	De Havilland Mosquito	B.XX
Sep 1945	Sep 1948	De Havilland Mosquito	B.XXV
Oct 1948	Dec 1953	De Havilland Mosquito	B.35
Nov 1952	Dec 1959	English Electric Canberra	B.2
Jan 1962	Dec 1968	Handley Page Victor	B.2

== See also ==
- Kenneth Tempest
