= Benha University =

Government university in Benha, Egypt

- Type: Public
- Established: 25 November 1976
- President: Prof. Dr. Gamal ElSaaed
- Location: Benha, Egypt; 30°28′16″N 31°10′54″E
- Campus: Benha, Al Qalyubiyah
- Mascot: N/A
- Website: www.bu.edu.eg

Benha University is an Egyptian government university in the city of Benha, the capital of Al Qalyubiyah Governorate.

== Overview ==
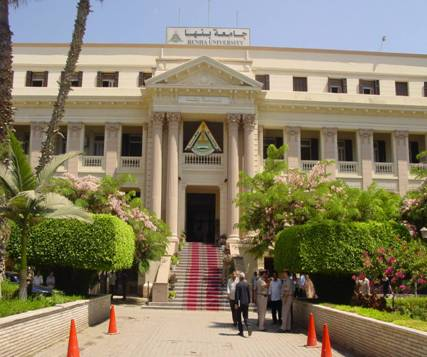
Campus

Founded in 1976, as a branch from Zagazig University in Benha, with the faculties of Commerce, Education, Agriculture of Moshtohor, Engineering of Shobra and Medicine.

In 1981–1982, the faculties of Arts, Science of Benha and Veterinary Medicine of Moshtohor were founded. On 1 August 2005 it became an independent university from Zagazig University. The previous president of the university is Professor Hosam-ed-din Mohammad Al-Attar and then professor Mohamed Safwat Zahran, now Professor Ali Shams Aldeen.

== See also ==
- Education in Egypt
- Egyptian universities
- List of Egyptian universities
- List of universities in Egypt
