= Kabir Karriem =

American politician

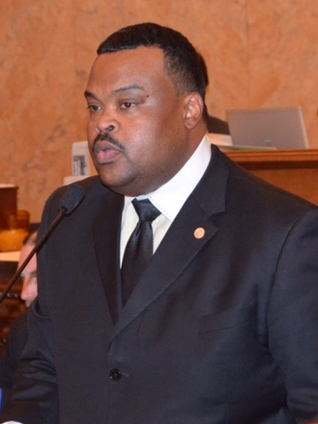

Member of the Mississippi House of Representatives from the 41st district
- Incumbent
- Assumed office January 2016
- Preceded by: Esther Harrison

Personal details
- Born: February 26, 1973 (age 53) Chicago, Illinois, U.S.
- Party: Democratic
- Spouse: Carolyn Turner
- Education: Mississippi State University
- Profession: businessman

Kabir Karriem (born February 26, 1973) is an American politician, a Democratic member of the Mississippi House of Representatives based in the 41st district, since January 2016. Previously, he was a Columbus City Councilman for Ward 5.
