= Banha =

Banha بنها
- City
- Nile Corniche, Banha

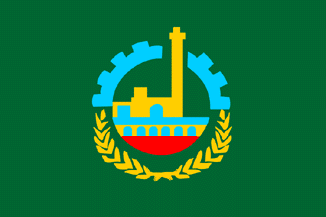
- Flag
- Nickname: The Replica of New York City
- Location within Egypt
- Coordinates: 30°27′39″N 31°11′15″E
- Country: Egypt
- Governorate: Qalyubia

Area
  - City: 10.951 km^{2} (4.228 sq mi)
  - Metro: 180.851 km^{2} (69.827 sq mi)
- Elevation: 17 m (56 ft)

Population (2023)
  - City: 187,469
  - Density: 17,119/km^{2} (44,338/sq mi)
  - Metro: 709,658
  - Metro density: 3,923.99/km^{2} (10,163.1/sq mi)
- Time zone: UTC+2 (EET)
  - Summer (DST): UTC+3 (EEST)
- Area code: (+20) 13

Banha (Arabic: بنها [ˈbænhæ]) is the capital of the Qalyubiyya Governorate in north-eastern Egypt. Between the capital of Cairo and the city of Tanta, Banha is an important transport hub, as rail lines from Cairo to various cities in the Nile Delta pass through it. Benha is a part of Greater Cairo. Banha was founded as a city in 1850.

== Etymology ==
O1 Z1 M1
pr nhꜣ
in hieroglyphs

The city's modern name derives from Banaho (Coptic: ⲡⲁⲛⲁϩⲟ) from Per neha (Ancient Egyptian: pr-nha), which means 'House of Sycamore (Coptic: ⲛⲟⲩϩⲓ)'.

== Geography ==
It is located 48 km (30 mi) north of Cairo. Located on the east bank of the Damietta Branch of the Nile River in the rich farmland of the southern part of the river's delta. Banha is a major junction in the rail network that radiates north from Cairo and it has the 6th biggest train station in Egypt.

The north of Benha is the site of one of several ancient cities called Athribis, the capital of the tenth nome (province) of Lower Egypt in about 1500 BC. The site has never been systematically investigated by archaeologists. Over the years, peasants digging in the area have uncovered a large hoard of silver.

Athribis was the center of worship of the black bull and enjoyed the most popularity during the Roman period of rule in Egypt. Not much still stands of this ancient capital except some remains from the 18th to the 26th Dynasties. Though not a popular tourist destination, there are such sites here as a Greco-Roman cemetery and silver ingots discovered at the Athribis site currently on display at the Egyptian Museum.

About 20 km (12 mi) southwest of Banha is Tall al Yahudiya, the site of Leontopolis, famed for its glazed tiles in ancient times. Population is around 2,479,347 (2005) and total area is 16.105 km^{2}.

=== Climate ===
Köppen-Geiger climate classification system classifies its climate as hot desert (BWh).

Climate data for Benha
Month	Jan	Feb	Mar	Apr	May	Jun	Jul	Aug	Sep	Oct	Nov	Dec	Year
Mean daily maximum °C (°F)	19.2 (66.6)	20.7 (69.3)	23.5 (74.3)	27.8 (82.0)	32 (90)	34.5 (94.1)	34.8 (94.6)	34.6 (94.3)	32.4 (90.3)	30.2 (86.4)	25.5 (77.9)	20.9 (69.6)	28.0 (82.4)
Daily mean °C (°F)	12.7 (54.9)	13.7 (56.7)	16.2 (61.2)	19.7 (67.5)	23.7 (74.7)	26.5 (79.7)	27.6 (81.7)	27.4 (81.3)	25.3 (77.5)	23.1 (73.6)	19.4 (66.9)	14.6 (58.3)	20.8 (69.5)
Mean daily minimum °C (°F)	6.2 (43.2)	6.8 (44.2)	9 (48)	11.7 (53.1)	15.4 (59.7)	18.5 (65.3)	20.4 (68.7)	20.2 (68.4)	18.2 (64.8)	15 (59)	13.3 (55.9)	8.4 (47.1)	13.6 (56.5)
Average precipitation mm (inches)	5 (0.2)	4 (0.2)	3 (0.1)	1 (0.0)	1 (0.0)	0 (0)	0 (0)	0 (0)	0 (0)	2 (0.1)	3 (0.1)	6 (0.2)	25 (0.9)
Source: Climate-Data.org

== Economy ==
Well-irrigated by canals leading off the Delta Barrage, a dam 30 km (19 mi) upstream, the surrounding farmland produces wheat and long-staple cotton. Since ancient times, Banha has been known for the production of attar of roses, an ingredient in perfume. Today it is the center of Egypt's electronics industry.

== Education ==
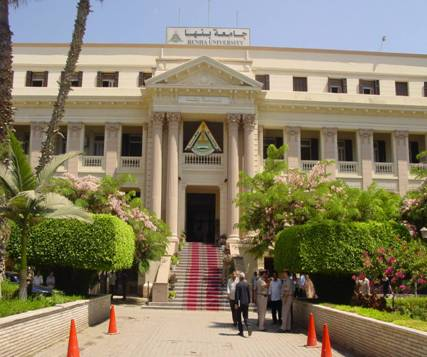
Banha University

=== Banha University ===
Banha University was established in November 1976 as a branch of Zagazig University in the governorate. It became an independent University in 2005 incorporating several facilities and departments with around 60,500 graduates per annum. The Faculty of Medicine is notable for research and management of 2 main hospitals in Banha.

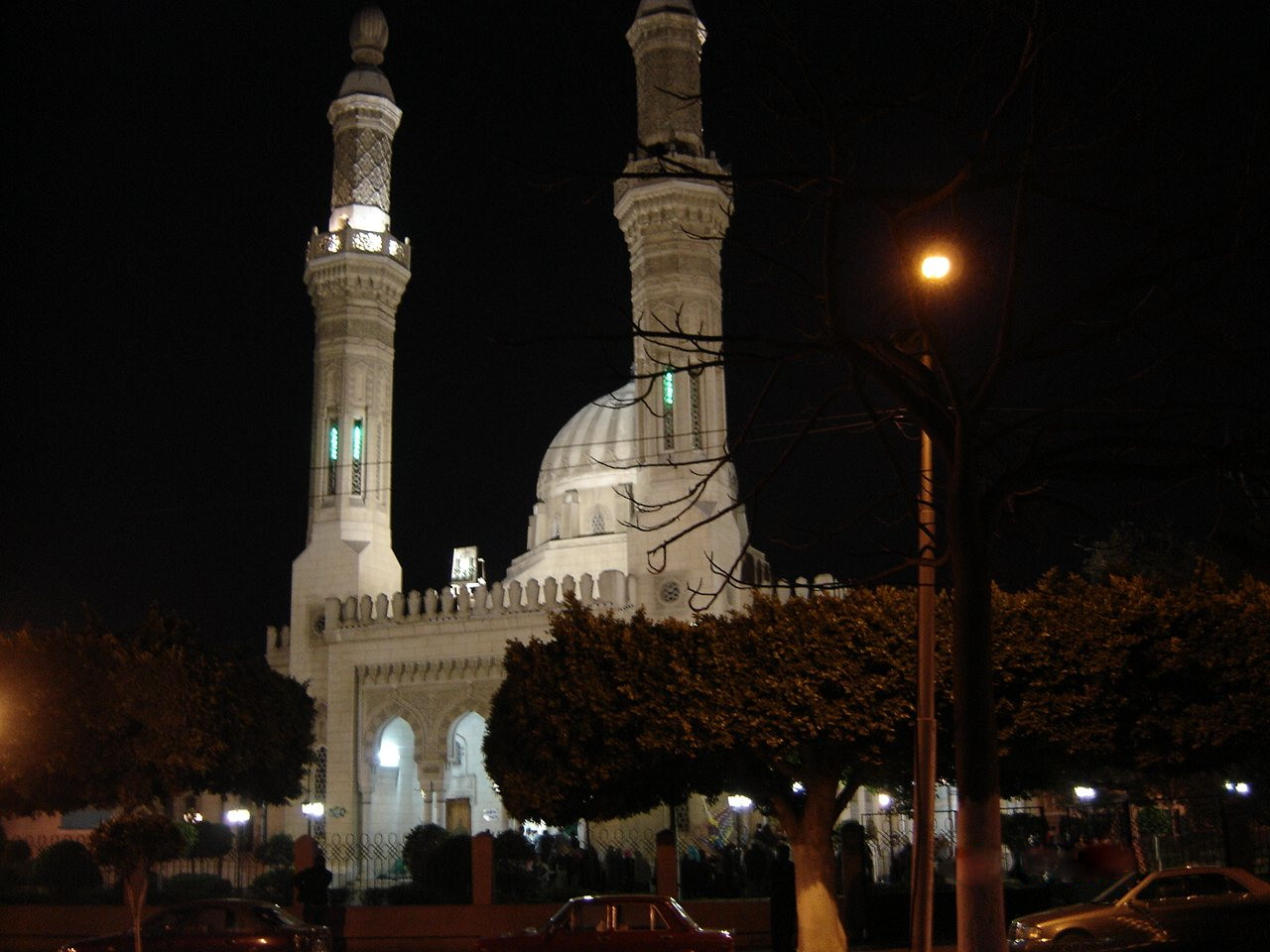
Nasser Mosque, Banha

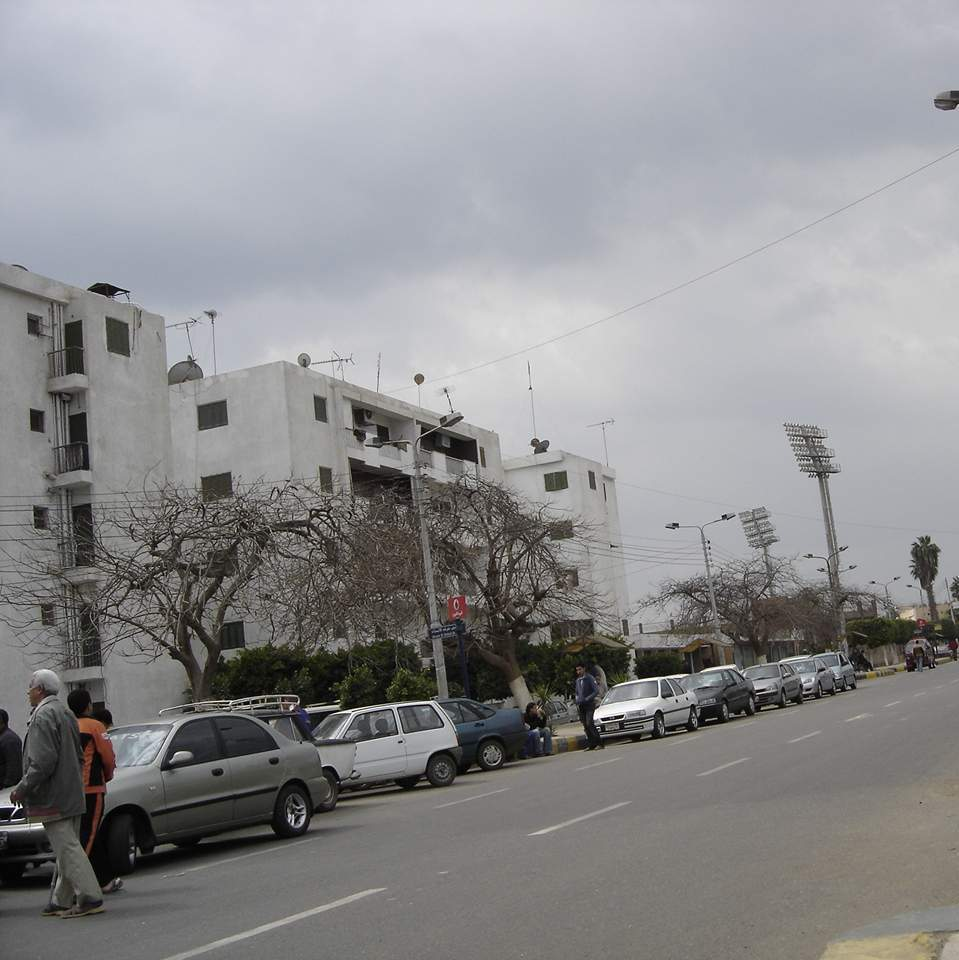
El-Shaheed Farid Nada Street, Benha

== Districts ==
Banha consists of several districts: Bata, Kafr Bata, Al-Vilal, Banha El-Gedida (New Banha), Attrib, El-Manshiyyah, Kafr Manakr (El-Shdiya), West El-Balad (Downtown Area), El-Haras El-Watani, Manshiyyet El-Nur and Hayy El-Zehour(Flowers Suburb), Kafr El-Saraia, Ezbet El-Moraba'a, Kafr El-gazzar, Batta, Ezbet Elmanyawi, Ar Ramla, Ezbet El-Ziraea.

== Notable people ==
- Yahya El Mashad, Egyptian nuclear scientist
- Fouad Qandil, Egyptian novelist
- Ahmed Fathy, footballer
- Ahmed Helmy, actor
- Hussein Al Marsafy, prominent poet and writer during the Isma'il Pasha era, born in Marsafa and died on 1889.
- Saad Samir, footballer
- Gamal El-Araby, Former Minister of Education and Technical Education of Egypt
