= Esther Clenott =

American politician

Esther B. Clenott (March 11, 1924 – June 19, 2015) was an American politician from Maine. Clenott served on the Portland, Maine City Council from 1986 to 1992, including a two one-year terms as mayor (1989 and 1990). She also spent seventeen years as an elected member of the Cumberland County Commission. She was a Democrat.

Prior to serving in elected office, Clenott was a schoolteacher in the Portland Public Schools system. She taught Latin at Lincoln Middle School and Deering High School.

When Clenott was elected to the Portland city Council, she was one of the first women to win election to that body. On the council, Clenott strengthened Portland's relationship with Shinagawa, a sister city.

In May 2000, Clenott was ordered to pay $100,000 in damages after she was among Cumberland County officials named in a lawsuit by Moses Sebunya, who was president of the Maine NAACP at the time. Sebunya sued the county for alleged harassment after he lost job as county jail administrator after he gave a speech criticizing local officials about hate crimes.

She died in 2015 and is buried at Temple Beth El Memorial Park.
