= Fouad Qandil =

Egyptian novelist

Fouad Qandil (1944 – 3 June 2015) was an Egyptian novelist.

== Life and Career ==
He was born in Benha in eastern Egypt and studied philosophy at Cairo University. He was a key figure in Egypt's literary generation of the 1960s. He published more than 40 books, including 18 novels and 12 short story collections. Among his many awards are the Naguib Mahfouz Prize for Best Novel, the State Excellency Award, the State Appreciation Award, and the Tayyib Salih Prize.
