= John Winn =

John Frederick Winn MC (24 March 1921 – 24 June 2015) was a soldier of the British Army who won both a Military Cross and a Silver Star in 1944 in Italy during the Second World War.
