= Esther Harrison =

American politician (1946–2015)

Member of the Mississippi House of Representatives from the 41st district
- In office 2001 – June 10, 2015
- Succeeded by: Kabir Karriem

Personal details
- Born: June 10, 1946 Columbus, Mississippi, U.S.
- Died: June 10, 2015 (aged 69) Memphis, Tennessee, U.S.
- Party: Democratic

Esther Mullin Harrison (June 10, 1946 – June 10, 2015) was an American politician.

Born in Columbus, Mississippi, Harrison went to Mississippi University for Women and Alcorn State University. Harrison was a teacher and an administrator in minority business. She was a member of the Mississippi House of Representatives from the 41st District, serving from 2000 to 2015. She was a member of the Democratic party. She died in office on her 69th birthday in 2015 at a Memphis hospital.
