= Jane Riga =

Estonian mountain climber

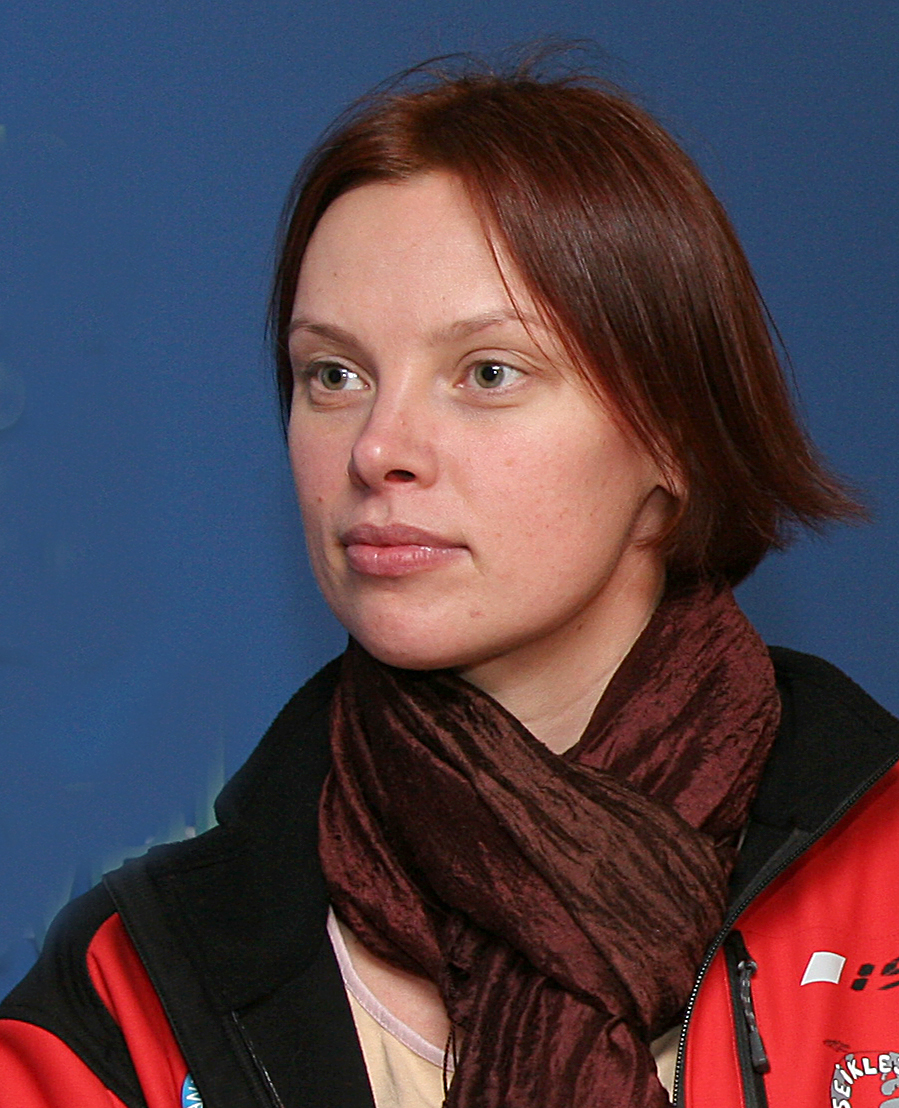
- Born: Jane Käärmann; 11 August 1973; Tartu, then part of Estonian SSR, Soviet Union
- Died: 7 July 2015 (aged 41); Near Huaraz, Peru
- Known for: Mountaineer
- Spouse: Tarmo Riga
- Children: 2

Jane Riga (born Jane Käärmann; 11 August 1973 – 7 June 2015) was an Estonian mountain climber. She died after an avalanche knocked her into 65-foot deep crack in the Cordillera Blanca range in the Andes of northern Peru.

== Early life ==
Jane Riga was born as Jane Käärmann in Tartu. She was a graduate of the Tallinn University, majoring in English. After graduation, she worked as an interpreter and a guide and started hiking in 1989. In 2007, she was the first Estonian to scale the Vinson Massif in Antarctica. In 2008 and 2009, with her husband Tarmo Riga, she managed to climb several peaks in Ecuador and Argentina that no other Estonians had climbed.

== Notable climbs ==
- 2007 ascended Vinson Massif (4892m, the highest peak of the continent of Antarctica) on the first Estonian Antarctica expedition
- 2008 ascended five volcanoes in Ecuador Andes: Iliniza Norte (5126m), Cotopaxi (5897m), and Chimborazo (6268m), as well as the easier routes of Pasachoa (4199m) and Corazon(4791m)
- 2009 ascended La Ramada (6410m) and Mercedario (6770m) in Central Andes, Argentina
- 2011 ascended Nun (7135m) in Punjab Himalaya, India

== Death ==
In 2015, a four-member group, including Jane Riga, her husband Tarmo Riga (:et), Allan Valge, and Annemai Märtson attempted to climb the Huascaran National Reserve Ancash, Peru (Andes Mountains). After about a week into the climb, the group was crossing an ice bridge when Tarmo, Allan and Jane fell through the bridge. Thus starting an avalanche which caused the bridge to then fall on top of the three mountaineers. Märtson was the only one rescued because, while she also fell down the crevice, she was not encased in the ice and snow in the same way as the other three climbers, who were eventually found under four meters of ice and snow. Rescue workers arrived to the scene 12 hours after the initial fall. They were caught at about 300 feet from the summit (approx. elevation 19,400 feet).
