= Kenneth Tempest =

British Royal Air Force officer (1922–2015)

- Kenneth Tempest
- Born: 9 April 1922; Cawnpore, India
- Died: 2 June 2015 (aged 93)
- Military career
- Allegiance: United Kingdom
- Branch: Royal Air Force
- Rank: Flight lieutenant
- Conflicts: Second World War
- Awards: Distinguished Flying Cross

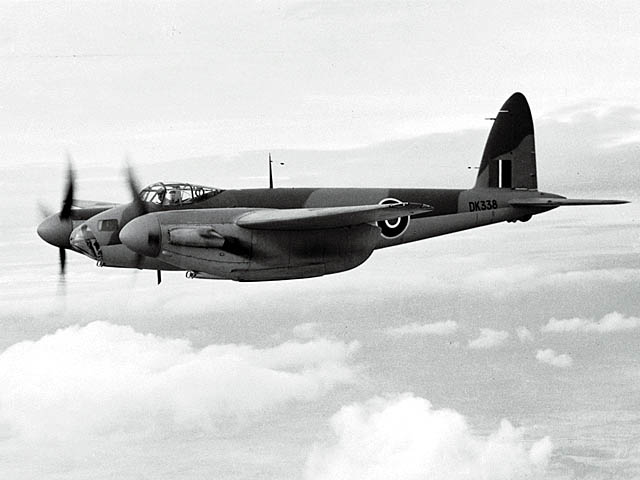
De Havilland Mosquito

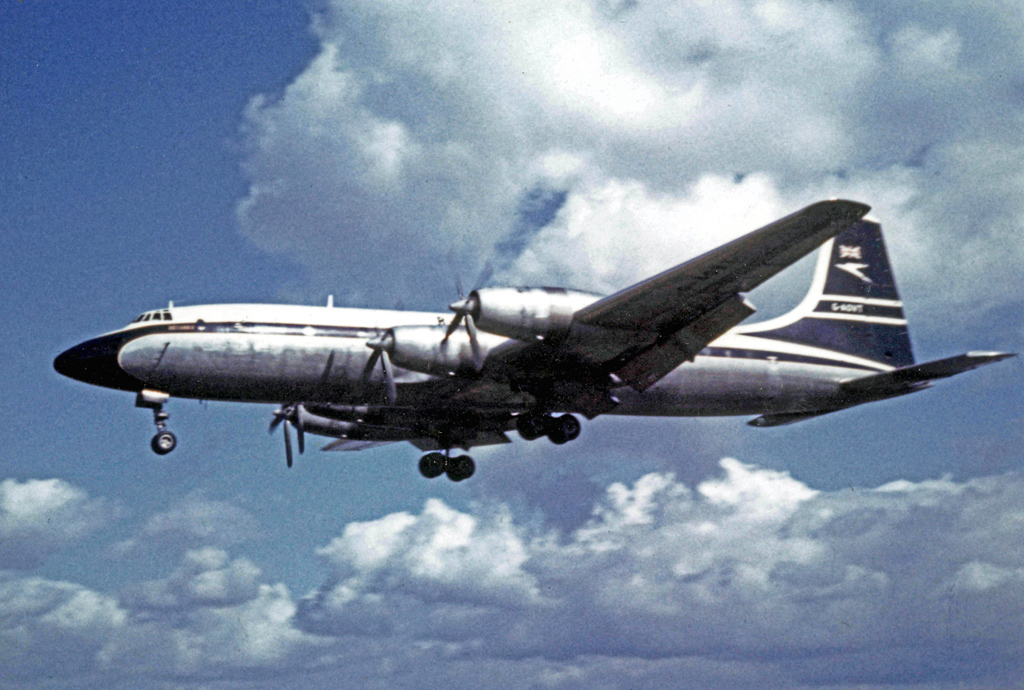
Bristol Britannia of BOAC

Kenneth Tempest, DFC (9 April 1922 – 2 June 2015) was a Royal Air Force navigator with No. 139 Squadron RAF during the Second World War flying Mosquitos. He was awarded the Distinguished Flying Cross for his service. Following the war he trained as a pilot and flew with BOAC in the Bristol Britannia and the VC10.

== Early life ==
Kenneth Tempest was born in Cawnpore (now Kanpur), India, on 9 April 1922. He was educated at Keighley Boys' Grammar School and his first job was with Lloyds Bank which he quickly left to join the Royal Air Force.

== Second World War ==
Tempest first trained as a navigator in Florida under the joint US/UK training programme. On returning to England he was posted to the non-military BOAC (British Overseas Aircraft Corporation) at Poole where he trained on flying boats and from 1943 he was the navigator on the Boeing 314 A Clipper in which he flew hundreds of transatlantic flights. He was posted to BOAC's station in Baltimore and was the navigator on several flights in support of the Quebec Conference of 1943.

Tempest returned to the Royal Air Force in mid 1944 where he joined No. 139 Squadron RAF and trained with the Light Night Striking Force, part of the Pathfinder Force flying Mosquitos. The Pathfinders staged many raids on Berlin and other German cities, dropping markers to enable the larger bombers to find their targets and making single-bomb raids on other targets to confuse and harass the enemy. In all, Tempest completed 43 operations for the LNSF and in May 1945 took part in Bomber Command's last operation of the war. He was awarded the Distinguished Flying Cross not long after.

== Post-war career ==
Following the war, Tempest returned to BOAC where he flew converted bombers from Baltimore and Canada. In 1951 he began to train as a pilot by which time he had completed 237 transatlantic flights. At BOAC he flew first the Bristol Britannia, converting to the VC10 in 1964. In 1965, he was the pilot who flew Queen Elizabeth and the Duke of Edinburgh to Addis Ababa and back. Tempest retired in 1975 by which time he had clocked up more than 14,000 hours' flying time.

Tempest married Norma Clayton in 1957. They had one child. Tempest had a child from a previous marriage, who predeceased him.

Tempest died in hospital on 2 June 2015.
