= Dick Warwick =

Canadian ice hockey player

- Born: April 28, 1928 Regina, Saskatchewan, Canada
- Died: June 21, 2015 (aged 87) Victoria, British Columbia, Canada
- Height: 5 ft 6 in (168 cm)
- Weight: 145 lb (66 kg; 10 st 5 lb)
- Position: Center
- Shot: Left
- Played for: Penticton Vees
- National team: Canada
- Playing career: 1945–1960
Medal record
Men's ice hockey
Gold medal – first place	1955 West Germany	Ice hockey

Richard McAllister Warwick (April 25, 1927 – June 21, 2015) was a Canadian ice hockey player with the Penticton Vees. He won a gold medal at the 1955 World Ice Hockey Championships in West Germany. He also played for the New Westminster Royals, Nanaimo Clippers, Tacoma Rockets, Trail Smoke Eaters, Kamloops Chiefs, Kitchener-Waterloo Dutchmen.
