= Tariq al-Harzi =

Tunisian Islamist terrorist (1982 – 2015)

- Born: 3 May 1982; Tunis, Tunisia
- Died: 16 June 2015 (aged 33); Al-Shaddadah, Syria
- Cause of death: Death by airstrike
- Other name: Abu Umar al-Tunisi

Tariq bin al-Tahar bin al-Falih al-'Awni al-Harzi (3 May 1982 – 16 June 2015), also known as Abu Umar al-Tunisi, was a Tunisian man and senior leader of the Islamic State.

== History ==
He was born either on 3 May 1982, in Tunis, Tunisia.

According to the US government, he was one of first militants to join the Islamic State, traveling to Iraq as a foreign fighter after the US invasion of the country.

In October 2007, IS personnel records were captured by coalition forces in a raid near Sinjar. These records contain a mention of Abu Umar al-Tunisi. A note mentions that he was a soldier, had received medical treatment for an unspecified injury and was returning to his station in Abu Ghraib, Iraq.

== Syria ==
=== 2013 ===
Since 2013, he was recruiting and facilitating the travel of fighters for IS. He was named IS's emir for the Syria–Turkey border and he received new foreign fighter recruits and provided them light weapons training before sending them to Syria. He arranged the movement of Europeans to Turkey and on to Syria. He and other IS border officials assisted foreign fighters from the United Kingdom, Albania and Denmark.

In the middle of 2013, he worked with Abu Muhammad al-Adnani to move an individual to a training camp in Deir ez-Zor, Syria. Also around this time, he was a leader of foreign operations for IS and had ordered individuals to plan a large operation targeting a United Nations Interim Force in Lebanon commander.

He also worked to help raise funds from Gulf-based donors for IS. In September 2013, he arranged for IS to receive approximately $2 million from a Qatar-based IS financier, who required that the funds were used for military operations only. The Qatar financier also requested Abu Umar's help with funding efforts in Qatar.

In late 2013, he was IS's amir of suicide bombers and a central part of the network that controlled suicide and vehicle-borne improvised explosive device (VBIED) attacks in Iraq. As part of this role, he moved IS members from Syria into Iraq. In October 2013, he requested suicide bombers for operations in Iraq from a Syria-based associate. He also worked with his brother to procure and ship weapons from Libya to Syria for IS.

=== 2014 ===
In early 2014, he was involved in recruiting North Africans to IS.

== US and UN sanctions ==
On September 24, 2014, he was designated by the US Treasury Department as a Specially Designated Global Terrorist with a long list of alternate names and several alternative birthdates. His Tunisian passport number was Z-050399. On May 5, 2015, The U.S. Department of State's Rewards for Justice Program offered a reward of US$3 million for information leading to his capture.

== Death ==
Tariq al-Harzi was killed in a US drone strike at Shaddadi in north-eastern Syria on 16 June 2015. His brother Ali Awni al-Harzi was killed the previous day in a US airstrike on Mosul, Iraq.

An article in the Islamic State's newspaper al-Naba confirms that Tariq al-Harzi was responsible for suicide attacks, referring to him as "the good brother and inciter of the istishhadiyin (martyrdom seekers)" and gives his nom de guerre as Abu ‘Umar at-Tunisi. It also confirms his death by saying 'Rahimahullah' after his name.

== Family ==
His younger brother Ali Awni al-Harzi was also an Islamic militant and member of the Islamic State. He was killed a day before the death of his older brother. Their father's name is Taher Ouni Harzi while their mother's name is Borkana Bedairia.
