= Leslie Purvis =

New Zealand netball player (1927–2015)

Personal information
- Full name: Olive Leslie Purvis (Née: Black)
- Born: 14 August 1927 Greymouth, New Zealand
- Died: 13 June 2015 (aged 87) Cambridge, New Zealand
- Height: 1.78 m (5 ft 10 in)
- Spouse: Stewart Purvis (died 2014)
- Children: 5
- School: Gisborne High School
- University: Canterbury University College

Netball career
- Playing position: GD
Years	National team	Caps
1948	New Zealand	1

Olive Leslie Purvis (née Black; 14 August 1927 – 13 June 2015) was a New Zealand netball player. She played as goal defence in the New Zealand team in the second Test match against the touring Australian team in 1948.

== Early life ==
Purvis was born Olive Leslie Black in Greymouth on 14 August 1927, the daughter of schoolteacher Henry William Robert Black and Bernadena Isabel Black (née Leslie). She was educated at Te Araroa District High School, where her father was headmaster, and then Gisborne High School where she was senior tennis champion. She went on to study geography at Canterbury University College from 1945, completing a Bachelor of Arts degree and gaining a senior scholarship in 1947, and graduating Master of Arts with second-class honours in 1950. Black was head student at Helen Connon Hall, and served on the executive of the Canterbury students' association.

== Netball career ==
Black first played provincial representative netball for Poverty Bay in 1944. She represented Canterbury University during her studies there, and captained both the Canterbury University and New Zealand Universities sides in 1947 and 1948.

In 1947, Black was vice-captain of the Canterbury provincial team, winning the national championships in Nelson. At the conclusion of the tournament, Black was included in the South Island team that was defeated by the North Island 17–12 in the interisland match.

In 1948, Black played for the New Zealand national team in the second Test against the touring Australian team in New Plymouth. The Australian team was victorious, winning 44–13, although Black was reported to have "intercepted well" in defence. The match was the only occasion on which Black represented New Zealand, because the New Zealand side for the three-Test series was selected on a regional basis, and New Zealand did not play another international game until 1960.

== Later life ==
Black married George Stewart Purvis, a long-serving general practitioner in Papakura. The couple had five children and were both involved in many local community organisations. Leslie Purvis died in Cambridge on 13 June 2015, aged 87, having been predeceased by her husband six months earlier, in December 2014.
