= Venkoba Rao =

Indian cricketer (1925–2015)

Personal information
- Full name: VR Venkoba Rao
- Born: 15 August 1925
- Died: 19 June 2015 (aged 89); United States of America
- Source: ESPNcricinfo, 18 July 2016

Venkoba Rao (15 August 1925 – 19 June 2015) was an Indian cricketer. He played two first-class matches for Mysore between 1945 and 1948.
