= Henry T. Sampson =

American engineer and film historian (1934–2015)

- Born: Henry Thomas Sampson Jr. April 22, 1934; Jackson, Mississippi
- Died: June 4, 2015 (aged 81); Stockton, California
- Known for: Creating the gamma-electric cell

Henry Thomas Sampson Jr. (April 22, 1934 – June 4, 2015) was an American engineer, inventor and film historian who created the gamma-electric cell in 1971 — a device with the main goal of generating auxiliary power from the shielding of a nuclear reactor. He wrote books Blacks in Black and White: A Source Book on Black Films, The Ghost Walks: A Chronological History of Blacks in Show Business, 1865-1910, and the two volume Singin' on the Ether Waves: a Chronological History of African Americans in Radio and Television Programming, 1925–1955.

== Early life ==
Henry Thomas Sampson was born on April 22, 1934, in Jackson, Mississippi, to Henry T. Sampson Sr. and Esther B. (Ellis) Sampson. He graduated from Jackson's Lanier High School in 1951. He then attended Morehouse College in Atlanta, before transferring to Purdue University, where he became a member of the Omega Psi Phi fraternity. He received a Bachelor's degree in chemical engineering from Purdue University in 1956. He graduated with an MS degree in engineering from the University of California, Los Angeles, in 1961. Sampson also received an MS in Nuclear Engineering from the University of Illinois Urbana-Champaign in 1965, and his PhD in 1967. He was the first African American to earn a PhD. in nuclear engineering in the United States.

== Early career ==
He was a member of the United States Navy from 1962 until 1964. Sampson was employed as a chemical at the Naval Air Weapons Station China Lake U.S. Naval Weapons Center, China Lake California, in the area of high energy solid propellants and case bonding materials for solid rocket motors. Sampson also served as the Director of Mission Development or Operations of the Space Test Program at the Aerospace Corporation in El Segundo, California. During his time with the Aerospace Corporation, Sampson led an engineering staff in the development and operation of several space satellites.

== Career ==
As the director of Aerospace Corporation, he worked extensively in the evaluation of various power sources for creating high-power satellite programs including nuclear, photovoltaic, and magnetohydrodynamic. He developed a simulation program performance metric for hybrid automobiles and city buses. The Air Force needed technical support from Sampson and his group to launch 13 low Earth-orbit satellites. Sampson was part of the launch readiness review team for Milstar in its first launch, which serves to provide secure communications worldwide for the U.S. military during wartime.

== Patents ==
His patents included a binder system for propellants and explosives and a case bonding system for cast composite propellants. Both inventions are related to solid rocket motors.

On July 6, 1963, he was awarded a patent, with George H. Miley, for a variation of the gamma-electrical cell, a device that produces a high voltage from radiation sources, primarily gamma radiation, with proposed goals of generating auxiliary power from the shielding of a nuclear reactor. Additionally, the patent cites the cell's function as a detector with self-power and construction cost advantages over previous detectors.

== Film historian ==
In addition to his career as an inventor, Sampson was a noted film historian. He wrote the book Blacks in Black and White: A Source Book on Black Films, which examines often overlooked African-American film makers from the first half of the 20th century. In addition, he authored The Ghost Walks: A Chronological History of Blacks in Show Business, 1865-1910. Sampson produced documentary films on African-American film makers. In 2005, he published Singin' on the Ether Waves: a Chronological History of African Americans in Radio and Television Programming, 1925–1955 (two vols, 1270 pages), Lanham, Maryland, and Oxford, UK: Scarecrow Press, 2005.

In 2011 Sampson donated his considerable collection of historical film memorabilia to Jackson State University. The collection is housed in the H.T. Sampson Library, named for his father, H. T. Sampson Sr., former executive dean of Jackson State University.

== Awards and honors ==
From 1964 to 1967, Sampson was the recipient of a United States Atomic Energy Commission Award for excellent service at the U.S. Naval Weapons Center.

Sampson was also the recipient of these awards:

- "Outstanding Contributions in the Field of Engineering" by the LA Council of Black Professional Engineers (1983)
- "Robert H. Herndon Black Image Award" by Aerospace Corporation (1983)
- "George Washington Carver Renaissance Inventors Award" (2008)
- "Alumni Award for Distinguished Service" by University of Illinois College of Engineering (2009)
