= Ali Awni al-Harzi =

Tunisian Islamic militant

Ali bin al-Tahar bin al-Falih al-'Awni al-Harzi (9 March 1986 – 15 June 2015), known as Abu Zubayr al-Tunisi, was a Tunisian Islamic militant and a senior leader in the Islamic State. He was also a suspect in the 2012 Benghazi attack.

== History ==
=== Early life ===
He was born on 9 March 1986 in either Ariana or Tunis, Tunisia.

=== Islamic militancy ===
He was a member of Ansar al-Sharia (Tunisia) and active in recruitment of foreign fighters as well as being involved in arms smuggling. He was detained and sentenced to 30 months imprisonment for planning terrorist acts in 2005 in Tunisia.

In October 2012 he was arrested in Turkey and extradited to Tunisia on terrorism charges and possible links to the attack on the U.S. consulate in Benghazi. He was making his way to Syria at the time.

In December 2012, Federal Bureau of Investigation agents questioned him about the Benghazi attack. Ansar al-Sharia (Tunisia) stalked the agents during their time in Tunisia. The group posted their pictures online while condemning the Tunisian government for allowing the FBI to interview Harzi. In the same month, the group released a video discussing Harzi's case and confirming the FBI's role in his questioning.

On 8 January 2013, he was released because of a lack of evidence. Ansar al-Sharia posted a video celebrating Harzi's release. Harzi spoke in the video which showed him being congratulated by his fellow jihadists.

=== US and UN sanctions ===
He was sanctioned by the United States Department of the Treasury on 14 April 2015.

He was listed by the United Nations Security Council on 10 April 2015.

== Death ==
He was killed in an airstrike in Mosul, Iraq on 15 June 2015.

== Family ==
His brother, Tariq bin al-Tahar bin al-Falih al-'Awni al-Harzi, known as Abu Umar al-Tunisi, was also an Islamic militant with the Islamic State. He was killed in Syria on 16 June 2015, the day after the death of his younger brother. Their father's name is Taher Ouni Harzi while their mother's name is Borkana Bedairia.
