= Paolo Tullio =

Italian chef and writer (1949–2015)

- Born: 1949; Lazio, Italy
- Died: 5 June 2015 (aged 65–66); Dublin, Ireland
- Occupation: Writer (and former head chef)
- Known for: Michelin-starred Armstrong's Barn and culinary articles

Paolo Luigi Mario Tullio (pronounced [pa.o.lo tul.ljo]; 1949 – 5 June 2015) was a writer and a Michelin-starred head chef of the former restaurant Armstrong's Barn in Annamoe, County Wicklow.

Tullio came to Ireland in 1968 to study English, arts and philosophy at Trinity College, where he obtained an MA. After his study he held several jobs, working as a clinical psychologist in St. Brendan's Hospital, an interpreter and as a cattle-agent.

== Armstrong's Barn ==
In 1977 Tullio took over Armstrong's Barn, serving food in a traditional Irish style. The restaurant closed in 1988. Tullio did not sell the building when he closed the restaurant, instead he changed it into a recording studio. It was not a big hit so he held several other jobs to pay the bills such as acting as a voice-over artist for commercials. After the demise of the studio, he renovated the building and turned it into a house.

Tullio sold "Annaglen", the dwelling house attached to Armstrong's Barn, and moved into Armstrong's Barn itself. Before selling off Armstrong's Barn in 2003, he built a smaller house in a field close by.

He received several culinary awards for his cooking. In 1978 Armstrong's Barn was awarded one Michelin star. The Michelin Guide awarded the restaurant the "Red M", indicating "good food at a reasonable price", in 1980 and 1981.

== Activities ==
- founder and writer for foodandwine.net
- restaurant reviewer and wine correspondent for the Irish Independent
- writes articles on life-style and travel for Food and Wine Magazine
- resident critic on RTÉ's show The Restaurant
- co-owner and writer for TasteofIreland.com
- presenter on the radio programme Sean Moncrieff on Newstalk

== Personal ==
Tullio married watercolour artist Susan Morley in 1975 after they met each other at Trinity College; they had two children, but separated in 2004. He died in June 2015 at the age of 65. Tullio was close friends with singer Chris de Burgh whom he also met at Trinity College. Later they even became brothers-in-law when de Burgh married Susan's sister, Diane, in 1978.

== Awards ==
- Michelin star 1978
- Michelin's Red M 1980 and 1981
- named Critic of The Year by "Hotel and Catering Review".

== Film and television ==
- 1997: The Butcher Boy as "Mr. Caffolla"
- 1997: How to Cheat in the Leaving Certificate as Athlone Flat Landlord
- 2001: The Tailor of Panama – Panamanian Businessman
- 2006: The Tiger's Tail as "Patrick Le Say"

Tullio appeared on The Late Late Show (2004), The Podge and Rodge Show (2006) and Tubridy Tonight (2007). He was a judge on each season of The Restaurant. He presented the RTÉ-series North of Naples, South of Rome, adapted from his book with the same name.

== Books ==
- North of Naples, South of Rome (1994)
- Mushroom.Man (1998)
- Roly's Café & Bakery (2009)
- Paolo Tullio Cooks Italian: Italian Recipes (2010)
