= Norman Poole =

Norman Harry Poole MC (9 April 1920 – 26 June 2015) was a British soldier who was one of the first allied soldiers to land on occupied territory on D-Day in 1944. Poole won the Military Cross for his actions on that day and subsequently as he evaded capture by the enemy for six weeks.

Poole was born in Winchester and educated at Peter Symonds College. He joined the Hampshire Regiment in 1940, became an instructor at the Parachute Regiment Battle School, and transferred to the 1st Special Air Service Regiment in 1943.
