= Louis Norberg Howard =

American mathematician

Louis Norberg Howard (March 12, 1929 – June 28, 2015) was an American mathematician who was professor emeritus of mathematics at the Massachusetts Institute of Technology. He contributed to a broad range of subjects, including hydrodynamic stability and geophysical flows. He made a number of key advances in our understanding of turbulent convection, flows in Hele-Shaw cells, salt-finger zones, rotating flows, and reaction–diffusion equations.
