= Andrew V. Granato =

American theoretical physicist

Andrew Vincent Granato (9 May 1926, in Cleveland, Ohio – 3 June 2015, in Urbana, Illinois) was an American theoretical physicist, specializing in condensed matter physics. He is known for the Granato-Lücke formula.

Granato was, during WW II, in the Naval Reserves while attending the University of Rochester. He received his bachelor's degree in 1948 and his M.S. in 1950 from Rensselaer Polytechnic Institute and his Ph.D. in 1955 under Kurt Lücke in applied mathematics from Brown University. In 1955–1957 he was a research associate at Brown. He became in 1957 an assistant professor, in 1961 an associate professor, and in 1964 a full professor of physics at the University of Illinois. In 1959–1961 he was a visiting professor at Aachen, where he held a Guggenheim Fellowship for the academic year 1959–1960.

He was chairman of the International Conference on Internal Friction and Ultrasonic Attenuation held in Urbana, Ill. (1985). In 1987-88, he was the Bernd T. Matthias visiting scholar at the Los Alamos National Laboratory and guest research fellow at the Institute for Industrial Science at the University of Tokyo. His research included such topics as crystalline materials (dislocations), impurity and interstitial atoms, and behavior of glassy materials and the glass transition (regarded as one of the most important problems still to be fully resolved in condensed matter physics).

He was the author or co-author of over 170 publications in peer-reviewed journals and was the primary advisor for 32 doctoral dissertations. He was elected a Fellow of the American Physical Society in 1969. He was awarded the Zener Prize in 1996.

He was predeceased by his wife, Pauline Brassard Granato, and at his death was survived by four children and three grandchildren.
