= Ronald Kissell =

Australian cricketer

Personal information
- Born: 22 February 1933; Sydney, Australia
- Died: 30 June 2015 (aged 82); Sydney, Australia
- Source: Cricinfo, 25 March 2016

Ronald Kissell (9 August 1928 – 30 June 2015) was an Australian cricketer. He played eleven first-class matches for New South Wales between 1946 and 1952. His top score and only fifty was an unbeaten 80 against the 1946/7 MCC side.

== See also ==
- List of New South Wales representative cricketers
