= Peter Prier =

- Born: 27 February 1942; Schlesien, Germany
- Died: 14 June 2015 (aged 73); Salt Lake City, Utah
- Occupation(s): Violinmaker, music teacher and businessman
- Website: www.prierviolins.com

Peter Paul Prier (27 February 1942 – 14 June 2015) was a German-born American violinmaker, music teacher and businessman. He founded Peter Prier and Sons Violins (originally named "Violin Making School of America", 1965). In 1972 he expanded his violin-fabricating business as a teaching school, where several present-day craftsmen learned their art. He also founded the Bow Making School of America (1998).

== Biography ==
Peter Prier was born 27 February 1942 in Schlesien, Germany in 1942, the youngest of four children. His father was killed in World War II. His remaining family (Peter, his mother and three siblings) moved to Bavaria in 1945 to escape the advancing Soviet forces.

In 1955 he began attending a music school in Munich, but dropped out to help support the family. He then attended a violinmaking school in Mittenwald, graduating four years later. In 1960 he immigrated to the United States, eventually settling in Salt Lake City, Utah.

His first employment was as an instrument repair technician with the Pearce Music Company, where he met his future wife, Kay. For three years (1961–1964) he also held a post in the Utah Symphony, which at the time consisted of part-time musicians. He also served an enlistment in the United States Army before marriage and his 1965 founding of a violinmaking shop, the Violin Making School of America, where he made violins, cellos and violas.

In 1972 he began accepting students, transforming the violinmaking shop into a true instructional laboratory. He later expanded this instruction to the fabrication of violin bows (1998), with the founding of the Bow Making School of America. He continued in these endeavors until his 2006 retirement, at which time he sold the school to a former student (graduated 1991), Charles Woolf. His sons Daniel and Martin continued the violinmaking shop.

Prier died in Salt Lake City, Utah on 14 June 2015. He was survived by wife Kay and their six children: sons Daniel, Martin and Paul; daughters Très Prier Hatch, Tamara Prier Stewart, and Kris Prier Edwards. Daniel, who had finished his first violin-making effort at age 12, completed his violin-making education in Chicago, Illinois, and established himself there, but returned to continue his father's work in 2006.

== Legacy and honors ==
Prier was a staunch advocate of the musical arts, supporting music programs in local schools and universities, and making his studio available for recitals. He donated several instruments to aspiring young musicians. He and his wife spent the last year of his life working with area church groups, providing music and encouragement.

Violinist Joseph Silverstein, who led the Utah Symphony for fifteen years (1983–1998), owns two of Prier's instruments. He was quoted in a local newspaper after Prier's death, stating that Prier's work was "the gold standard" in the US and throughout the world. He said:

His instruments spoke volumes of his wonderful artistry as a violinmaker and his importance as a teacher. He was a man of extraordinary integrity, really highly regarded by everybody that he came in contact with.

On 25 October 2015, a Peter Paul Prier Memorial Concert was held at the University of Utah. Participants included Jenny Oaks Baker, Daniel Heifetz, and Gerald Elias, a former violinist with the Boston Symphony Orchestra. Heifetz told of his experience of playing a particular piece on his beloved Stradivarius violin at a concert in the Washington D.C. area, then repeating the piece on his Prier violin, to demonstrate to the audience the near equivalence of the two instruments.
