= Coetie Neethling =

South African cricketer (1932–2015)

Personal information
- Full name: John J Neethling
- Born: 10 July 1932; Cape Town, South Africa
- Died: 10 June 2015 (aged 82); Cape Town, South Africa
- Source: Cricinfo, 25 March 2016

Coetie Neethling (10 July 1932 – 10 June 2015) was a South African cricketer. He played thirteen first-class matches for Western Province between 1971 and 1974.
