= John Hoerr =

American journalist and historian

John Hoerr (December 12, 1930 – June 21, 2015) was an American journalist and historian best known for his work on organized labor, industry, and politics.

He began a journalistic career in 1956 with United Press International in Newark, New Jersey and Trenton. Later he worked at The Daily Tribune in Royal Oak, Michigan, rejoined UPI for two years in Chicago, and served separate stints with Business Week, in Detroit and Pittsburgh, specializing as a labor reporter on the automobile, steel, and coal-mining industries. After five years as an on-air reporter and documentary producer at WQED, the PBS station in Pittsburgh, he returned to Business Week in 1975 as labor editor and later senior writer on the New York staff. Based upon his experience in reporting on national labor issues, in 1988 he published And the Wolf Finally Came, a book describing problems in both labor and management perceptions that contributed to the decline of the US steel industry in production and importance in the world economy. After leaving Business Week in 1991, he published two nonfiction books and one novel.

He was born in McKeesport, Pennsylvania, a steelmaking town in the Monongahela River Valley south of Pittsburgh. He graduated from McKeesport Area High School (1948) and Penn State University (1953). During college he worked short stints in the steel works at McKeesport. Hoerr served in the U.S. Army 1953-1955 and was stationed in France. After living for more than three decades in Teaneck, New Jersey, he moved to Middleborough, Massachusetts in 2009.

== Books ==
- And the Wolf Finally Came: The Decline of the American Steel Industry, nonfiction (Pittsburgh: University of Pittsburgh Press, 1988).
- We Can't Eat Prestige: The Women Who Organized Harvard, nonfiction (Philadelphia: Temple University Press, 1997).
- Harry, Tom and Father Rice: Accusation and Betrayal in America's Cold War, nonfiction (Pittsburgh: University of Pittsburgh Press, 2005).
- Monongahela Dusk, novel (Pittsburgh: Autumn House Press, 2009).

== Sources ==
Contemporary Authors Online. The Gale Group, 2008.
