= Feras Saied =

Syrian bodybuilder

Feras Saied (فراس السيد)
- Professional bodybuilder

Personal info
- Nickname: The Lion
- Born: January 17, 1981; Syria
- Died: June 6, 2015 (age 34); Dubai

Best statistics
- Height: 6 ft 3 in (191 cm)

Professional (Pro) career
- Best win: IFBB Arnold Classic Europe Amateur (Super heavyweight, overall); 2011

Feras Saied (Note: Several sources stated "Firas Saied" or "Feras Suliman Saied" was Saied's actual name.) (Arabic: فراس السيد; January 17, 1981 – June 6, 2015) was a professional Syrian bodybuilder.

== Biography ==
Feras Saied was originally from Homs, a city in western Syria that was held under the regime's control. As a revolutionary, Saied took part in a few demonstrations with his friends and fellow athletes. This led to his capture by the authorities, and the brutal torture he was subjected to. Imprisoned, he was bestially "punished" for being an activist opposed to the Assad regime. In an interview Saied recalled, "My body was strong enough to take the torture, but the real problem remained in the humiliation that I couldn't take." He was also a member of Syrian military forces.

Saied was the winner or finalist of many bodybuilding competitions, organized at national and worldwide levels. In 2000, he won the IFBB Arab Championships, in the junior category. The same year he placed third at IFBB World Championships, also as a junior. Saied went on to win such contests as the 2006 IFBB Ludus Maximus Championships, 2009 IFBB Gran Prix One Way Fitness, 2009 IFBB Italian Championships, and 2010 IFBB World Amateur Championships. He placed second at the 2011 IFBB Olympia Amateur, in the super heavyweight category. Nicknamed "The Lion," he became a professional IFBB bodybuilder in 2011. Saied earned his IFBB Pro Card after winning the '11 IFBB Arnold Classic Europe Amateur. He was the overall winner of the 2011 IFBB 19 Grand Prix Due Torri championships. He also placed second at the IFBB California State Pro championships in 2015. His competition weight was 282 lbs (128 kg).

Saied, a Muslim, lived in Fondi (Italy) for several years. He then left Italy, and moved to Dubai. He died in a motorcycle accident in Dubai on June 6, 2015.

== Partial contest history ==
- 2000: IFBB Arab Championships − 1st place in junior category
- 2000: IFBB World Championships − 3rd place in junior category
- 2002: IFBB World Amateur Championships − 5th place in heavy weight
- 2006: IFBB Ludus Maximus Championships (Italy) − 1st place
- 2007: IFBB Mediterranean Championships − 2nd place
- 2009: IFBB Gran Prix One Way Fitness − 1st place in super heavyweight and overall
- 2009: IFBB Italian Championships − 1st place in super heavyweight and overall
- 2010: IFBB Notte dei Campioni − 1st place in 90 kg+ category
- 2010: 18 Gran Prix Due Torri − 1st place in super heavyweight and overall
- 2010: IFBB World Amateur Championships − 1st place overall
- 2011: IFBB Olympia Amateur − 2nd place in super heavyweight
- 2011: IFBB Arnold Classic Europe Amateur − 1st place in super heavyweight and overall
- 2011: 19 Grand Prix Due Torri − 1st place in super heavyweight and overall
- 2012: FIBO Power Pro − 5th place
- 2012: Mr. Europe Pro − 4th place
- 2012: Arnold Classic Europe Pro − 10th place
- 2015: IFBB California State Pro − 2nd place

== Filmography ==
- 2014: Syria Untold (documentary)
