= John Hurry =

Group Captain John Hurry DSO DFC
- Group Captain John Hurry
- Born: 2 January 1920
- Died: 7 July 2015 (aged 95)
- Branch: Royal Air Force
- Service years: 1939–1975
- Rank: Group Captain
- Service number: 42839
- Commands: No. 51 Squadron; No. 80 Squadron; RAF Watton
- Conflicts: Second World War, Berlin Airlift, Malaya Emergency, Korean War

John Hurry DSO, DFC, (2 January 1920 – 7 June 2015) was a Royal Air Force officer who was one of the first pilots to join No. 83 Squadron of the Pathfinder Force, marking targets for British bombing attacks on Germany during the Second World War, and who later flew many sorties during the Berlin airlift.

== Early life ==
John Hurry was born on 2 January 1920 near Peterborough in southern England. His education saw him attend Donington Grammar School.

== Royal Air Force ==
=== Second World War ===
Hurry joined the RAF in 1939 on a short service commission and joined No. 51 Squadron as a Whitley Bomber pilot. His service with Bomber Command saw him participate in air raids on synthetic oil plants in western Germany. He was then directed to attacking ports on the west coast of France as well as submarine yards at Kiel, Bremen and Hamburg in support of the Battle of the Atlantic. He received his DFC after 26 operations and became a bombing instructor.

==== Pathfinders ====
Hurry became a flight commander with No. 83 Squadron who were assigned to the initial Pathfinder Force. Flying a Lancaster Bomber against Turin in Italy on 9 December 1942 his flares ignited in the bomb bay. He pressed on to the target and dropped his bombs before getting his damaged aircraft back to base.

He returned to attacking U-boat bases with raids on Lorient and St. Nazaire in 1943. Berlin was Hurry's destination several times, along with Essen on the first night of the Battle of the Ruhr. The spring of 1943 saw him rested after 62 raids and awarded a DSO, the citation praising Hurry's "utmost determination" and stating that "his courage and determination have been most outstanding and praiseworthy".

At the end of his tour with the Pathfinders he was mentioned in dispatches and became the chief instructor at a training unit.

== Post War ==
=== Berlin Airlift ===
After the end of the Second World War, Hurry served with the Air Division of the Allied Control Commission in Berlin. This was followed by the command of a squadron of York transport aircraft. In this capacity he flew 47 sorties as part of the Berlin airlift into RAF Gatow.

=== Malaya Emergency ===
Commanding No. 51 Squadron, Hurry flew men and materials into Malaya during the Malaya Emergency.

=== USAF and the Korean War ===
In January 1951 he took up a two-year appointment with the US Air Force and flew Globemaster transports to Japan and on to the Korean War.

=== NATO ===
Commanding No. 80 Squadron in Germany, Hurry flew Canberra reconnaissance planes with the Second Allied Tactical Air Force. In a competition, his squadron was judged as one of the most proficient in a NATO.

Guided weapons were his next area of work for two years, which included visits to the Woomera Range in Australia.

==== RAF Watton ====
He took command of RAF Watton in Norfolk in August 1967. The base was home of intelligence-gathering squadrons and an important air traffic control radar site. This period included organising the flypast at Caernarfon for the Investiture of the Prince of Wales.

==== Brussels ====
His last posting was as UK National Military Representative at NATO Headquarters in Brussels prior to his retirement in January 1975.

== Post RAF Career and Later Life ==
Hurry was the Civil Service Emergency Planning Officer for the south-east region. He also worked for Abbeyfield Care Homes in Amersham as treasurer and chairman.

In June 2012 he attended the dedication by Queen Elizabeth II of the Bomber Command Memorial at Green Park in London.

He died on 7 June 2015.
