= Jan de Voogd =

Dutch politician

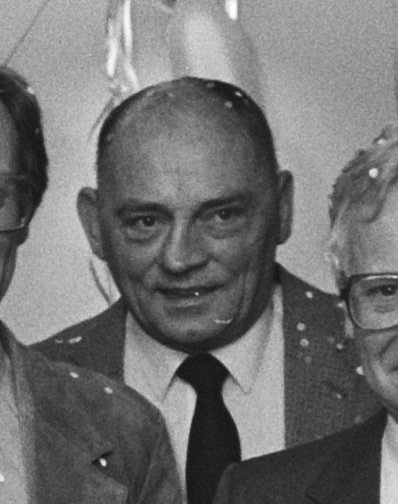
- Jan de Voogd (1981)

Member of the States of Zeeland
- In office 5 June 1974 – March 1991

Member of the House of Representatives
- In office 22 December 1977 – 10 June 1981

Member of the Provincial-Executive of Zeeland
- In office 2 June 1982 – March 1991

Personal details
- Born: 13 September 1924 Veere, Netherlands
- Died: 25 June 2015 (aged 90) Veere, Netherlands
- Party: People's Party for Freedom and Democracy (VVD)

Jan de Voogd (13 September 1924 – 25 June 2015) was a Dutch politician, he served as member of the House of Representatives for the People's Party for Freedom and Democracy between 1977 and 1981. He was also active in politics in his native province of Zeeland, serving as member of the States of Zeeland between June 1974 and March 1991 and concurrently as member of the Provincial-Executive from 1982 to March 1991.

== Career ==
De Voogd was born on 13 September 1924 in Veere, Zeeland. He followed his secondary education at the Hogere Burgerschool in Middelburg. In the 1940s he worked several years for the municipality of Veere. Starting in 1946 he worked for the government employment office, first ten years in Middelburg and subsequently ten years as director of the Vlissingen office. In 1965 he became the main consultant for a regional agency concerning students in Zeeland, which he stayed until 1978.

De Voogd took up political office on 5 June 1974 when he became member of the States of Zeeland for the People's Party for Freedom and Democracy. Starting on 2 June 1982 he concurrently served as member of the Provincial-Executive. His portfolio compromised amongst others infrastructure, public transport and legal affairs. He retired from both provincial offices in March 1991.

On the national political level De Voogd served as member of the House of Representatives between 22 December 1977 and 10 June 1981. In the House he dealt mostly with social affairs and was considered a backbencher.

Apart from his political functions De Voogd was active in numerous societal organisations and commissions. He was made a Knight in the Order of the Netherlands Lion on 29 April 1991. He died on 25 June 2015 in Veere.
