= Armstrong's Barn =

Coordinates: 53°1′55.12″N 6°15′4.79″W

- Interactive map of Armstrong's Barn

Restaurant information
- Established: 1972
- Closed: 1988
- Head chef: Peter Robinson, Paolo Tullio
- Food type: haute cuisine and traditional Irish
- Rating: Michelin Guide
- Location: Annamoe, County Wicklow, Ireland

Armstrong's Barn is a defunct restaurant in Annamoe, County Wicklow, Ireland that was awarded a Michelin star in 1977.

In 1972 Peter and Christine Robinson opened their restaurant in Annamoe, converting part of a large rural dwelling, with its garages housing the kitchen. They called it Armstrong's Barn after hearing that its location had long been known by that name, as a place for local gatherings and celebrations.

In the 1974 Good Food Guide (published by the British Consumers' Association) Armstrong's Barn was awarded "both a pestle and a bottle—the highest possible rating for a restaurant", and in the same year it earned a star in the Egon Ronay Guide. In 1975 the Good Food Guide renewed its commendation and the Automobile Association Guide to Hotels and Restaurants awarded Armstrong's Barn a rosette repeated in the following two years. In 1976 The Irish Times, in An Irishman's Diary of 15 May, mentioned Armstrong's Barn as "the only eatery acknowledged" in Wicklow by The Good Food Guide.

Following assessment by various Michelin representatives in 1977, Armstrong's Barn, with Peter Robinson as owner and head chef, along with chef Humphrey Weightman and front of house manager Hugh McCann, was awarded a star in the Ireland Michelin Guide (1978 edition). Between the assessment and the publication of the Michelin star, Robinson sold the restaurant to Paolo Tullio. In keeping with their policy concerning change of ownership, Michelin withdrew their star the following year. Humphrey Weightman remained on as head chef, and in 1980 and 1981 Michelin awarded the restaurant a Red M indicating "good food at a reasonable price". Paolo Tullio closed the restaurant in 1988 and later became a distinguished food critic.

== See also ==
- List of Michelin starred restaurants in Ireland
