= Alain Nadaud =

French novelist, writer and diplomat

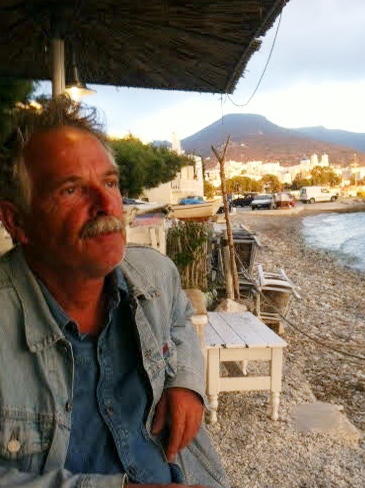
Alain Nadaud

Alain Nadaud (5 July 1948 – 12 June 2015) was a French novelist, writer and diplomat.

== Novels ==
- Archéologie du zéro, Denoël, 1984
- L'Envers du temps, Denoël, 1985
- Désert physique, Denoël, 1987
- L'Iconoclaste, Quai Voltaire, 1989
- La Mémoire d'Érostrate, Le Seuil, 1992
- Le Livre des malédictions, Grasset, 1995
- Auguste fulminant, Grasset, 1997
- Une aventure sentimentale, Verticales, 1999
- La Fonte des glaces, Grasset, 2000
- Les Années mortes, Grasset, 2004
- Le Vacillement du monde, Actes Sud, 2006
- Si Dieu existe, Albin Michel, 2007
- Le passage du col, Albin Michel, 2009
- La plage des demoiselles, Éditions Léo Scheer, 2010
- D'écrire j'arrête, Tarabuste Éditeur, 2010

== Other works ==
- La Tache aveugle, Éditeurs français réunis, 1980 (réédition Messidor 1990).
- Voyage au pays des bords du gouffre, Denoël, 1986.
- L'Iconolâtre, Tarabuste, 1995.
- Petit catalogue des nations barbares, L'Or du temps, Tunis, 1999.
- Ivre de livres, Balland, 1989.
- Malaise dans la littérature, Champ Vallon, 1993.
- Aux portes des enfers, enquête géographique littéraire et historique, Actes Sud, 2004.
- La Représentation, Dumerchez, 1991 (play)
- Vilas Sarang : Le Terroriste et autres récits, Denoël, 1988 (translation)
