= Jules Wright (theatre director) =

Australian theatre director

- Born: Alexandra Vesty; 25 February 1948; Melbourne, Australia
- Died: 21 June 2015 (aged 67); London, England
- Occupation: Theatre director
- Spouse: Josh Wright

Jules Wright (25 February 1948 – 21 June 2015) was an Australian-born theatre director, a co-founder in 1981 of the Women's Playhouse Trust (WPT), the first resident woman director at the Royal Court Theatre, being at that time one of only six women to have directed on its main stage.

== Early life ==
Wright was born Alexandra Vesty in Melbourne on 25 February 1948. Adopted by a couple from Adelaide, she studied educational psychology at the University of Adelaide.

== Career ==
At the Theatre Royal at Stratford East, Clare Venables gave Wright the opportunity to direct professionally. Subsequently, Wright became an artistic director at the Liverpool Playhouse.

At the Royal Court Theatre Wright directed Sarah Daniels’ Masterpieces, a play dealing with pornography, which, in 1998, the National Theatre selected as a representative play of the 1980s in its NT2000 list of "One Hundred Plays of the Century"

In 1984 Wright directed the WPT's opening production, Aphra Behn's 1686 play The Lucky Chance. The cast included Harriet Walter, Alan Rickman, Pam Ferris, Kathryn Pogson and Denis Lawson. Design was by Jenny Tiramani and music composed by Ilona Sekacz. In 1995 Wright worked again on a play by Behn, the first English woman professional playwright, when she directed The Rover for the BBC/Open University.

Wright has been described as outspoken and a feminist. She took the Arts Council to court to challenge their funding cuts; she directed Julie Covington as Lady Macbeth in a controversial Macbeth at the Royal Lyceum Theatre, Edinburgh, a production that largely exonerated Lady Macbeth from blame; her production of The Revenger's Tragedy for the Sydney Theatre Company (STC) in 1991 was considered to be clinical in its dissection of the misogyny portrayed in the play and how that misogyny distorts the play's characters. She also directed a Caryl Churchill double bill—Hot Fudge and Ice Cream—for the STC in 1990.

In the early 1990s, WPT acquired on a disused Wapping Hydraulic Power Station in Wapping and adopted the name and brand The Wapping Project. Wapping Hydraulic Power Station was converted by Shed54 architecture practice to became a gallery, performance space, and restaurant. Famous for the parties, events and installations that took place there, The Wapping Project sold the Wapping Hydraulic Power Station in 2013 and currently works internationally as a 'nomadic' organisation.

Jules Wright was awarded the honorary degree of Doctor of Letters by Bristol University in 2012

== Personal life ==
She married Josh Wright—whom she met at school in Adelaide—in 1967 and came with him to the UK in 1973., where he worked as an architect while Wright studied for a PhD at Bristol University researching psychology, performance and place. Their marriage was dissolved, but they remarried in 2015, four days before her death from cancer.

Wright trained as a clinical psychologist working with anorexia patients.

She died in London on 21 June 2015. On 10 July 2015, Wright's life was one of those celebrated on BBC Radio 4's obituary programme Last Word.
