= Armand DiMele =

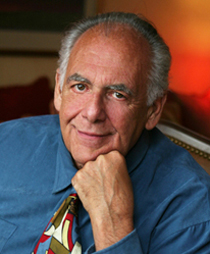
Armand F. DiMele

Armand F. DiMele (March 14, 1940 – June 22, 2015) was a psychotherapist and radio broadcaster from New York. He was a Board Certified Diplomate in Clinical Social Work, a Certified Rehabilitation Specialist and a registered graduate education Supervisor.

He grew up on the Lower East Side of New York City. A self-styled drummer, he had an early introduction to jazz living on 6th street, neighbor to Bill Barron, Lee Morgan, Booker Ervin, Elvin Jones and countless other jazz greats.

The Five Spot Cafe in the Bowery neighborhood was his second home. He was also exposed to radio at a very young age. His parents owned a radio repair store at 247 East 10th Street in New York.

DiMele worked on Wall Street as a securities specialist and trader between 1960 and 1969, promoted to manager of the prestigious Van Alstyne Noel and Company. While working, he attended Hunter College at night studying psychology. He interned with Sam Barondes and Hirsh Cohen at Albert Einstein College of Medicine on studying the chemical basis of memory storage. He simultaneously attended the Metropolitan Community for Psychotherapy training program. He had extensive training in both traditional and contemporary modalities of psychotherapy and healing.

DiMele died from complications related to pneumonia and pulmonary disease on June 22, 2015.

== "The Positive Mind" Radio Program ==
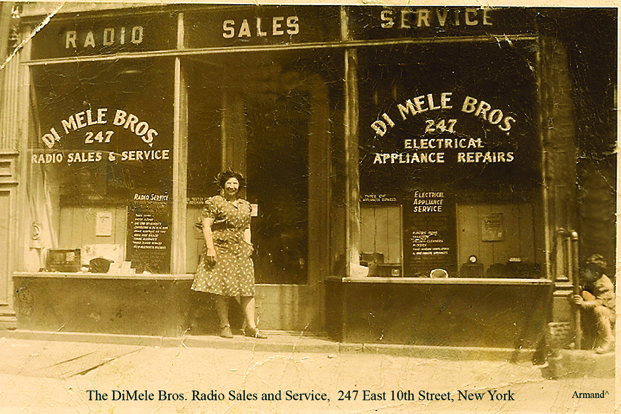
Armand at his parents' radio store (5 years old)

DiMele was the on-air radio host of "The Positive Mind", a program discussing psychotherapy and how it impacts our lives. Each program opens with, “bringing you ideas, concepts and guests to help you lead a more positively minded life”. He started broadcasting in 1982 on WBAI FM, a Pacifica station located in New York City.

The program discusses a broad range of topics including obsessive compulsive disorder, PTSD, sexual obsession, being loved, rebellion, anger, dependency, betrayal and inner feelings. Programs often cover recent research in psychology including brain imaging and neurobiology.

The program airs live on WBAI FM at 1 pm Tuesdays and Wednesdays from a studio located at The DiMele Center on 57th Street in New York.

== Other areas of notability ==
DiMele was featured in the 2009 Emmy award-winning documentary, "Home".

He was also the subject of a fictional book written by Margot Berwin, his patient, entitled, "Hot House Flower, 9 plants of Desire". The book was discovered by Julia Roberts in 2008, who suggested that she will be producing and starring in an adaptation of the novel. The release date is yet unknown.

He has been cited numerous times in the media including The New York Times and News 21

He is the co-author of "Repairing Your Marriage After His Affair: A Woman's Guide to Hope and Healing" (ISBN 0761509631) along with Emily Brown and Marcella Bakur Weiner.

In 1976 a war between psychologists was waged in the courts over who owns the name "Primal". On one side, Arthur Janov, Ph.D. claimed he did, as he had registered the name with the U.S. Patent Office in 1970. Dr. Janov had his attorneys sue two therapists and warn 75 others not to describe their work as "Primal". On the other side is the International Primal Association, which Armand helped form In 1973. The organization was made up of therapists who had broken away from Janov. Armand was publicly quoted saying, "Nobody owns the word 'Primal'. We've found the name used by Freud and Reich. It's like owning the word 'analysis'. It's not right to patent a word that's a process."
