= Bart Williams (actor) =

American actor (1949–2015)

- Born: September 18, 1949; Los Angeles, California, U.S.
- Died: June 28, 2015 (aged 65); Bullhead City, Arizona, U.S.
- Occupations: Character actor, documentary filmmaker

Bart Williams (September 18, 1949 – June 28, 2015) was an American character actor and documentary filmmaker. He was also an advocate and official for the Actors' Equity Association. Williams was a principal councilor on the Actors' Equity's Western Regional Board and National Council, as well as a member of the association's Membership Education and Hollywood Boulevard Theaters Committees.

Williams co-directed, produced, and wrote The Last First Comic, a 2010 documentary focusing on Irv Benson, who is believed to be the last surviving burlesque & Vaudeville comedian. Williams' documentary earned several awards from film festivals.

Williams died of cancer at his home in Bullhead City, Arizona, on June 28, 2015, at the age of 65.
