= Helen Faison =

American educator

- Born: Helen Smith; July 13, 1924
- Died: June 17, 2015 (aged 90); Forest Hills, Pennsylvania
- Education: University of Pittsburgh
- Occupations: Educator, superintendent
- Known for: First female and first African American high school principal and deputy superintendent in Pittsburgh
- Spouse: George W. Faison

Helen Faison (July 13, 1924–June 17, 2015) was an American educator with a long career with the Pittsburgh Public Schools, rising from teacher to the superintendent of Pittsburgh Public Schools. She was the first African American and the first woman to become superintendent of district schools.

== Life and work ==
Born Helen Smith, she lived in Homewood, Pennsylvania, a neighborhood in Pittsburgh, but when she was seven, her mother who was dying of tuberculosis, moved Helen and her siblings to rural Lowesville, Virginia, to stay with a grandmother. Because the small school district there would not allow Black children to attend beyond grade seven, Faison was forced to change schools, and she completed eighth and ninth grades in a nearby town. In time, the family returned to Pittsburgh to live with their father and stepmother. However, when Faison was a senior in high school, her father died at 42 of kidney disease and hypertension.

Faison went on to earn her bachelor's degree in education (1946), master's in education (1955), and doctorate in educational administration (1975), all at the University of Pittsburgh. She married George W. Faison in 1959.

Faison began her career teaching social studies and English at Fifth Avenue High School in 1950. In 1960, she became the district’s first Black high school guidance counselor and worked at Westinghouse High School, from which she had graduated in 1942. Later, in 1968, she became the first African American and first woman to serve as principal at Fifth Avenue High School.

=== Trailblazer ===
Faison was one of the first African American teachers in the school district and was both the first female and first African American in Pittsburgh to hold the position of high school principal and deputy superintendent.

She retired in 1993 and took a position as Distinguished Visiting Professor of Education at Chatham University. Soon she moved up to take over the education department becoming its chairwoman and was chosen as the founding director of the Pittsburgh Teachers Institute in 1999. She chose to take a leave of absence from the institute later that year to become the interim superintendent for the city school district after the resignation of the district's superintendent. In doing so, she became the first African-American in that position. She returned to the institute the following year.

=== Honors ===
Faison received recognition from various community organizations including the Council of Great Schools, the Pittsburgh NAACP, the League of Women Voters, the Western Pennsylvania Historical Society and Carlow College (now Carlow University).

The Pittsburgh Public School District recognized her contributions by naming its new elementary school in Homewood in her honor: the Helen S. Faison Arts Academy (now Pittsburgh Faison K-5).

In 2000, she received an honorary doctorate and was named a Pitt Legacy Laureate. She worked selflessly as a member of the Board of Trustees of the Fund for Advancement of Minorities through Education since the organization was created. The School of Education at the University of Pittsburgh created the Helen S. Faison Scholarships for "outstanding undergraduate students from underserved communities."

In 2006, the university's Chancellor Mark A. Nordenberg announced the creation of the Dr. Helen S. Faison Chair in Urban Education, "the first fully endowed chair in the history of Pitt’s School of Education." Three Pittsburgh foundations were the lead donors in creating the Faison Chair, each contributing $500,000.

Helen Faison died in Forest Hills, Pennsylvania, on June 17, 2015, at the age of 91.
