= Sharon Bryant (politician) =

American politician

Chief of the Monacan Indian Nation
- In office 2011 – June 23, 2015
- Preceded by: Kenneth Branham

Personal details
- Born: June 22, 1961
- Died: June 23, 2015 (aged 54)

Sharon Rebecca Bryant (June 22, 1961 – June 23, 2015) was an American tribal politician who served as the Chief of the Monacan Indian Nation from 2011 until her death in 2015. She was the first woman to hold the position of Chief of the Monacan Indian Nation, a state-recognized tribe based in the Bear Mountain region of Amherst County, Virginia. Bryant, who was elected chief in 2011, led the ongoing efforts to win federal recognition for the Monacans.

== Biography ==
Bryant was born on June 22, 1961. Her Monacan tribal name was "Bear Woman." Her grandfather, Harry Loving Branham, had also served as the Monacan chief during the 1960s.

She was a lifetime resident of Amherst County, Virginia. Bryant dropped out of Amherst County High School at the age of 16, but later obtained her GED and pursued higher education. In a 2015 interview, Bryant said she dreamed of one day becoming Monacan chief. An Episcopal lay minister, Bryant was training to become an Episcopal priest at the time of her death.

=== Chief of the Monacan Indian Nation ===
Bryant's entry into tribal, state and federal politics was motivated by a history of discrimination against the Monacan people. The first registrar for the Virginia Bureau of Vital Statistics, Dr. Walter Plecker, who held the position from 1912 to 1946, refused to acknowledge that the Monacans, or any of the other Virginian Native American tribes, were distinct, "real" people and ethnic groups. He orchestrated a series of racially motivated, discriminatory policies against the Monacans. The Virginia Racial Integrity Act of 1924, which was supported by Plecker, required that all Virginians be classified as either "white" or "colored."

Plecker altered the birth records and other records of the Monacans and other Native Americans, listing their identity as "colored," thus denying members' Native American heritage. Years later, because of the "colored" birth records, the U.S. federal government declined to grant federal recognition to the Monacans. The legacy of Plecker's racist policies fueled both a revival of the Monacan culture and Bryant's entry into politics years later. Bryant served on the tribe's economic development committee prior to her election as chief.

In 2011, Kenneth Branham, who had served as Chief of the Monacans for four terms, did not seek re-election in the June tribal election. Sharon Bryant was elected Chief of the Monacan Indian Nation in June 2011, becoming the first woman to serve in that position. She defeated Joe Dorey of Rockbridge County in the election.

As Chief, Bryant worked with Virginia's federal congressmen and U.S. Senators to seek federal recognition for the Monacan Indian Nation. The tribe has already been recognized by the state of Virginia. She sought to make the tribe financially sustainable. Bryant oversaw the creation of several smaller, local programs as well, including Christmas gifting exchange. She partnered with Natural Bridge Park, site of the tribe's annual festival, the Monacan Nation Powwow.

== Death ==
On June 23, 2015, Bryant died in her home at the age of 54, as a result of cancer. She had undergone cancer treatment and surgery, but was diagnosed with liver cancer less than one month before her death. Bryant had planned to run for a second term as Chief in the June 2015 tribal elections, but was forced to drop out of the race due to her cancer diagnosis.

Elections were held in later in June 2015 to choose her successor.

== See also ==
- List of Native American politicians
- Native American women in politics
