= Adolf Dehn =

American artist (1895–1968)

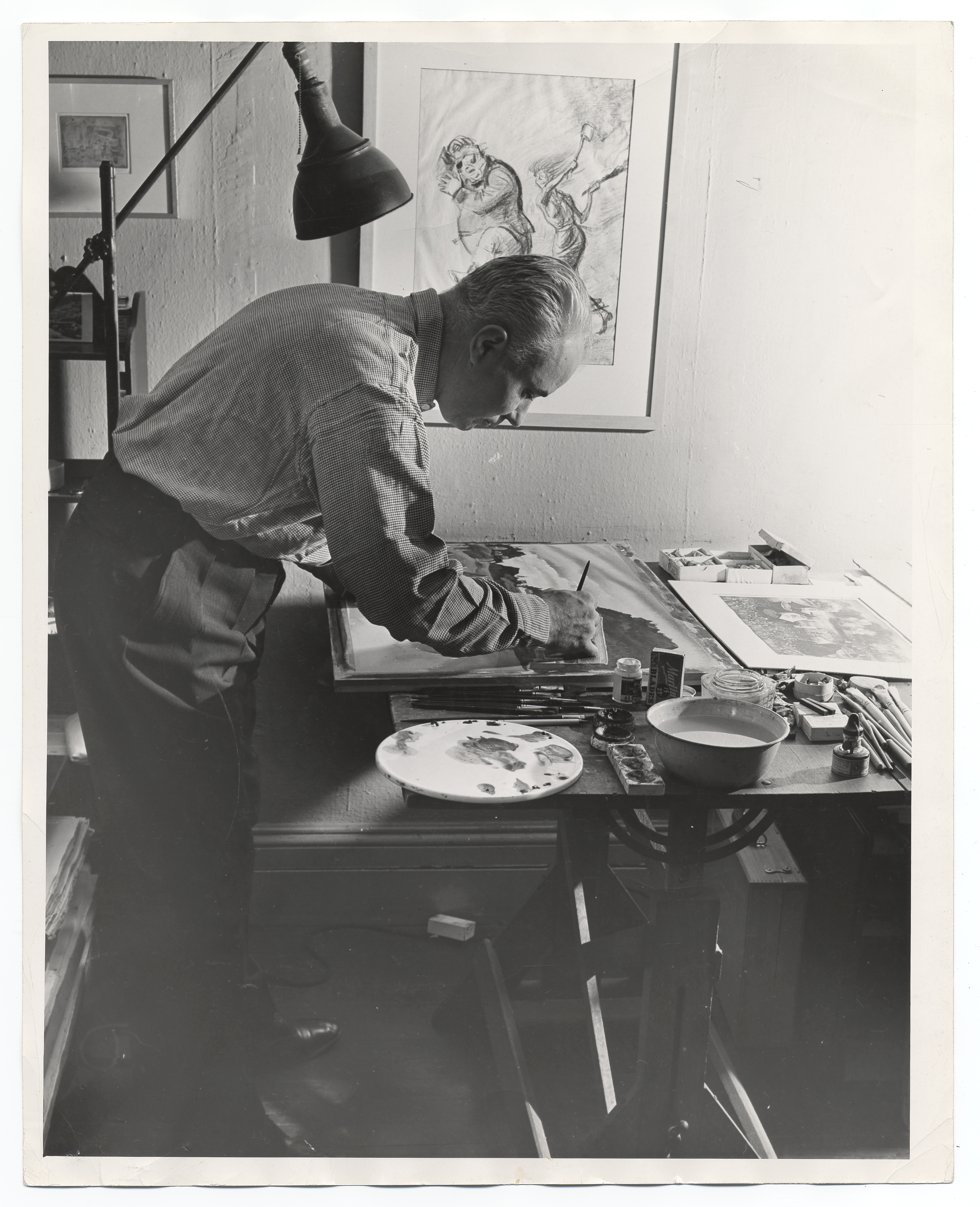
- Dehn working on a painting for submission to Art Week, 1940
- Born: November 22, 1895; Waterville, Minnesota, United States
- Died: May 19, 1968 (aged 72); New York City, New York, United States
- Education: Minneapolis College of Art and Design; Art Students League, New York City
- Known for: Lithography, illustration, drawing, watercolors, casein painting
- Movement: Regionalism, social realism, caricature
- Awards: Guggenheim Fellowship (2), National Academy of Design, American Academy of Arts and Letters

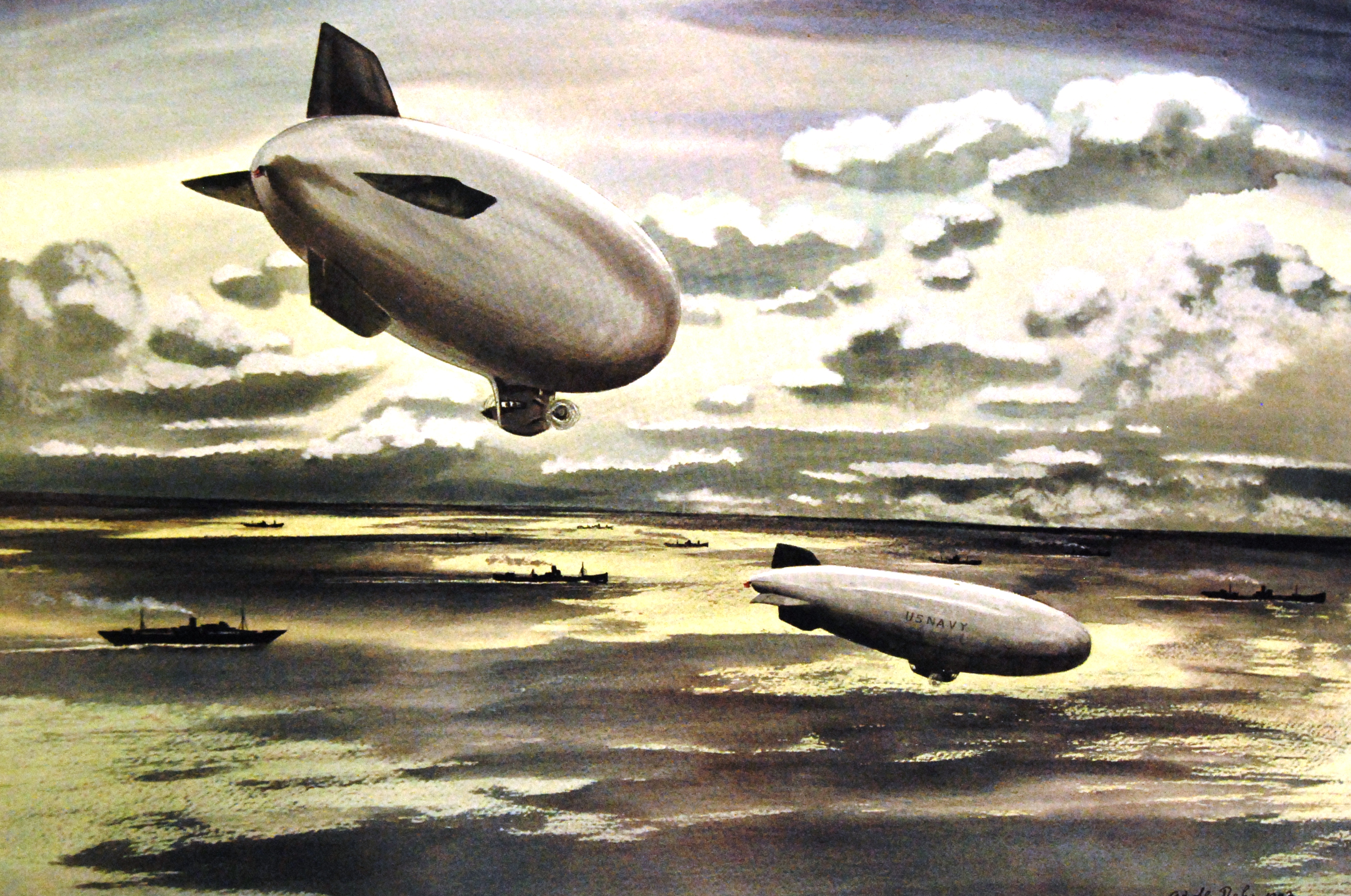
The Convoy Brook, Abbott Collection, Paintings of Naval Aviation during World War II

Adolf Dehn (November 22, 1895 – May 19, 1968) was an American artist known mainly as a lithographer. Throughout his artistic career, he participated in and helped define some important movements in American art, including regionalism, social realism, and caricature. A two-time recipient of the Guggenheim Fellowship, he was known for both his technical skills and his high-spirited, droll depictions of human foibles.

== Biography ==
Dehn was born in 1895 in Waterville, Minnesota. He began creating artwork at the age of six, and by the time of his death had created nearly 650 images.

After graduating as valedictorian from Waterville High School in 1914, he went to the Minneapolis School of Art (known today as the Minneapolis College of Art and Design), where he met and became a close friend of Wanda Gág. She was Dehn's first love and the two were "practically inseparable for the next five years... " (1916–1921). In 1917 he and Gág were two of only a dozen students in the country to earn a scholarship to the Art Students League of New York. He was drafted to serve in World War I in 1918, but declared himself a conscientious objector and spent four months in a guardhouse detention camp in Spartanburg, SC and then worked for eight months as a painting teacher at an arm rehabilitation hospital in Asheville, NC. Later, Dehn returned to the Art Students League for another year of study and created his first lithograph, The Harvest.

=== Early career ===
In 1921 Dehn's lithographs were featured in his first exhibition at Weyhe Gallery in New York City. From 1920 to 1921 in Manhattan, he was connected to New York's politically left-leaning activists. In 1921, he went to Europe. In Paris and Vienna he belonged to a group of expatriate intellectuals and artists, including Andrée Ruellan, Gertrude Stein, and ee cummings.

Dehn found living in Europe cheap and was able to embark on artist adventures of what some consider the "glory years" of the 20s. About his time in Europe, he said, "Life in Paris is simply glorious." He supported himself through his time in Europe by providing light-hearted cartoons and scenic European landscapes to editors back in the U.S. A number of the caricatures he drew depicting the Roaring 20s, burlesque, opera houses, and the café scene appeared in such magazines as Vanity Fair. Dehn himself felt that his caricatures and cartoons were different from others because his motives were "never really political" but more focused on social commentary. The fame that Dehn achieved during his time in Europe, his illustrations appearing in many leftist publications such as The Liberator, The New Masses, and The Dial, was noted by hometown paper The Minneapolis Journal in 1925. The publication described Dehn as "being born with a pitchfork in his mouth" while commenting on the worldly nature of his drawings.

His favorite medium was lithography, and he alternated between spoofing high society and creating beautiful landscapes. Throughout his time in Europe, Dehn was in contact with many other notable intellectuals and artists of the time, including Josephine Baker, Kurt Weill, and Leo Stein. It was in Paris that Dehn met his first wife, Mura Ziperovitch (Mura Dehn), a dancer who had left revolutionary Russia. Upon his return to the U.S. the Chicago Tribune's Paris edition published a farewell to Dehn, stating, "We are sorry to see that Adolf Dehn is going back to America," marking the impression his presence made among the inhabitants of Montparnasse.

=== Later career ===
In 1929 Dehn returned to New York City with his wife. In New York, he began to focus his art on depicting scenes of Manhattan, showcasing the skyline and views of the city from the Staten Island Ferry. As the Great Depression had taken hold of the country, Dehn and his wife were desperately poor, and their financial difficulties contributed to their ultimate divorce. In the 1930s, his work began to appear in magazines such as The New Yorker and Vogue. During his period as a lithographer, his striking images of New York, including Central Park, captured the essence of the Roaring 20s and the 1930s Depression.

Beginning in 1930, Dehn made numerous trips back to his home in Minnesota, where he could live cheaply, and he executed a significant number of drawings and lithographs based on Midwest scenes. He also summered on Martha's Vineyard from 1933 to 1936, often in the company of Thomas Hart Benton, Jackson Pollock, Georges Schreiber, and others in the vicinity of Gay Head and Menemsha, and joined by his girlfriend at the time, Eileen Lake.

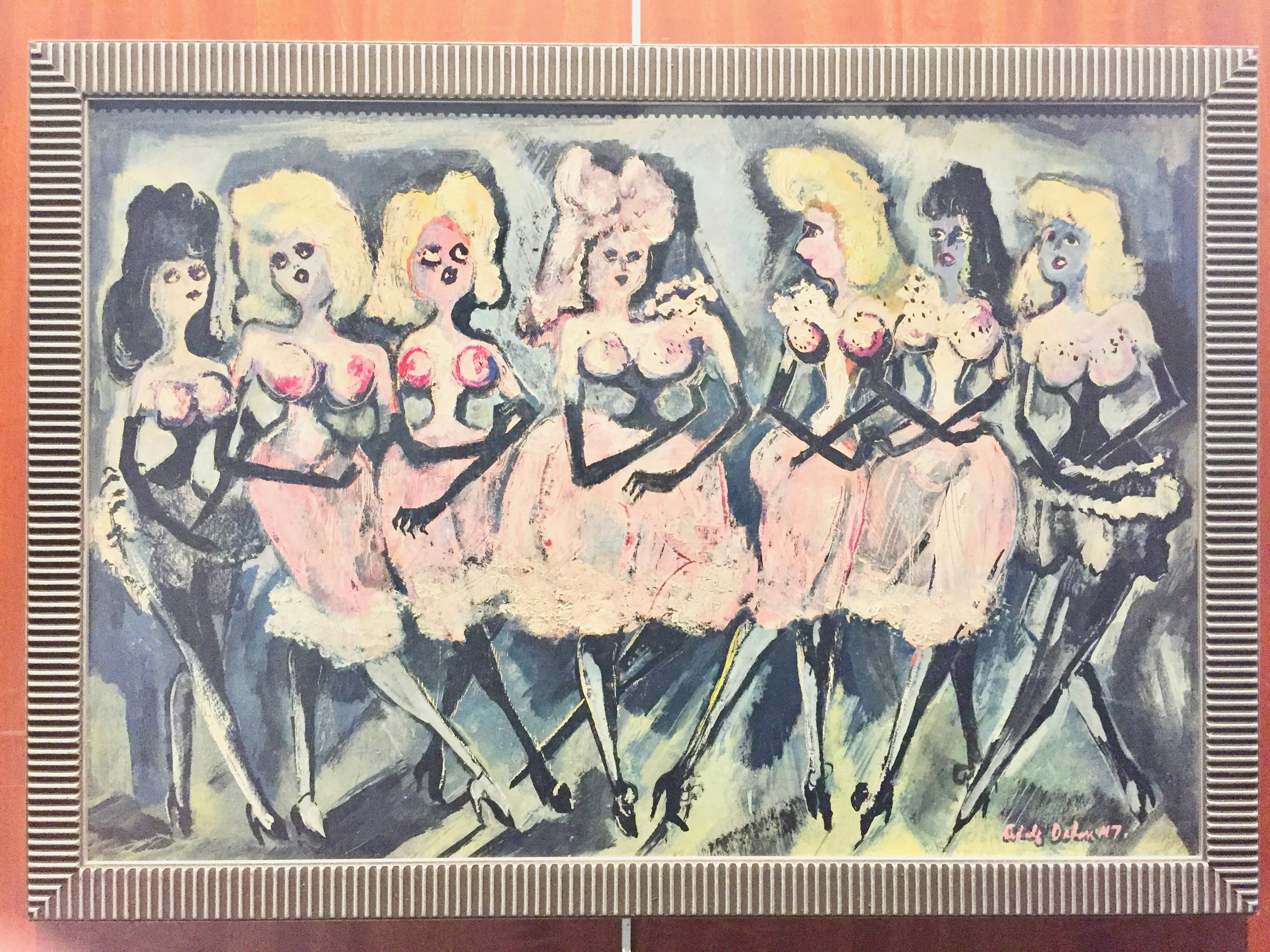
Pink and Black Ballet Girls, 1947, Adolf Dehn.

In the early 1930s, Dehn established The Adolf Dehn Print Club and became a founding member of the Associated American Artists. Prints magazine selected Dehn as one of the 10 best printmakers in the United States in 1936.

Dehn earned a Guggenheim Fellowship in 1939, which allowed him to travel to the western United States and Mexico. In the early 40s, he worked as an instructor of etching and lithography at the Colorado Springs Fine Arts Center and received a citation from the U.S. treasury department for "Distinguished Service Rendered in Behalf of War Savings Program."

Dehn started executing watercolors in late 1936, admitting he had "been afraid of color" in the first decades of his career. He rose to the top tier of American watercolorists in short order, seen in a feature article on his landscape watercolors in Life magazine (August, 1941) and a traveling show organized by the Museum of Modern Art, "Four American Water Colorists" (1943–44) in which eleven Dehn watercolors were joined with the works of Winslow Homer, John Singer Sargent, and Charles Burchfield. Dehn's watercolors were described to have a "homely poetry with a modern sensitiveness." Watercolor painting and casein painting represented signature second and third arms of Dehn's artistic output for the rest of his career.

In 1944, Dehn met Virginia Engleman, who was working in the Associated American Artists printshop. The couple married in 1947 and enjoyed an artistic collaboration for the rest of his life. In the 1940s, Dehn began to sell more lithographs and to teach other American artists lithography techniques. In 1947 he joined the Society of American Graphic Artists, exhibiting his lithograph, Lake in Central Park, in the 32nd Annual Exhibition for $5.00. Dehn published his first book, titled Water Color Painting, in 1945. As he became more widely recognized and financially successful, he was able to travel extensively. As well as visiting and painting Key West and the southwestern region of the United States, he went to Venezuela, Cuba, Haiti, Afghanistan and other areas of the world. The wide range of subject matter found in his prints, drawings, and paintings reflects his travels. He was awarded a second Guggenheim Fellowship in 1951.

In 1961, Dehn was elected as a full academician to the National Academy of Design, and in 1965 he was elected as a member of the National Institute of Arts and Letters. He visited Paris for the last time in 1967, where he worked at the Atelier Desjobert.

Dehn died in New York City on May 19, 1968, after suffering a heart attack. He is remembered as a prolific artist of great range. His works are held in over 100 museums (including the National Gallery of Art, National Portrait Gallery, Metropolitan Museum, Museum of Modern Art, and Whitney Museum of American Art); over 25 museums hold extensive collections of his output. Many prominent galleries represented Dehn as his fame grew, and posthumously, among them Harmon-Meek Gallery and Thomas French Fine Art.

== Works ==
=== Paintings and drawings ===
Dehn had a distinct style of illustration and painting. His drawings of this period exhibit freedom in line and form along with social satire. Dehn's landscapes suggest the grandeur of nature, and a signature element in them for which Dehn was praised was the magnificence of his clouds.

=== Prints ===
Many of Dehn's prints are made using tusche, a liquid lithographic medium which allows for fluid effects. He has been called the "Debussy of American lithography" and "Dean of American lithography" by printmaking experts Clinton Adams and Philadelphia Museum of Art's Prints and Drawings curator, Carl Zigrosser. With his art Dehn introduced new techniques that had never before been used in lithography, and was praised as one of the world's leading printmakers.

=== Additional works and photos ===
In an artist statement he wrote for an exhibit at St. Olaf College in Minnesota, Dehn said, "My paintings are my statement. What I have to offer as a painter is direct and simple and words are not necessary to a greater understanding or enjoyment of them."

== Collections ==
Selected museum and other institutional collections holding Adolf Dehn paintings and/or prints as part of their permanent collections include the following.

Museum/institution	Location
Ackland Art Museum, The University of North Carolina at Chapel Hill	Chapel Hill, NC
Albertina Museum	Vienna, Austria
Albright-Knox Art Gallery	Buffalo, NY
Arizona State University Art Museum	Tempe, AZ
Art Institute of Chicago	Chicago, IL
Art Museum of Western Virginia (now Taubman Museum of Art)	Roanoke, VA
Audubon House and Tropical Gardens	Key West, FL
The Baker Museum Artis-Naples	Naples, FL
Besser Museum for Northeast Michigan	Alpena, MI
Boca Raton Museum of Art	Boca Raton, FL
British Museum	London, UK
Brooklyn Museum	Brooklyn, NY
Buffalo Bill Center of the West	Cody, WY
The Butler Institute of American Art	Youngstown, OH
Canton Museum of Art	Canton, OH
Carnegie Museum of Art	Pittsburgh, PA
Charles H. MacNider Art Museum	Mason City, IA
Cincinnati Art Museum	Cincinnati, OH
Colorado Springs Fine Art Center	Colorado Springs, CO
Columbus Museum of Art	Columbus, OH
Cummer Museum of Art and Gardens	Jacksonville, FL
David Winton Bell Gallery, List Art Center, Brown University	Providence, RI
Davidson Art Center, Wesleyan University	Middletown, CT
deCordova Sculpture Park and Museum	Lincoln, MA
Detroit Institute of Arts	Detroit, MI
El Paso Museum of Art	El Paso, TX
Everhart Museum	Scranton, PA
Fairfield University Art Museum	Fairfield, CT
Farnsworth Art Museum	Rockland, ME
Fayetteville Museum of Art	Fayetteville, NC
Flint Institute of Art	Flint, MI
The George Washington University Dimmock Gallery	Washington, DC
Georgia Museum of Art, University of Georgia	Athens, GA
Golisano Children's Museum of Naples	Naples, FL
Grand Rapids Art Museum	Grand Rapids, MI
Grunwald Center for the Graphic Arts, UCLA	Los Angeles, CA
Hirshhorn Museum and Sculpture Garden	Washington, DC
Hofstra University Museum	Hempstead, NY
Illinois State Museum	Springfield, IL
Indianapolis Museum of Art	Indianapolis, IN
Jewett Arts Center, Wellesley College	Wellesley, MA
Joslyn Art Museum	Omaha, NE
Kalamazoo Institute of Arts	Kalamazoo, MI
Kresge Art Museum, Michigan State University	East Lansing, MI
La Salle University Art Museum	Philadelphia, PA
Le Sueur County Historical Society	LeCenter, MN
Louisiana Arts & Science Museum	Baton Rouge, LA
LSU Libraries, LSU	Baton Rouge, LA
Luther College	Decorah, IA
McNay Art Museum	San Antonio, TX
Mead Art Museum, Amherst College	Amherst, MA
Meadows Museum, Southern Methodist University	Dallas, TX
Memorial Art Gallery, University of Rochester	Rochester, NY
Memphis Brooks Museum of Art	Memphis, TN
The Metropolitan Museum of Art	New York, NY
Midwest Museum of American Art	Elkhart, IN
Minneapolis Institute of Art	Minneapolis, MN
Minnesota Historical Society	St. Paul, MN
Minnesota Museum of American Art	St. Paul, MN
Missouri State University Collection	Springfield, MO
Mitchell Wolfson Collection	Miami Beach, FL
Montclair Art Museum	Montclair, NJ
Munson-Williams-Proctor Arts Institute	Utica, NY
Museum of Art and Archaeology, University of Missouri	Columbia, MO
Museum of Art - DeLand	Deland, FL
Museum of Fine Arts	St. Petersburg, FL
Museum of Fine Arts Springfield Museums	Springfield, MA
Museum of Modern Art	New York, NY
National Gallery of Art	Washington, DC
Naval History and Heritage Command Museums	Washington, DC
New Britain Museum of American Art	New Britain, CT
New Orleans Museum of Art	New Orleans, LA
Newark Museum	Newark, NJ
Norfolk Museum of Arts and Sciences (now Chrysler Museum of Art)	Norfolk, VA
Norton Museum of Art	West Palm Beach, FL
Ohio Wesleyan University Art Collection	Delaware, OH
Paine Art Center and Gardens	Oshkosh, WI
Pennsylvania Academy of the Fine Arts	Philadelphia, PA
Philadelphia Museum of Art	Philadelphia, PA
Philbrook Museum of Art	Tulsa, OK
Plattsburgh State Art Museum, State University of New York	Plattsburgh, NY
Portland Art Museum	Portland, OR
Queens Museum	Queens, NY
Radford University Art Museum	Radford, VA
Roswell Museum & Art Center	Roswell, NM
Saint Louis Art Museum	St. Louis, MO
San Francisco Museum of Modern Art	San Francisco, CA
São Paulo Museum of Art	São Paulo, Brazil
Seattle Art Museum	Seattle, WA
Sheldon Museum of Art, University of Nebraska	Lincoln, NE
Smithsonian American Art Museum	Washington, DC
Smithsonian National Portrait Gallery	Washington, DC
Southern Alleghenies Museum of Art	Loretto, PA
Speed Art Museum	Louisville, KY
Spencer Museum of Art, University of Kansas	Lawrence, KS
Springfield Art Museum	Springfield, MO
Swope Art Museum	Terre Haute, IN
Syracuse University Art Galleries	Syracuse, NY
Terra Museum of American Art (now closed)	Chicago, IL
Tweed Museum of Art, University of Minnesota	Duluth, MN
Ulrich Museum of Art, Wichita State University	Wichita, KS
The University of Arizona Museum of Art	Tucson, AZ
University of New Mexico Art Museum	Albuquerque, NM
Virginia Museum of Fine Arts	Richmond, VA
The von Liebig Art Center	Naples, FL
Wadsworth Atheneum	Hartford, CT
Walker Art Center	Minneapolis, MN
Washington Pavilion of Arts and Science	Sioux Falls, SD
Whitney Museum of American Art	New York, NY
Wichita Art Museum	Wichita, KS
Wichita Falls Museum of Art at Midwestern State University	Wichita Falls, TX
Woodstock Artists Association and Museum	Woodstock, NY
Wright Museum of Art, Beloit College	Beloit, WI
Yale University Art Gallery	New Haven, CT
Yellowstone Art Museum	Billings, MT

== Exhibition history ==
Adolf Dehn exhibitions, 1915–2021:

Year	Title	Location	Month
2021	Dehn and Dehn: Selected Works of Adolf and Virginia Dehn	The Bundy Modern, Waitsfield, VT	May
2020	People & Places	Harmon-Meek Gallery, Naples, FL	April
2019	Engaging the Far West: Adolf Dehn's Colorado and Peter Hurd's New Mexico	D. Wigmore Gallery, New York, NY	December
2019	Adolf Dehn's New York	Delamar Hotels, Greenwich, CT	November
2019	Terra Florida (4-artist show)	D. Wigmore Gallery, New York, NY	March
2017	A.D. Retrospective	Museum of Art, Deland, FL	July
2017	Adolf Dehn and the American Land	Colorado Springs Fine Arts Center, Colorado Springs, CO	December
2017	Adolf Dehn: Midcentury Manhattan	Fairfield University Art Museum, Fairfield, CT	January- April
2017	Adolf Dehn: Midcentury Manhattan	Sheldon Swope Art Museum, Terre Haute, IN	June- August
2017	Adolf Dehn: Midcentury Manhattan	Artist Book Foundation (at MASS MoCA), North Adams, MA	October
2016	Adolf Dehn: At Home and Far Afield	Tremaine Art Center, Suffield Academy, Suffueld, CT	January- March
2016	Adolf Dehn’s Pennsylvania	Southern Alleghenies Museum of Art, Loretto, PA	January- April
2016	The Gentle Satire of Adolf Dehn	Palmer Museum of Art, Pennsylvania State University, University Park, PA	August- December
2015	A.D. in the Caribbean	Harmon-Meek Gallery, Naples, FL	April
2015	The Other Side of Midnight: Paintings and Prints by A.D.	Yellowstone Art Museum, Billings, Montana	June
2015	Adolf Dehn: Landscapes	Springfield Art Museum, Springfield, MO	May
2012	Dehn’s Dames	Harmon-Meek Gallery, Naples, FL	December
2011	Adolf Dehn: A Retrospective	Bonham Creative Arts Center, Manchester Community College, Manchester, CT	April- May
2010	Landscapes from Around the World	Harmon-Meek Gallery, Naples, FL	April
2010	Adolf Dehn, Works on Paper	Burke Gallery, Plattsburgh State Art Museum, Plattsburgh, NY	April
2009	A Touch of Humor	William Benton Museum of Art, University of Connecticut, Storrs, CT	June- July
2009	Adolf Dehn: Love, Labour, Leisure	Mercy Gallery, Richmond Art Center, The Loomis Chaffee School, Windsor, CT	September- October
2008	Politically Incorrect with Adolf Dehn	Harmon-Meek Gallery, Naples, FL	January
2007	Prints and Drawings	Asylum Hill Gallery, Hartford, CT	March
2005	Adolf Dehn Winterscapes	Harmon-Meek Gallery, Naples, FL	December
2005	Works on Paper by Adolf Dehn	Washington Pavilion of Arts and Science, Sioux Falls, SD	December
2004	Adolf Dehn	Springfield Art Museum, Springfield, MO	September
2004	Adolf Dehn: The General Strike, 1926, Pastels of the Rhonda Valley	Susan Teller Gallery, New York, NY	July
2003	Adolf Dehn: Works from the Permanent Collection	Radford University Art Museum, Radford, VA	October
2002	Love, Labor, Leisure	Harmon-Meek Gallery, Naples, FL	March
2002	Love, Labor, Leisure	March Exhibition at the Montclair Art Museum, Montclair, NJ	March
2001	Adolf Dehn in Afghanistan	Harmon-Meek Gallery, Naples, FL	November
1997	A Visit to Tuscany	Harmon-Meek Gallery, Naples, FL	May
1996	Nature & Human Nature: The Art of Adolf Dehn	Alexandria Museum of Art, Alexandria, LA	January
1996	The Humor of Adolf Dehn	The Butler Institute of American Art, Youngtown, OH	March
1996	Adolf Dehn: The Incurable Traveller, Lithographs 1922-1967	Susan Teller Gallery, New York, NY	April
1995	Nature & Human Nature: The Art of A.D.	Louisiana Arts & Science Museum, Baton Rouge, LA	March
1995	Centennial: Adolf Dehn and the American Scene	James J. Hill House, Minnesota Historical Society, Saint Paul, MN	February
1994	Midwest Landscapes by Adolf Dehn	Spiva Center for the Arts, Missouri State University, Joplin, MO	February
1994	Funny People by Adolf Dehn	Harmon-Meek Gallery, Naples, FL	April
1993	Adolf Dehn	Melvin Art Gallery, Florida Southern College, Lakeland, FL	January
1993	The Colorado Work of Adolf Dehn	Elizabeth Schlosser Fine Art, Aspen, CO	February
1993	Modernist Colorado Artists with a Special Focus on Adolf Dehn	Elizabeth Schlosser Fine Art, Aspen, CO	August
1993	Adolf Dehn, The Butler Inst of American Art	Salem Branch Museum, Salem, OR	November
1992	Adolf Dehn Retrospective	Harmon-Meek Gallery, Naples, FL	March
1991	Adolf Dehn	Harmon-Meek Gallery, Naples, FL	April
1991	Adolf Dehn: A Life’s Work 1992-1965	Boca Raton Museum of Art, Boca Raton, FL	November
1990	Adolf Dehn Retrospective	Harmon-Meek Gallery, Naples, FL	January
1990	Funsence: Satirical Drawings and Lithographs by Adolf Dehn	Philharmonic Center for the Arts, Naples, FL	March
1988	Adolf Dehn and American Lithography between the Wars	James J. Hill House, Minnesota Historical Society, Saint Paul, MN	January
1988	Adolf Dehn: A Retrospective of Prints	Associated American Artists Galleries, New York, NY	February
1987	Adolf Dehn Retrospective / American Landscapes in Watercolor	Albany Institute of History and Art, Albany, NY	January
1987	Adolf Dehn Watercolors	Farnsworth Art Museum, Rockland, ME	February
1987	Scene and Satire Supreme: The Lithographs of Adolf Dehn	June 1 Gallery, Bethlehem, PA	November
1987	The Social Graces 1905-41, group exhibition (4 Adolf Dehn works)	The Whitney Museum of American Art, New York, NY	July
1986	Adolf Dehn Retrospective / American Landscapes in Watercolor	Traveling exhibition lent by Harmon-Meek Gallery, Naples, FL	
1986	Adolf Dehn Retrospective / American Landscapes in Watercolor	Muskegon Museum of Art, Muskegon, MN	February
1986	Adolf Dehn Retrospective / American Landscapes in Watercolor	Lakeview Museum of Arts and Sciences, Peoria, IL	April
1986	Adolf Dehn Retrospective / American Landscapes in Watercolor	Amarillo Art Center, Amarillo, TX	June
1986	Adolf Dehn Retrospective / American Landscapes in Watercolor	Louisiana Arts & Science Museum, Baton Rouge, LA	August
1986	Adolf Dehn Retrospective / American Landscapes in Watercolor	Le Sueur County Historical Society, Waterville, MN	October
1986	Adolf Dehn Retrospective / American Landscapes in Watercolor	Dahl Fine Arts Center, Rapid City, SD	December
1985	Adolf Dehn Retrospective / American Landscapes in Watercolor	Traveling exhibition lent by Harmon-Meeks Gallery, Naples, FL	
1985	Adolf Dehn Retrospective / American Landscapes in Watercolor	Hunter Museum of Art, Chattanooga, TN	January
1985	Adolf Dehn Retrospective / American Landscapes in Watercolor	Roanoke Museum of Fine Arts (now Art Museum of Western Virginia), Roanoke, VA	March
1985	Adolf Dehn Retrospective / American Landscapes in Watercolor	Canton Art Institute (now Canton Art Museum), Canton, OH	May
1985	Adolf Dehn Retrospective / American Landscapes in Watercolor	Charles H. MacNider Museum, Mason City, IA	July
1985	Adolf Dehn Retrospective / American Landscapes in Watercolor	Midwest Museum of American Art, Elkhart, IN	September
1985	Adolf Dehn Retrospective / American Landscapes in Watercolor	Zanesville Art Center, Zanesville, OH	October
1985	Adolf Dehn Retrospective / American Landscapes in Watercolor	Sheldon Swope Art Gallery (now Swope Art Museum), Terre Haute, IN	December
1983	Dehn and Dehn	Fine Arts America, Richmond, VA	February
1982	Adolf Dehn and Eliot O’Hara	Harmon-Meek Gallery, Naples, FL; traveling exhibition lent by Harmon-Meek Gallery	April
1982	Adolf Dehn and Eliot O’Hara	Krasl Art Center, St. Joseph, MI	June
1982	Adolf Dehn and Eliot O’Hara	Midwest Museum of American Art, Elkhart, IN	July–August
1982	Adolf Dehn and Eliot O’Hara	Mary Ryan Gallery, New York, NY	November
1981	Adolf Dehn: The Memorial Retrospective	Harmon-Meek Gallery, Naples, FL	March
1979	Adolf Dehn The Full Range	June 1 Gallery, Bethlehem, CT; represented by Hirschl & Adler Galleries, New York, NY	March
1977	Adolf Dehn 1895-1965 Watercolors, Drawings, Lithographs	Jacques Baruch Gallery, Chicago, IL	January
1972	The Many Faces of Adolf Dehn: Lithographs	June 1 Gallery, Bethlehem, CT	July
1970-1971		Represented by Kennedy Galleries, New York, NY	
1969	The Adolf Dehn Exhibition	Carlin Galleries, Fort Worth, TX	July
1969	Adolf Dehn, 1895-1968	Columbus Museum of Art, Columbus, OH	
1968	Retrospective exhibition	Far Gallery, New York, NY	January
1968	Retrospective exhibition	The Century Association, New York, NY	February
1968	Adolf Dehn Paintings and Lithographs	Capricorn Galleries, Bethesda, MD	March
1966	Watercolors by Adolf Dehn	The Museum of Fine Arts and Eastern States Exposition, Springfield, MA	September
1965	New Watercolors	Milch Gallery, New York, NY	March
1965	American Landscape Drawings	Berkshire Museum, Lenox, MA	
1964	Adolf Dehn Retrospective of Lithographs, 1920-1963	Far Gallery, New York, NY	March
1964	Oils, Watercolors, and Prints of Adolf Dehn	Flair House Gallery, Cincinnati, OH	October
1964	The Fabulous Decade	The Free Library of Philadelphia, Philadelphia, NJ	May
1963	The Lithographs of Adolf Dehn	University of Maine Art Gallery, Orono, ME	April
1962	Lithographs by Adolf and Virginia Dehn	Gallery 10, New Hope, PA	April
1962	26 New Lithographs by Adolf Dehn	Associated American Artist Galleries, New York, NY	April
1961	Adolf Dehn Retrospective	University of Missouri Art Department Gallery, Columbia, MO	February
1960	New Casein Paintings	Milch Gallery, New York, NY	October
1958	Thirty Years of Lithography	Krasner Gallery, New York, NY	February
1958	Adolf Dehn Retrospective	University of Missouri Art Department Gallery, MO	February
1957	New Paintings	Milch Gallery, New York, NY	March
1956	New Paintings	Associated American Artists Galleries, New York, NY	February
1955	Watercolors of Adolf Dehn	Carnegie Hall Gallery, University of Maine, Orono, ME	November
1953	Adolf Dehn	Hudson Guild Gallery, New York, NY	November
1951	Haitian World	Associated American Artists Galleries, New York, NY	November
1951	Thirty Lithographs of Adolf Dehn	University of Maine Gallery, Orono, ME	November
1949	Commemorative Exhibition of Adolf Dehn’s Twenty-five Years’ Work in Lithography	Associated American Artists Galleries, New York, NY	September
1948	Exhibition	Whitney Museum of American Art, New York, NY	
1947	Lithographs by Adolf Dehn	Smithsonian Institution, Washington, DC	February
1947	Adolph Dehn: New Lithographs	Associated American Artists Galleries, New York, NY	April
1945		Solo exhibition at national museum, Caracas, Venezuela	
1944	Four American Watercolorists	Museum of Modern Art, New York, NY	
1944	Naval Aviation	Metropolitan Museum of Art, New York, NY	January
1943	International Watercolor Exhibit (awarded first prize)	The Art Institute of Chicago, Chicago, IL	
1943	Naval Aviation	National Gallery of Art, Washington, DC	November
1942	Exhibition	Whitney Museum of American Art, New York, NY	
1941	The Satirical and the Lyrical	Associated American Artists Galleries, New York, NY	March
1940	Watercolors by Adolf Dehn	Weyhe Gallery, New York, NY	
1939	Solo exhibition	Weyhe Gallery, New York, NY	
1938	First watercolor exhibition	Weyhe Gallery, New York, NY	
1938	Annual Exhibition	Whitney Museum of American Art, New York, NY	
1935	Solo exhibition	Weyhe Gallery, New York, NY	
1932	Lithographs by Adolf Dehn	Weyhe Gallery, New York, NY	
1931	Ink Drawings by Adolf Dehn	Weyhe Gallery, New York, NY	
1930	Fifty New Lithographs by Adolf Dehn	Weyhe Gallery, New York, NY	April
1929	Drawings and Lithographs by Adolf Dehn	Weyhe Gallery, New York, NY	February
1928	Solo gallery exhibition	Paris, France	
1925	Drawings by A.D.	Weyhe Gallery, New York, NY	January
1923	Group exhibition	Wurthle and Sohn Gallery, Vienna, Austria	
1923	First solo exhibition	The Weyhe Gallery, New York, NY	April
1915	First museum show (drawings)	Minneapolis Institute of Arts, Minneapolis, MN	

== Sources ==
- Adams, The Sensuous Life of Adolf Dehn, p. 278
- Bald, Wambly. "La Vie de Boheme (As Lived on the West Bank), Chicago Tribune, international Paris edition, March 15, 1932
- Cox, "Adolf Dehn: Satirist of the Jazz Age", p. 13
- Cox, Richard W. "Adolf Dehn the Minnesota Connection," Minnesota Historical Society, 1977, p. 169
- "Dehn, Minneapolis Artist, Wins Vogue in New York, Paris, " Minneapolis Journal, February 25, 1925
- Eliasoph, Phillip. Adolf Dehn: Midcentury Manhattan. The Artist Book Foundation. 2017
- Glassco, John. Memoirs of Montparnasse. New York: New York Reviews of Books Classics, 2001, p. 12-13
- Goodrich, American Watercolor and Winslow Homer, p. 91
- Jones, Arthur F., and Steve Arbury. Adolf Dehn. Radford University Foundation Press, 2003.
- Letter to Emily Dehn, Dehn Family Archives
- Lumsdaine, Jocelyn Pang, and Thomas O'Sullivan. The Prints of Adolf Dehn. St. Paul, MN: Minnesota Historical Society Press, 1987.
