= Virginia Dehn =

American painter and printmaker (1922–2005)

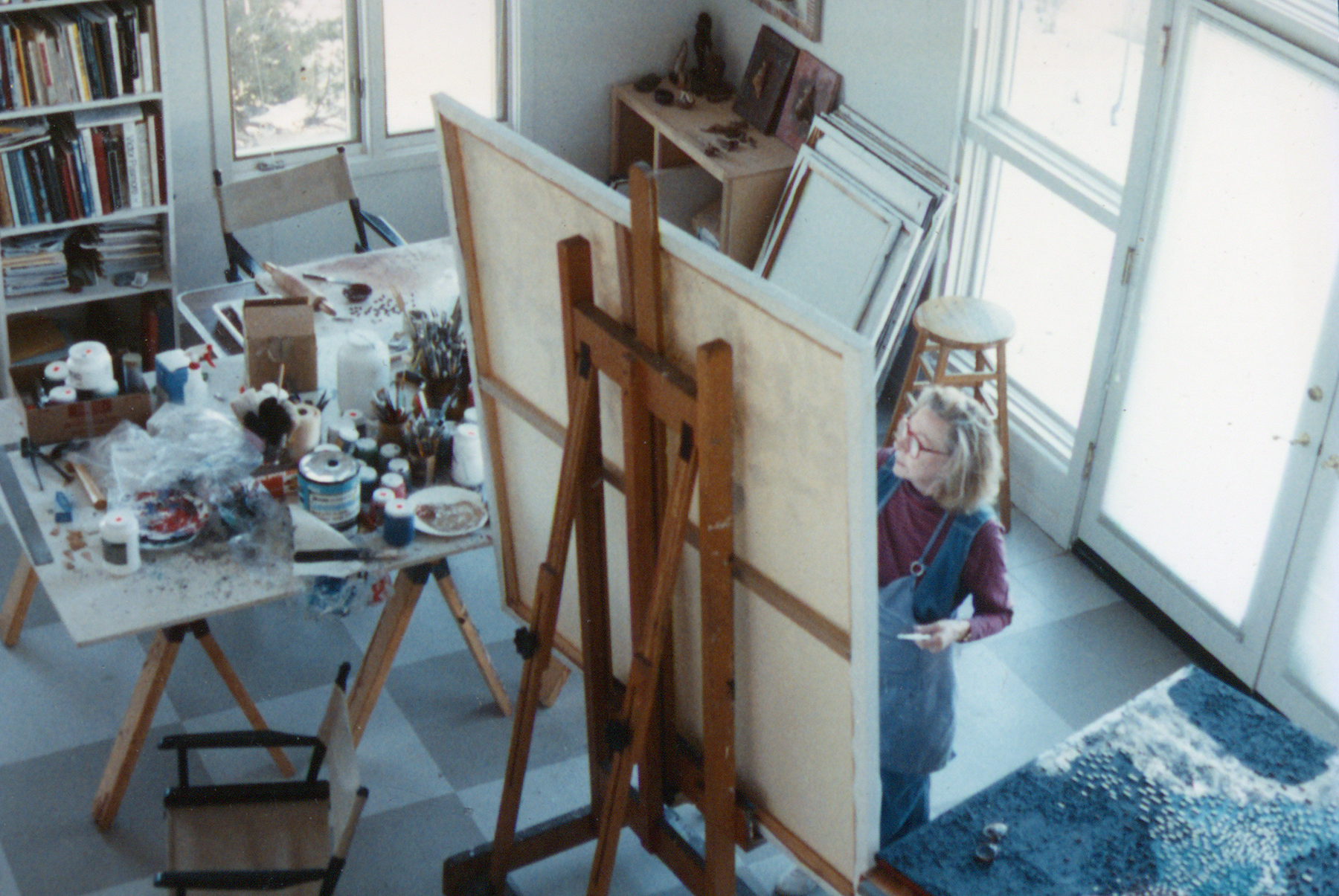
- Virginia Dehn in her studio in Santa Fe
- Born: Virginia Engleman; October 26, 1922; Nevada, Missouri, U.S.
- Died: July 28, 2005 (aged 82); Santa Fe, New Mexico, U.S.
- Education: Stephens College, Traphagen School of Design, Art Students League
- Known for: Painting, printmaking

Virginia Dehn (née Engleman) (October 26, 1922 – July 28, 2005) was an American painter and printmaker. Her work was known for its interpretation of natural themes in almost abstract forms. She exhibited in shows and galleries throughout the U.S. Her paintings are included in many public collections.

== Life ==
Dehn was born in Nevada, Missouri on October 26, 1922. Raised in Hamden, Connecticut, she studied at Stephens College in Columbia, Missouri before moving to New York City. She met the artist Adolf Dehn while working at the Art Students League. They married in November 1947. The two artists worked side by side for many years, part of a group of artists who influenced the history of 20th century American art. Their Chelsea brownstone was a place where artists, writers, and intellectuals often gathered.

=== Early career ===
Virginia Dehn studied art at Stephens College in Missouri before continuing her art education at the Traphagen School of Design, and, later, the Art Students League, both located in New York City. In the mid-1940s while working at the Associated American Artists gallery, she met lithographer and watercolorist Adolf Dehn. Adolf was older than Virginia, and he already enjoyed a successful career as an artist. The two were married in 1947 in a private ceremony at Virginia's parents house in Wallingford, Connecticut.

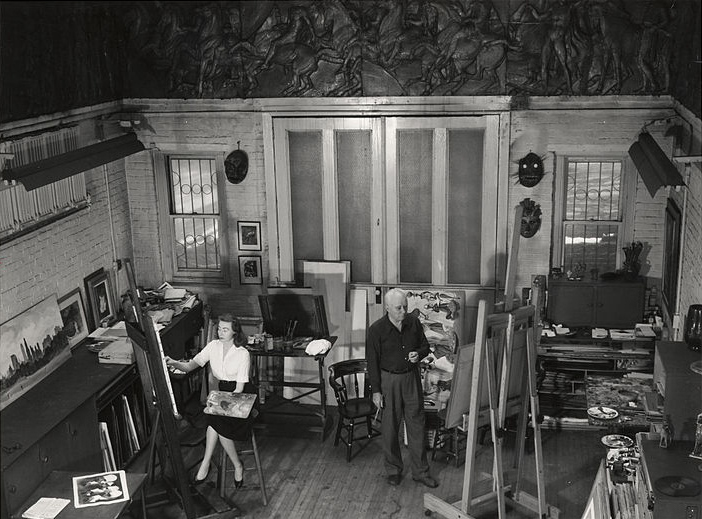
Virginia and Adolf Dehn

The Dehns lived in a Chelsea brownstone on West 21st Street where they worked side by side. They often hosted gatherings of other influential artists and intellectuals of the 20th century. Among their closest friends were sculptor Federico Castellón and his wife Hilda; writer Sidney Alexander and his wife Frances; artists Sally and Milton Avery; Ferol and Bill Smith, also an artist; and Lily and Georges Schreiber, an artist and writer. Bob Steed and his wife Gittel, an anthropologist, were also good friends of the Dehns. According to friend Gretchen Marple Pracht, "Virginia was a glamorous and sophisticated hostess who welcomed visitors to their home and always invited a diverse crowd of guests..." Despite their active social life, the two were disciplined artists, working at their easels nearly daily and taking Saturdays to visit galleries and view new work.

The Dehns made annual trips to France to work on lithographs at the Atelier Desjobert in Paris. Virginia used a bamboo pen to draw directly on the stone for her lithographs, which often depicted trees or still lifes. The Dehns' other travels included visits to Key West, Colorado, Mexico, and countries such as Greece, Haiti, Afghanistan, and India.

Dehn's style of art differend greatly from that of her husband, though the two sometimes exhibited together. A friend of the couple remarked, "Adolf paints landscapes; Virginia paints inscapes." Virginia Dehn generally painted an interior vision based on her feelings for a subject, rather than a literal rendition of it. Many of her paintings consist of several layers, with earlier layers showing through. She found inspiration in the Abstract Expressionism movement that dominated the New York and Paris art scenes in the 1950s. Some of her favorite artists included Adolf Gottileb, Rothko, William Baziotes, Pomodoro, and Antonio Tapies.

Dehn most often worked with bold, vibrant colors in large formats. Her subjects were not literal, but intuitive. She learned new techniques of lithography from her husband Adolf, and did her own prints. Texture was very important to her in her work. Her art was influenced by a variety of sources. In the late 1960s she came across a book that included photographs of organic patterns of life as revealed under a microscope. These images inspired her to change the direction of some of her paintings. Other influences on Dehn's art came from ancient and traditional arts of various cultures throughout the world, including Persian miniatures, illuminated manuscripts, Dutch still life painting, Asian art, ancient Egyptian artifacts, and work by Giotto, Monet, Vuillard, Munch, and Bonnard, mixed with the modernism of the New York art scene. Her husband was a constant inspiration until his death in 1968.

=== Later career ===
In the 1970s, Dehn began making large mixed media paintings with overlays of clay and acrylic She moved from New York City to Santa Fe in 1985. She enjoyed the sense of space and calm there that could not be found in New York City. After moving to New Mexico, some of her paintings began to take on a sculptural quality, as she began working more with materials such as clay and metallic substances into her paintings. The metallic colors she used in some works showed her interest in the interaction of light and matter. The petroglyphs of the southwest interested her, and along with her study of ancient artifacts from Egypt and Asia. Some of her works began to feature what looked like hieroglyphics.

During her artistic career, Dehn received fellowships from Yaddo, MacDowell Colony and Ossabaw Island Project. Her work was exhibited in shows and galleries throughout the country, and her paintings are part of many public collections. A traveling show sponsored by the Albuquerque Museum of Art and History called "Layerists in Multi-media" included her paintings. She was given the Salmagundi Club prize for a still life painting in 1968 by the National Academy of Design.

In her later years, Dehn continued to create as she retained a circle of devoted friends and admirers. Despite health struggles, she kept painting until her death at her home in Santa Fe on July 26, 2005. Her work is currently represented by Thomas French Fine Art and the Bundy Modern.

== Works ==
=== Series ===
Series of works created by Virginia Dehn include:

- Gardens and Galaxies Series
- Ancient Landscape Series
- Clay Pot Series
- Earth Memory Series
- Metaphysical Series
- The Gold Series
- The Oriental Series
- The Egyptian Series

=== Prints ===
Dehn learned lithography from her husband, renowned lithographer Adolf Dehn. Her own lithographs often depicted trees and still lifes.

=== Paintings ===
Dehn once stated, "Painting is my life. It has always been so." In her dedication to art Virginia used her creativity to be an inspiration to many.

=== Other works and photos ===
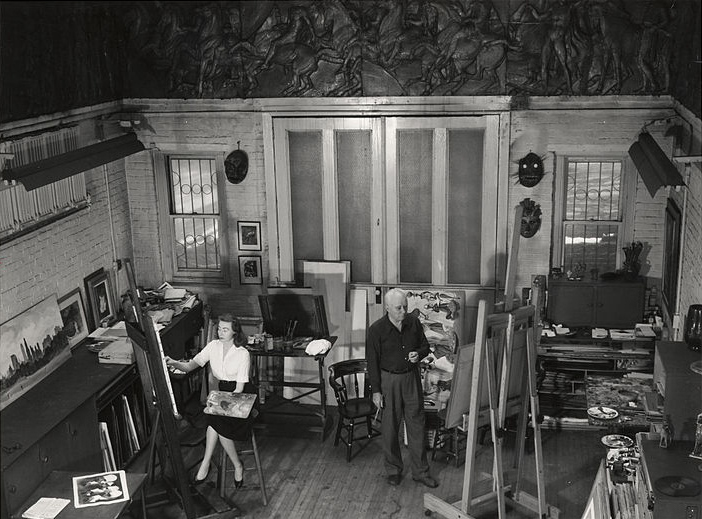
Adolf and Virginia Dehn in the 1940s

== Collections ==
Some of the institutions that hold works by Virginia Dehn in their permanent collections are the New York State Library, the State of Minnesota Historical Society, the Museum of Fine Art in Springfield, Massachusetts, The University of California—Berkeley, the New Mexico Museum of Art, the Butler Institute of American Art in Youngstown, Ohio, and the Portland, Oregon Art Museum.

== Exhibition history ==
Galleries that have represented Virginia Dehn include:

- Susan Teller Gallery (New York, NY)
- Harmon Meek Gallery (Naples, FL)
- Cline LewAllen Contemporary Gallery (Santa Fe, NM)
- Thomas French Fine Art (Fairlawn, OH)
