= Audubon House =

Audubon House may refer to:

- Audubon House and Tropical Gardens, in Key West, Florida.
- Audubon House, in Vero Beach, Florida
- "Audubon House", the former headquarters of the National Audubon Society, in Manhattan, New York City
