= Malcolm H. Myers =

American painter, printmaker and professor

Malcolm Haynie Myers
- Born: June 19, 1917; Lucerne, Missouri
- Died: March 14, 2002 (aged 84)
- Known for: Intaglio printmaking painting teaching

Malcolm Haynie Myers (June 19, 1917 – March 14, 2002) was an American painter, printmaker and professor known primarily for his Intaglio-style engravings. His work is included in numerous museum collections.

== Early life and education ==
Myers was born on June 19, 1917, in Lucerne, Missouri. He grew up there until his early teen years, when his family moved to West Texas during the Great Depression so his father could work in the oil fields near McCamey, Texas. They stayed there until the mid-1930s when they moved to the Wichita, Kansas area.

With help from a family friend, Myers entered the art program at Wichita State University, where he studied under renowned landscape, seascape, and still-life painter Clayton Staples. He completed a bachelor of fine arts degree from Wichita State University in 1939 and continued on to earn his master of fine arts degree in watercolor in 1941.

After graduation, Myers joined the US Merchant Marine to fight in World War II. He trained at Catalina Island, California, and attended Officers School in Sheepshead Bay, New York. During this time, Myers married his longtime Kansas girlfriend Roberta King.

After the war, they stayed on in New York City, where he explored his interest in jazz and blues, which were influential in his works of art. He enrolled in graduate school at the University of Iowa in Iowa City to study under painter Grant Wood. During his studies at Iowa, he met Argentinean Print Master Mauricio Lasansky—known as “the nation’s most influential printmaker”—who was there on a Guggenheim fellowship. Myers taught with Lasansky for two years and eventually became a master printmaker himself. In 1946, Myers earned a second master of fine arts degree, this time in printmaking. Myers and Lasansky shared a lifelong friendship, with Myers being the godparent to Lasansky's son.

== Career ==
In 1948 he joined the art faculty at the University of Minnesota. There, he started the printmaking department in Jones Hall.

In 1951, Myers received a Guggenheim Fellowship (renewed in 1952) and worked in Stanley William (Bill) Hayter’s iconic printmaking studio, Atelier 17, in Paris. There, he met and collaborated with Jaques Desjobert, Joan Miró, Enrique Zañartu, and other artists who were involved in the art of printmaking.

Then, in 1954, Myers received a second Guggenheim Fellowship, this time to work in Mexico City, Mexico. There, he met Diego Rivera and became interested in pre-Columbian art. He also renewed his friendship with Mexican painter Rufino Tamayo, whom he had met in Paris at Jacques Desjobert & Sons, a famous lithography workshop.^{[4]}

== Personal life ==
When his wife Roberta died in 1992, Myers stopped traveling to focus on his art and teaching. In 1996, Myers married artist Marilyn Jenneman. He continued teaching and conducted two or more classes each semester at the University of Minnesota until his death. He died March 14, 2002, aged 84.

== Awards and honors ==
- 1950 John Simon Guggenheim Fellowship
- 1954 John Simon Guggenheim Fellowship
- 1968 Brooklyn Museum Purchase Award
- 1973 Wichita State University, Alumni Achievement Award

== Collections ==
- The Brooklyn Museum, New York, NY
- Cincinnati Art Museum, OH
- Coos Art Museum, Coos Bay, OR
- Library of Congress
- National Gallery of Art, Washington, D.C.
- The Minneapolis Institute of Arts, Minneapolis, MN
- The New York Public Library, New York, NY
- Newfields (Indianapolis Museum of Art)
- Philadelphia Museum of Art, Philadelphia, PA
- Ulrich Museum of Art, Wichita State University, Wichita, Kansas
- Seattle Art Museum, Seattle, WA
- Walker Art Center, Minneapolis, MN
- Weisman Museum, University of Minnesota, MN
- St. Catherine University
