= C'mon =

C'mon, short for "come on", may refer to:

== Music ==
=== Bands ===
- C'mon (band), a Canadian rock band, formed in 2003

=== Albums ===
- C'mon (Low album)
- C'mon (B'z album)
- C'mon! (Keith Anderson album)

=== Songs ===
- "C'Mon" (Kesha song), 2012
- "C'Mon" (Mario song), 2003
- "C'Mon" (The Screaming Jets song), 1990
- "C'mon/Jo-Anna Says", a 2005 single by Per Gessle
- "C'mon" (Tiësto and Diplo song), 2010
  - "C'mon (Catch 'em by Surprise)", a remake of the song with additional vocals by Busta Rhymes, 2011
- "C'mon", a song on Guster's 2006 Ganging Up on the Sun
- "C'mon", a song on Devo's 1984 album Shout
- "C'mon", a song by Junior Senior from their 2003 album D-D-Don't Don't Stop the Beat
- "C'mon", a 2011 split single by Panic! at the Disco and the band fun.
- "C'mon", a song on the Rustic Overtones album ¡Viva Nueva! and Elmin Karisik

== Other uses ==
- C'MON, a 1960s New Zealand television series featuring Suzanne Lynch
- CMON Limited, a Singaporean company
- Golisano Children's Museum of Naples, known as C'mon

== See also ==
- Come On (disambiguation)
- C'mon C'mon (disambiguation)
