= Come On In =

Come On In may refer to:

== Music ==
- Come On In (album), by R. L. Burnside, or the title song, 1998
- "Come On In" (The Oak Ridge Boys song), 1978
- "Come On In (You Did the Best You Could Do)", another song by the Oak Ridge Boys, 1985
- "Come On In", a song by the Association from Birthday, 1968
- "Come On In", a song by the Blues Band, 1980
- "Come On In", a song by Jerry Lee Lewis from Country Memories, 1977
- "Come On In", a song by KC and the Sunshine Band from Part 3, 1976
- "Come On In", a song by Patsy Cline, 1958
- "Come On In", a song by Rick Nelson from In Concert at the Troubadour, 1969, 1970
- "Come On In", a song by Sean Garrett from Turbo 919, 2008
- "Come On In", a song by Sparklehorse from Good Morning Spider, 1998

== Other uses ==
- Come On In (film), a 1918 American comedy silent film
- Come On In, a 2020 book by Adi Alsaid

== See also ==
- Come On (disambiguation)
