= Shady, New York =

Hamlet in New York, United States

Coordinates: 42°03′59″N 74°09′34″W

Shady is a hamlet in Ulster County, New York, United States. It is part of the town of Woodstock and lies on New York State Route 212.

The community was named for the fact nearby high ridges often block direct sunlight.

== Notable people ==
- Albert Grossman (1926–1986), music producer and manager for Bob Dylan, Paul Butterfield, and Janis Joplin
- Henry Cowell, composer (1897–1965)
- Sidney Robertson Cowell, folk song collector and wife of Henry Cowell (1903–1995)
- Alf Evers, local historian (1905–2004)
- Andrée Ruellan, painter (1905–2006)
- Henny Youngman, comedian (1906–1998)
- Charles Libove, violinist (1926–2008)
- Nina Lugovoy, pianist (1929-2024)
