= Alf Evers =

American historian

Alf Evers (February 2, 1905 – December 29, 2004) was an American historian who lived in Ulster County, New York for much of his life and wrote lengthy, definitive histories of the Catskills and Woodstock, serving the latter as town historian. At the time of his death his history of Kingston was nearly complete and awaited publication.

== Biography ==
Evers was born in the Bronx neighborhood of Williamsbridge and lived there till the age of nine, when his parents moved to a farm near Tillson. He developed a passion for history from the many stories of the farmhands, the work of British naturalist Gilbert White and collecting Native American arrowheads with one of his high school teachers in New Paltz.

He attended Hamilton College and, after graduation, returned to the city and the Art Students League, where he met his wife, illustrator Helen Baker. They eventually settled in Litchfield, Connecticut, where they wrote and illustrated 50 children's books together, most telling fables in a simple prose style that earned comparisons to Aesop, and raised three children Jane, Barbara and Christopher Evers.

In 1950 he and his wife divorced. He chose to return to Ulster and begin the first of three histories that would define his later career.

The Catskills: From Wilderness to Woodstock, published in 1972 (with a later afterword to the 1984 edition), is a comprehensive 720-page history of a region that had previously been lacking for one. Extensive research went into covering every aspect of a long and tangled story, with special attention paid to the folklore that Evers had first heard from inhabitants of the region as a boy.

His home in Shady, New York, which served as a Catskills museum, library, and archive, has been listed on the State Registry of Historic Places. A park honoring Alf Evers is located outside the Woodstock Historical Society museum on Comeau Drive in the town of Woodstock, New York. Evers' library of over 1,000 books is owned by the Woodstock Byrdcliffe Guild.
