= Come On Come On (disambiguation) =

Come On Come On is a 1992 album by Mary Chapin Carpenter.

Come On Come On and variants may also refer to:

== Music ==
- C'mon, C'mon (album), a 2002 album by Sheryl Crow, and the title track
- "Come On Come On" (Little Birdy song), 2006
- "Come On, Come On" (Smash Mouth song), 1999
- "C'mon! C'mon!" (Bronski Beat song), 1986
- "C'mon C'mon" (The Von Bondies song), 2004
- "Come On Come On", a 1965 B-side by The Esquires, also covered by The A-Bones in 1993
- "Come On Come On", a 1966 B-side by Freddy Cannon
- "Come On, Come On", a 1977 song by Cheap Trick from In Color
- "Come On, Come On", a 1982 song by Billy Idol from his eponymous album.
- "Come On, Come On", a 1991 song by The Black Sorrows
- "Come On Come On", a 1992 song by Mary Chapin Carpenter from her album Come On Come On (1992)
- "Come On Come On", a 1997 song by Sleeper
- "Come On Come On", a 2020 single by Almost Monday
- "C'mon C'mon", a 1958 single by Della Reese
- "C'mon C'mon", a 1970 song by Slade released as B-side to "Shape of Things to Come"
- "C'mon C'mon", a song by Def Leppard from their 2008 album Songs from the Sparkle Lounge
- "C'mon, C'mon", a song by One Direction from their 2012 album Take Me Home

== Other ==
- C'mon C'mon (film), a 2021 American drama film

== See also ==
- C'mon (disambiguation)
- Come On (disambiguation)
- "Come On, Come In", 1959 song by Carmen McRae
- "Come On, Come On", refrain chanted by the crowd to Gary Glitter's "I'm the Leader of the Gang (I Am)"
- “Please Please Me”, which includes the refrain come on, come on before the chorus.
