= Come On =

Come On may refer to:

== Music ==
- Come On (EP), by Elf Power, 1999
- "Come On" (Billy Lawrence song), 1997
- "Come On" (Christine Anu song), 1995
- "Come On" (Chuck Berry song), 1961; covered by the Rolling Stones, 1963
- "Come On" (CNBLUE song), 2012
- "Come On" (Earl King song), 1960
- "Come On" (The Jesus and Mary Chain song), 1994
- "Come On" (Kish Mauve song), 2009; covered by Will Young, 2011
- "Come On" (The New Power Generation song), 1998
- "S&M" (song), a 2011 song by Rihanna also known by the censored title "Come On"
- "Come On", a song by Barry White from The Icon Is Love, 1994
- "Come On", a song by Chelsea from Alternative Hits, 1980
- "Come On", a song by City Girls and Saweetie from the compilation Control the Streets, Volume 2, 2019
- "Come On", a song by Crazy Frog from Everybody Dance Now, 2009
- "Come On", a song by Green River Ordinance from Out of My Hands, 2009
- "Come On", a song by Hell on Wheels, 2006
- "Come On!", a song by the Hives from Lex Hives, 2012
- "Come On", a song by the Hours from See the Light, 2009
- "Come On", a song by Jhené Aiko from Chilombo, 2020
- "Come On", a song by Jimmy Somerville from Home Again, 2004
- "Come On", a song by Krokus from Metal Rendez-vous, 1980
- "Come On", a song by Living Colour from Shade, 2017
- "Come On", a song by Los Saicos, 1965
- "Come On", a song by Moloko from Statues, 2003
- "Come On", a song by Mushroomhead from Beautiful Stories for Ugly Children, 2010
- "Come On", a song by Shiga Lin, 2014
- "Come On", a song by Tommy Roe, 1964
- "Come On", a song by the Verve from Urban Hymns, 1997
- "Come On", a song by Wham! from Fantastic, 1983
- "Come On", a song by White Lies from Friends, 2016
- "Come On/Let's Go", a song by Paul Weller from As Is Now, 2005
- "Come On, Let's Go", a song by Ritchie Valens from the self-titled album, 1959
- "Come On and Love Me", a song by Lenny Kravitz from Are You Gonna Go My Way, 1993

== Other uses ==
- "Come On" (How I Met Your Mother), a television episode
- The Come On, a 1956 American film starring Anne Baxter

== See also ==
- Come On Come On (disambiguation)
- C'mon (disambiguation)
- Common (disambiguation)
