= La Salle University Art Museum =

Museum in Philadelphia, Pennsylvania, US

Coordinates: 40.03733°N 75.15234°W

The La Salle University Art Museum is located in the basement of Olney Hall at La Salle University in Philadelphia, Pennsylvania. The museum features six galleries. Collections include European and American art from the Renaissance to the present. Special collections including paper, Japanese prints, rare illustrated Bibles, Indian miniatures, African carvings and implements, Pre-Columbian pottery and Ancient Greek ceramics. Changing exhibits are held of historic and contemporary art drawn from the collections and from outside collections.

== Collections ==
The museum is home to the Walking Madonna, one of four sculptures by the British artist Dame Elisabeth Frink. Frink created the sculpture in 1981; the other Walking Madonna sculptures remain in England, with one in Salisbury and the other in Frink's garden at her home.

=== Rembrandt Peale ===
La Salle University Art Museum contains works from the historic Peale family of Philadelphia. Rembrandt Peale's self-portrait is a part of the La Salle Art Museum's collection. Rembrandt Peale was the third child of the six surviving children of Charles Willson Peale. Born in Bucks County, Pennsylvania, in 1778, he spent most of his career in Philadelphia as an American artist. Rembrandt Peale's most notable works are those that he painted alongside his father Charles Willson Peale of political figures such as George Washington and Thomas Jefferson.

Rembrandt Peale left a lasting impression on the community in which he lived. He started an art program at Central High School of Philadelphia as the school's first and only Professor of Drawing and Writing at the time. For the first two years of Central's art program, students used the book Graphics that Rembrandt Peale had authored. Peale was a follower of the Swiss educator Johann Pestalozzi, who theorized that writing and drawing skills required similar intellectual and physical transactions.

Peale contributed more than 100 portraits of the political figure George Washington during his career. These portraits were painted in a wide range of sizes, including Rembrandt's neoclassical Patriae Pater (father of his country) or "porthole" portrait and his full-length equestrian image.

=== Proposed art sale ===
In early 2018, La Salle University announced plans to sell forty-six artworks from the museum to "help fund teaching and learning initiatives in its new strategic plan". Among the art the museum planned to sell were the Walking Madonna, Jean-Auguste-Dominique Ingres’s Virgil Reading the Aeneid Before Augustus from 1865; Dorothea Tanning’s Temptation of St. Anthony; Georges Rouault’s Le Dernier Romantique (The Last Romantic); and Albert Gleizes’s Man in the City (L’Homme Dans la Ville). Selling art to fund the university concerned the art community and the plan was criticized by artists and museum groups. The national Association of Art Museum Directors, imposed sanctions saying "sanctions will remain in place unless the institutions decide to use the proceeds to acquire art."

== Selected works in the museum ==
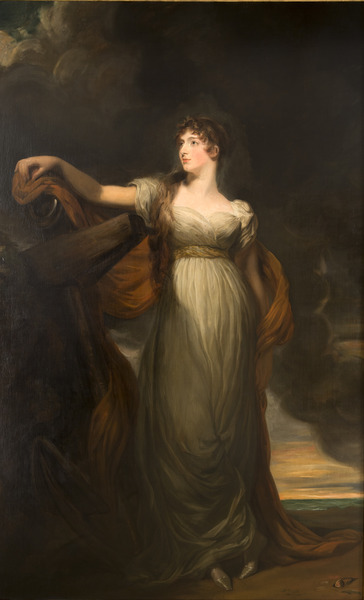
Lady Louisa, 1830, by Thomas Lawrence

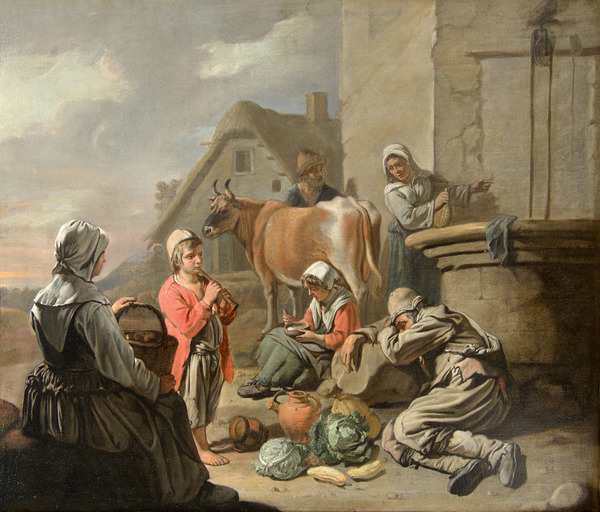
Peasants resting at a well, 17th century, Abraham Willemsens

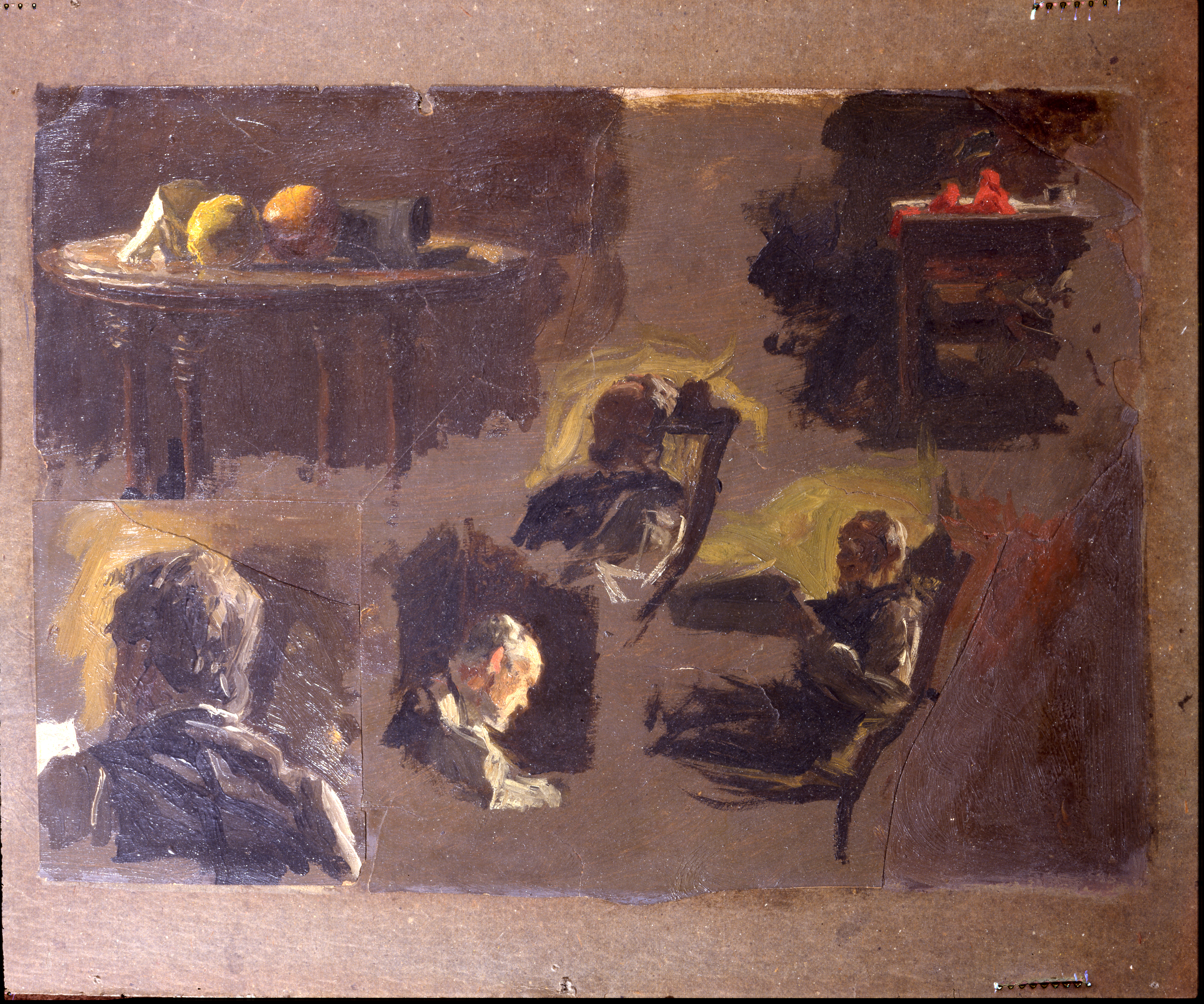
Group of sketches by Thomas Eakins

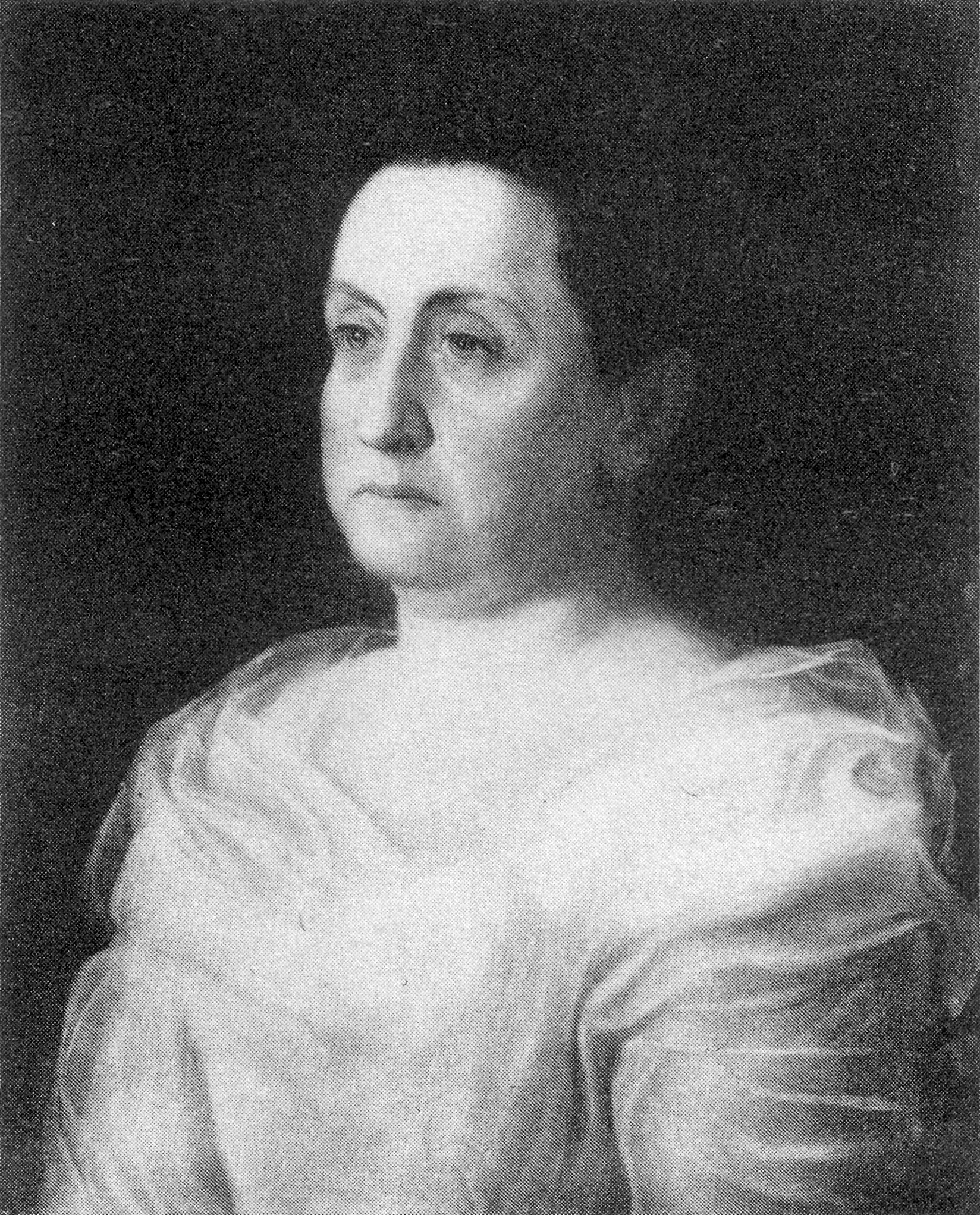
Matilda Searight by Thomas Eakins
