= Atelier Desjobert =

Printmaking workshop in Paris, France

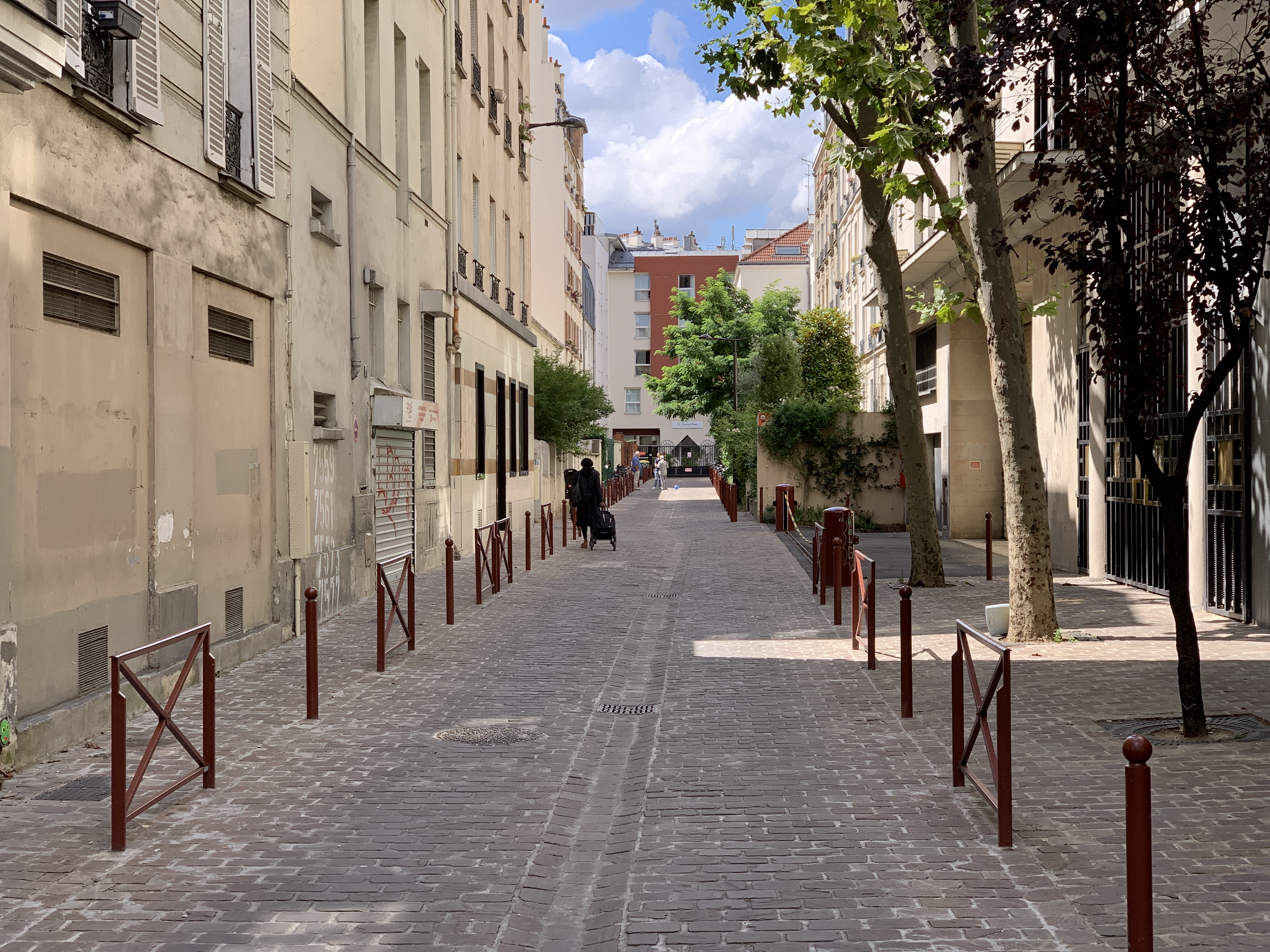
- Villa Coeur-de-Vey, most notable site of the Atelier Desjobert in Paris
- Founded: 1923
- Founder: Edmond Desjobert
- Type: Lithography studio
- Location: Paris, France
- Products: Fine-art lithographs, posters
- Key people: Jacques Desjobert

The Atelier Desjobert was a Parisian printmaking workshop, founded in 1923 by Edmond Charles Léon Desjobert. Grounded in traditional lithographic techniques, it became an influential centre for experimentation in printmaking in the 20th century and was notably popular with British and American artists.

Among those who worked there were Pablo Picasso, Andrée Ruellan, Stanley William Hayter, Adolf Dehn, Marie Laurencin, and Louis Lozowick.

== History ==
Edmond Desjobert was born on 23 March 1888 in Sarthe, France. He trained as a master lithographer before founding Atelier Desjobert in Paris at 59 rue du Moulin‑Vert in Paris. The studio relocated several times within the Montparnasse area of Paris, eventually settling at 10 Villa Cœur‑de‑Vey. Upon Desjobert's death in 1953, his son Jacques Desjobert, who had trained in the atelier since childhood, took over.

Under their guidance, the Atelier Desjobert became known not only for technical excellence but also for fostering a collegial, collaborative environment between artists and artisans.

== The studio ==
After the War, Atelier Desjobert occupied two wide floors of a building at the end of a narrow impasse known as the Villa Cœur-de-Vey, on the outskirts of Montparnasse. The ground floor contained preparation areas, including tables for graining lithographic stones, while the first floor housed the main studio, filled with "some ten simple lithographic presses [...] with inking slabs, rollers, and stacks of paper".

The atelier had a distinctive, collaborative atmosphere. “Papa Desjobert” (Edmond) and his son Jacques oversaw work and fostered close relationships between artisans and visiting artists. Visiting printmakers worked at tables against the windows, while staff assisted with stone preparation, printing trials, and retouching. Stanley William Hayter noted that these employees "in some cases assist and instruct inexperienced artists in the fairly simple operations to be carried out, but [though] seldom do the actual work on the stones."

Artists from around the world visited Desjobert's studio, with American printmakers especially drawn to its techniques as they were largely inaccessible in the United States. Hayter observed participants from France, England, Switzerland, Spain, Holland, Belgium, Italy, Japan, and South America, while a visiting journalist highlighted the presence of Canadian artists such as Albert Dumouchel, Paul Beaulieu, Léon Bellefleur, Jack Nichols, and Bernard Vanier. The studio also printed works for European modernists including Braque; Max Ernst; Clavé; Singier; Lurçat; Zao Wou-Ki; and Villon.

== Works printed by the Atelier Desjobert ==
The Atelier Desjobert produced a number of significant lithographs and limited-edition prints over the 20th century. Documented examples include:

- c. 1927: Hoboken by Louis Lozowick, printer Desjobert. (Smithsonian American Art Museum)
- 1928: Paris Lithographs by Adolf Dehn, printed at Atelier Desjobert. (National Gallery of Art)
- 1928: Flowers in Window by Yasuo Kuniyoshi, printed by Desjobert. (Whitney Museum of American Art)
- c. 1929: The Painter and his Model by Pablo Picasso, printed by Desjobert. (Art Institute Chicago)
- 1929: Tunisia by Howard Cook, printer Desjobert. (Smithsonian American Art Museum)
- 1930: Alice Outside the White Rabbit's House from Alice in Wonderland, printer Desjobert (MoMA)
- 1930: L’Inscription anglaise by Giorgio de Chirico, printed at Atelier Desjobert. (Musée d’art et d’histoire de Genève)
- 1932: Circus by Andrée Ruellan, printed by Edmond Desjobert. (Amon Carter Museum of American Art)
- 1933: Primary Accumulation: The Slave Trade: from Karl Marx Capital In Pictures by Hugo Gellert, printed by E. Desjobert. (Annex Galleries)
- 1946: L'arme secrète (Secret Weapon) by André Masson, lithograph Desjobert (Toledo Museum)
- 1950: Untitled from the portfolio Jean Arp, Sonia Delaunay, Alberto Magnelli and Sophie Taeuber-Arp, print studio of Edmond and Jacques Desjobert (Museum of Fine Arts, Houston)
- 1950: Dancers by Max Ernst, printed by Desjobert (Umma)
- 1951: Montagnes et soleil (Mountains and sun) by Zao Wou-Ki, printer E. and J. Desjobert. (MoMA)
- 1954: Jardin la Nuit (Garden at Night) by Zao Wou‑Ki, printed by E & J Desjobert. (Michali Gallery)
- 1962: Illustrations for Helmut Heissenbüttel's Roman by Armin Sandig, printed by Desjobert. (Toledo Museum)
- 1969: The Song of Songs Which is Solomon's by Paul Wunderlich, printed at Atelier Desjobert. (National Gallery of Art)
