= Audubon House and Tropical Gardens =

Audubon House & Tropical Gardens
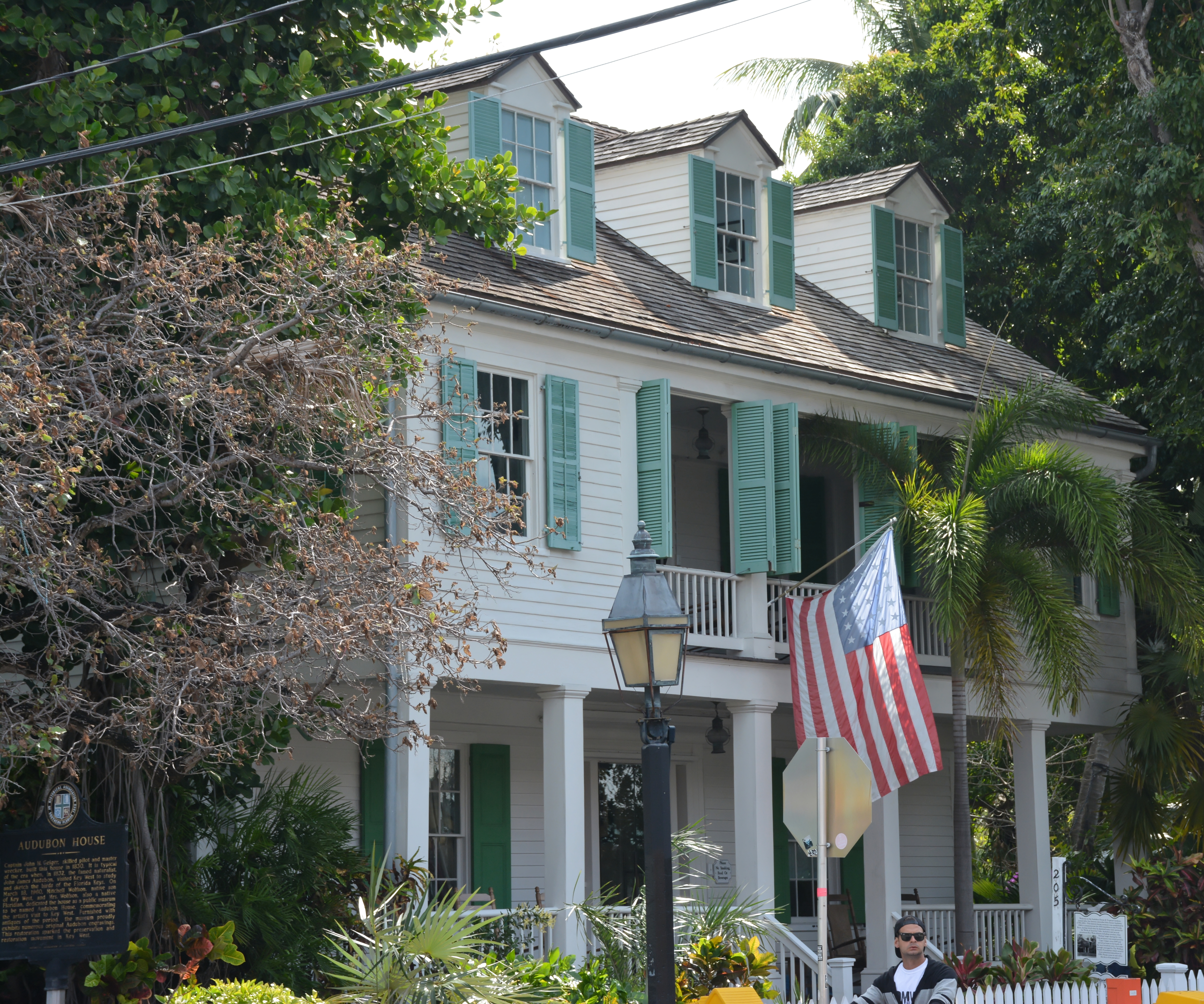
- Location: 205 Whitehead Street; Key West, Florida
- Coordinates: 24.558316°N 81.806117°W
- Type: History
- Website: www.audubonhouse.com

The Audubon House & Tropical Gardens is located at 205 Whitehead Street, Key West, Florida.

Brick-pathed gardens offer a lush 1-acre (4,000 m^{2}) view of orchids, bromeliads, and other tropical foliage, an herb garden and 1840-style nursery.

The house has many antique furnishings purchased from estate sales and auctions in Europe.

The house contains 28 first-edition works of the famous ornithologist John James Audubon. Audubon visited the Florida Keys and Dry Tortugas in 1832 and left Key West having sighted and drawn 18 new birds for his "Birds of America" folio. It is believed that many of those drawings were conceived in the Audubon House garden. Also, Audubon's painting of the white-crowned pigeon features the Geiger tree found in the front yard of the house.

The Audubon House Gallery, separate from the main house features a unique collection of 19th century original Audubon art and a comprehensive selection of John James Audubon's images.

== History ==
The house was slated for demolition in 1958, but was saved by the Mitchell Wolfson Family Foundation, a nonprofit educational institution. This was the first restoration project in Key West.

The Audubon House Museum & Tropical Gardens was established in 1960 by Key West native, Colonel Mitchell Wolfson and his wife Frances. They invested $250,000, with celebrated architect and developer Alfred Milton Evans and his sons Harry, John, Alfred Evans who restored the Audubon house using building techniques of their father Sidney Evans, a known big ship builder. The Evanses' 2-3 story estate houses dot the Key West landscape and can be recognized by their customary circular wooden accents and grand multi-poled verandas. Alfred Evans used a special shipbuilding technique of gradually bending the wood for circular archways and stairways. Most of Key West's landmark homes were built by The Evanses, who lived in a grand 3-story home on 716 Olivia in Old Key West, a few doors from Ernest Hemingway's home, whose book Old Man in the Sea was inspired by his experiences in Key West and the Evans family. The Evanes restored the three level Captain's home, which was built in the American Classic Revival architectural style of the mid-1800s. The home was originally built by Captain John Huling Geiger, who was Key West's first harbor pilot. Captain Geiger raised many children in the house, and planted beautiful tropical vegetation on the property. It was the beautiful plants which drew Audubon to it during his visit in 1832. Audubon took cuttings from the plants growing on the property, and used them as backgrounds in many works, including the White crowned Pigeon, which has the "Geiger tree" in the background.

This was the first restoration project in Key West and is still considered the gem of the island's restoration movement. Antique enthusiasts who tour the house appreciate the unique quality of the furnishings, which were typically found in a prosperous Key West home in the 1800s.

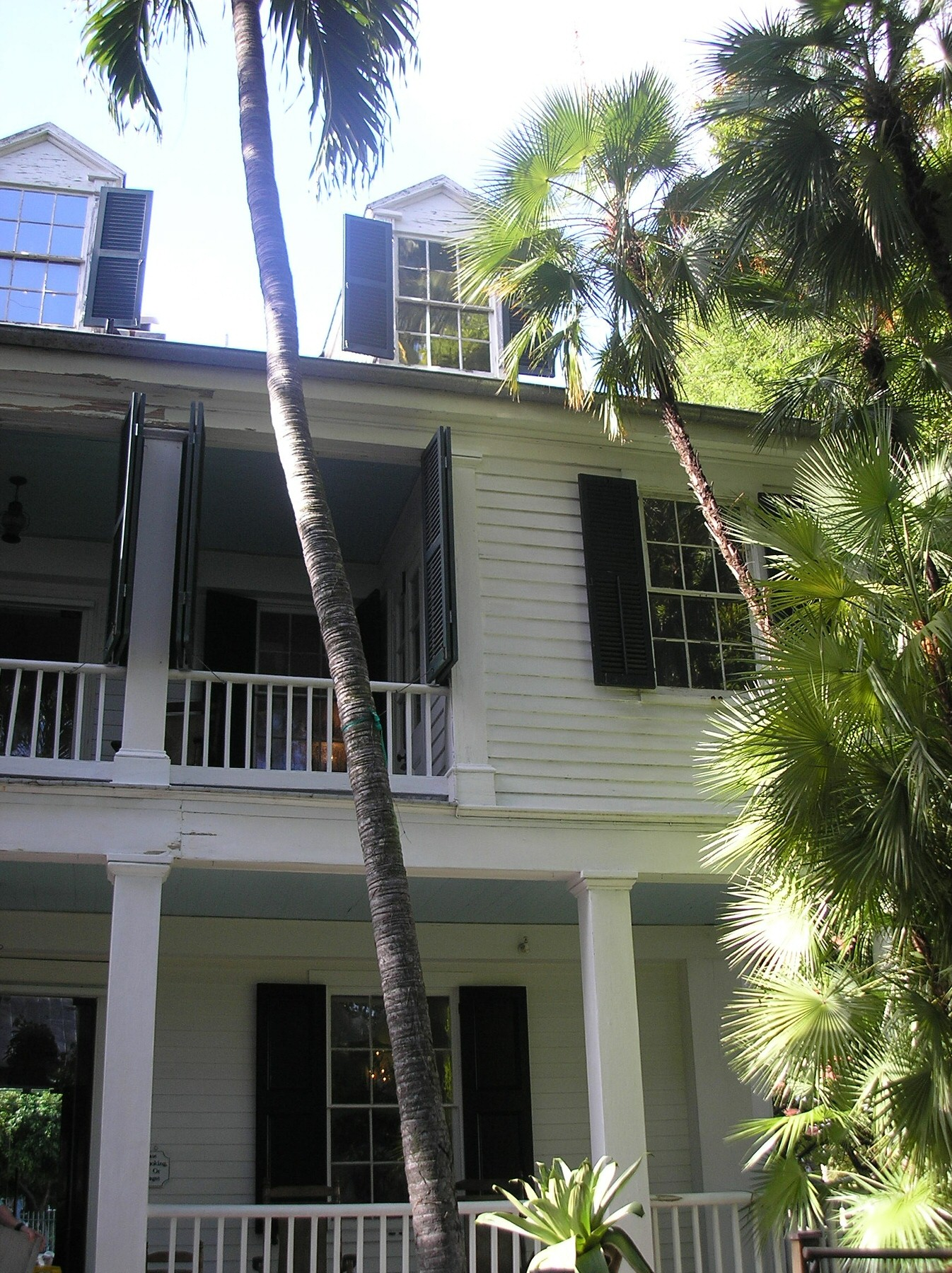
The house

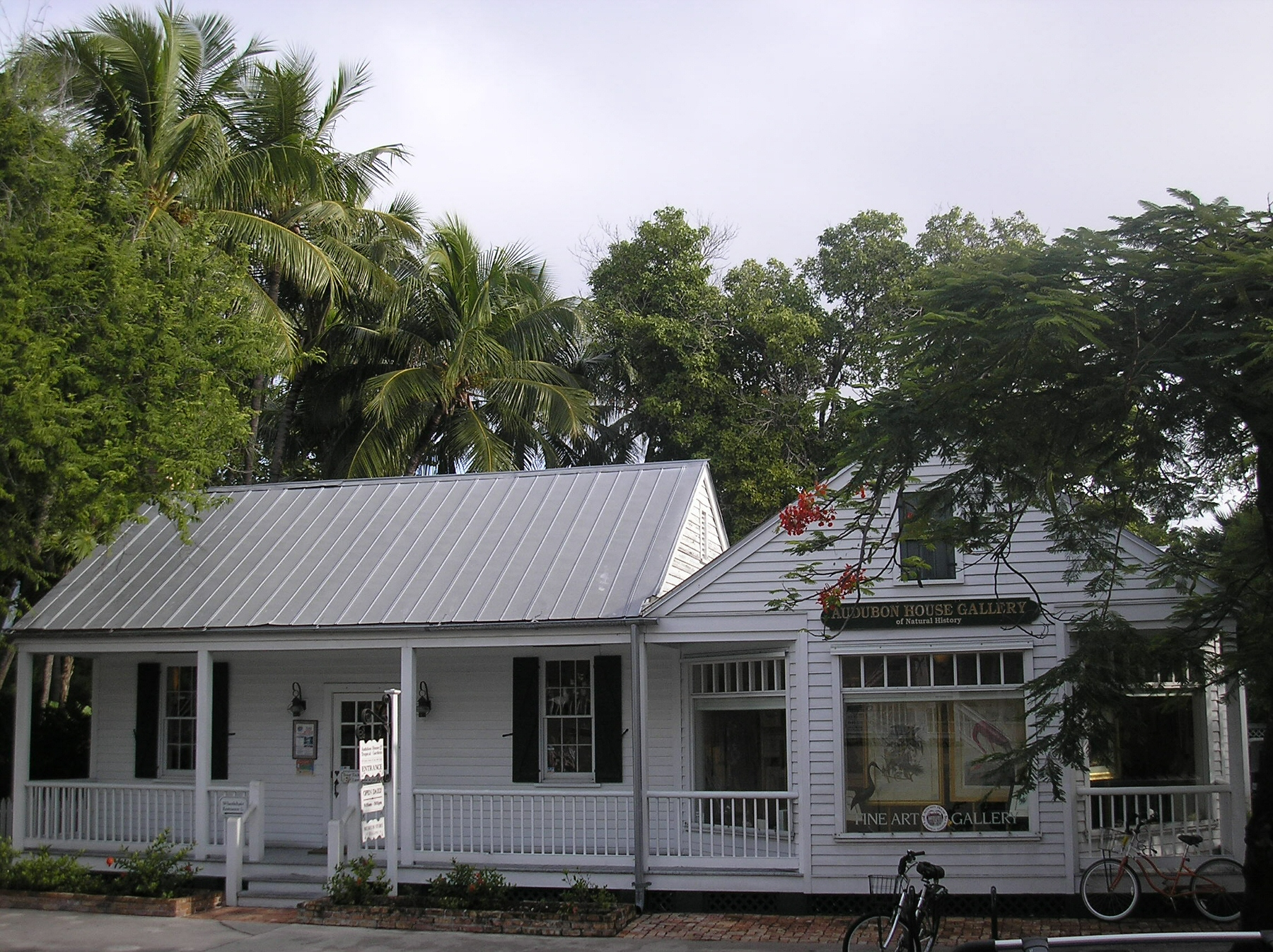
The nearby gallery

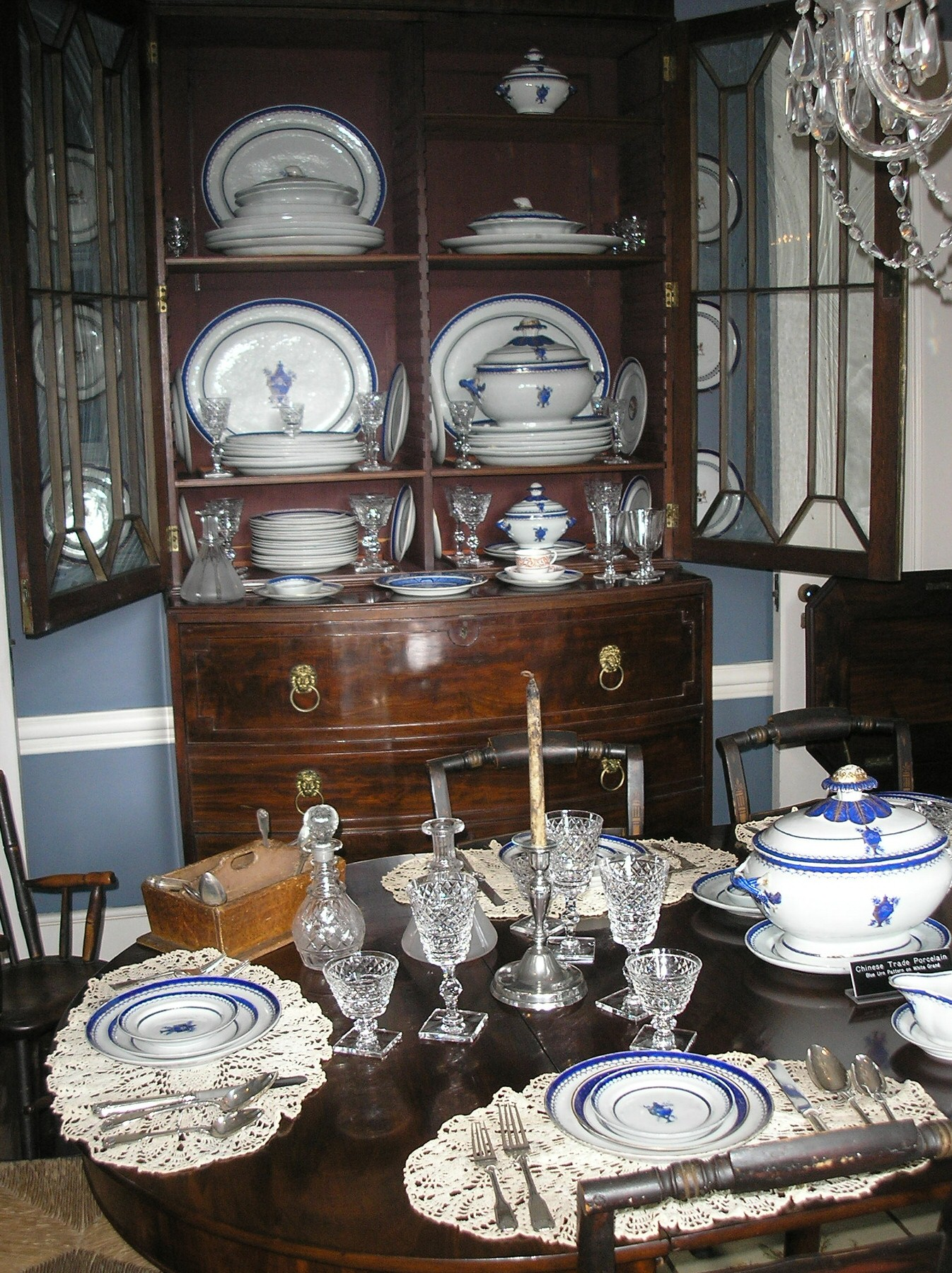
The dining room on the first floor

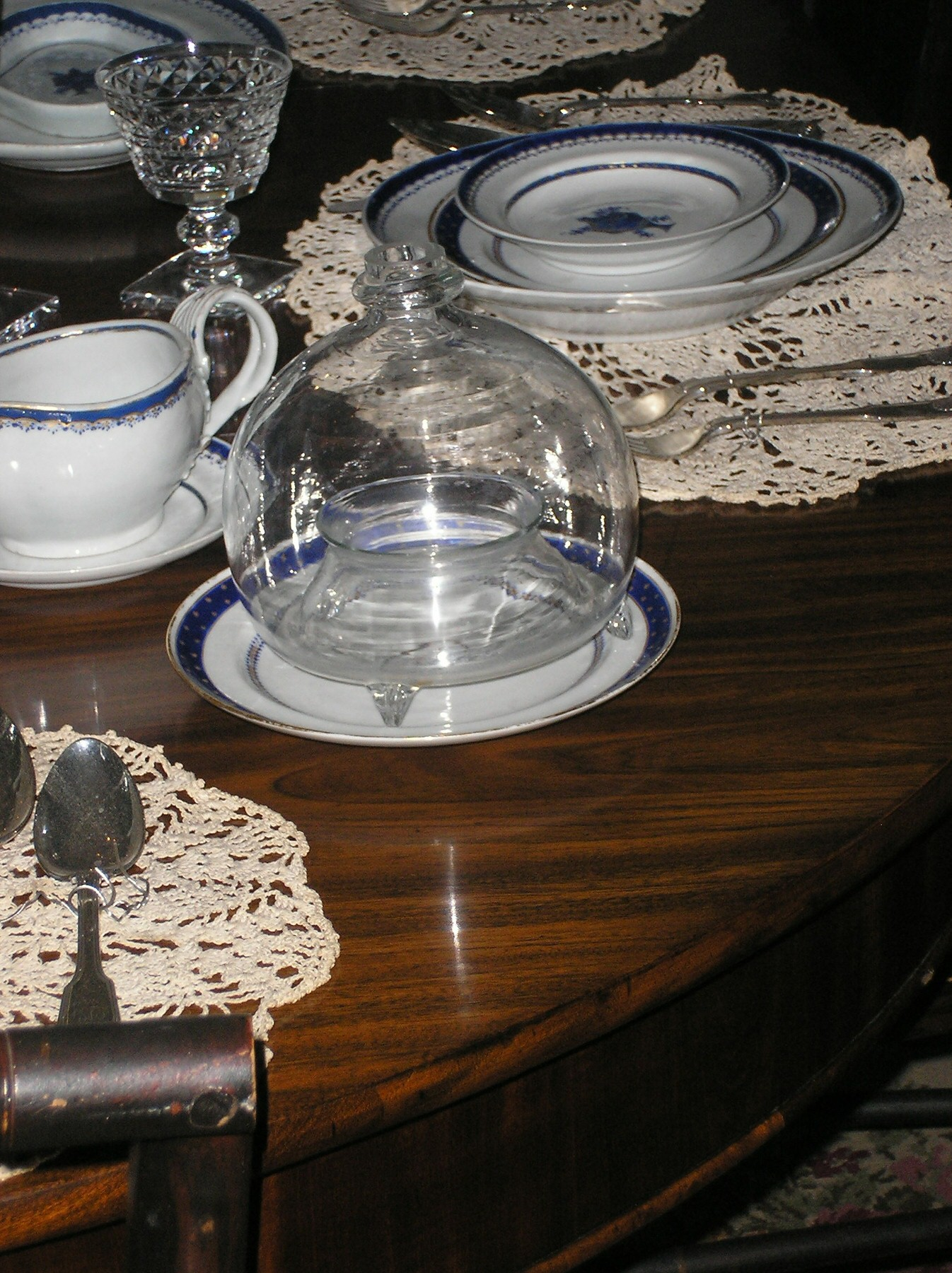
A fly trap

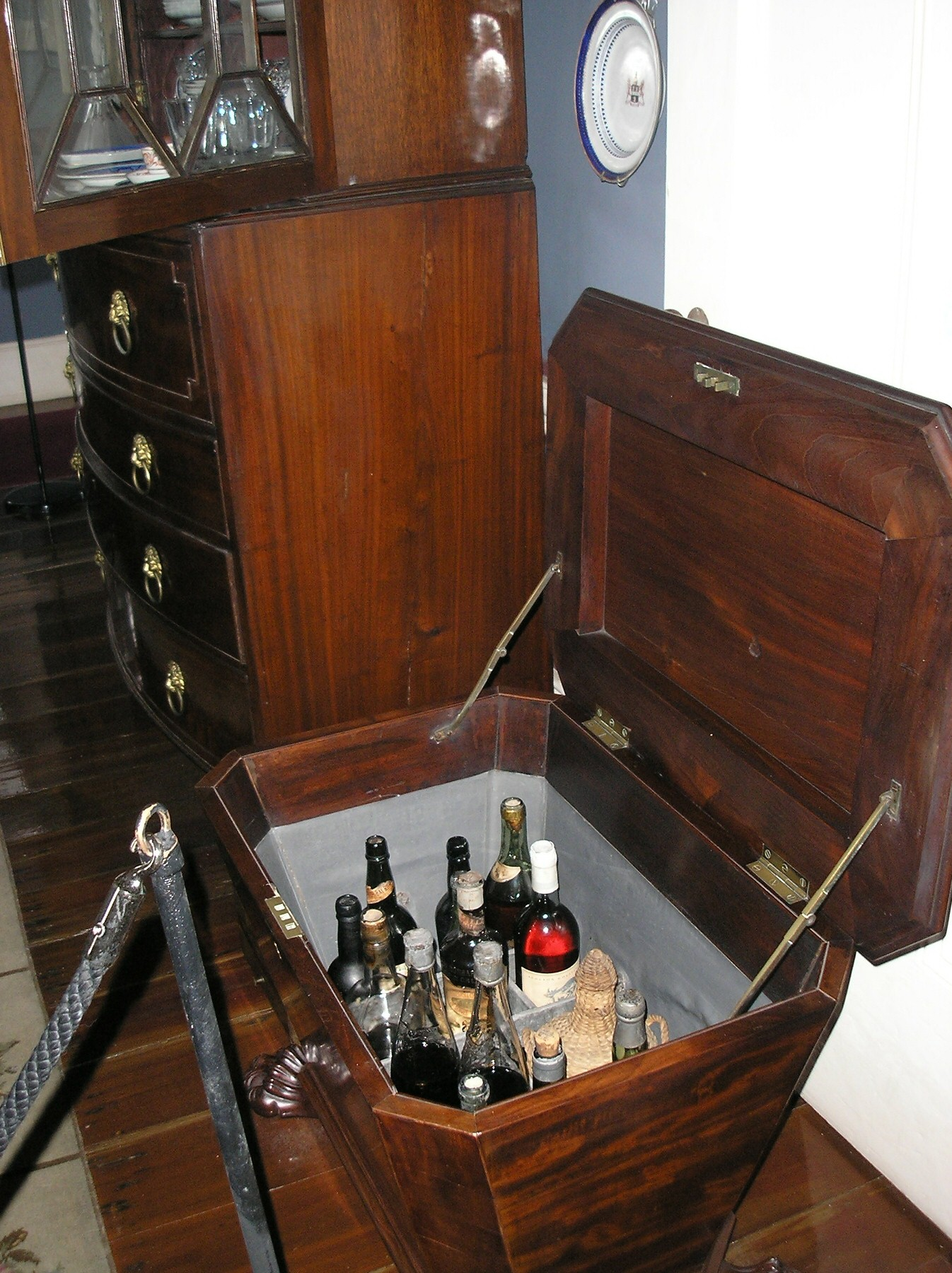
A wine cooler

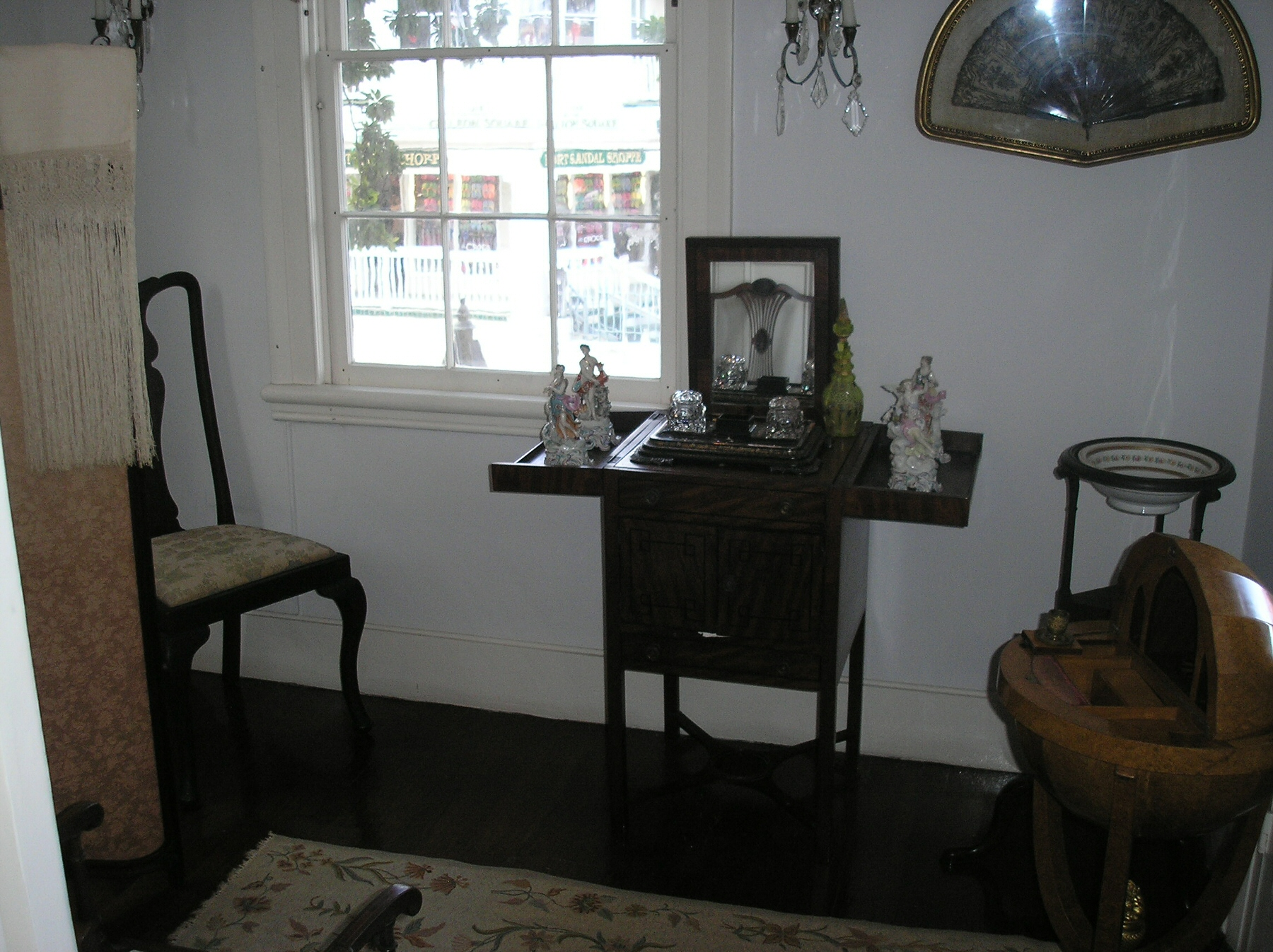

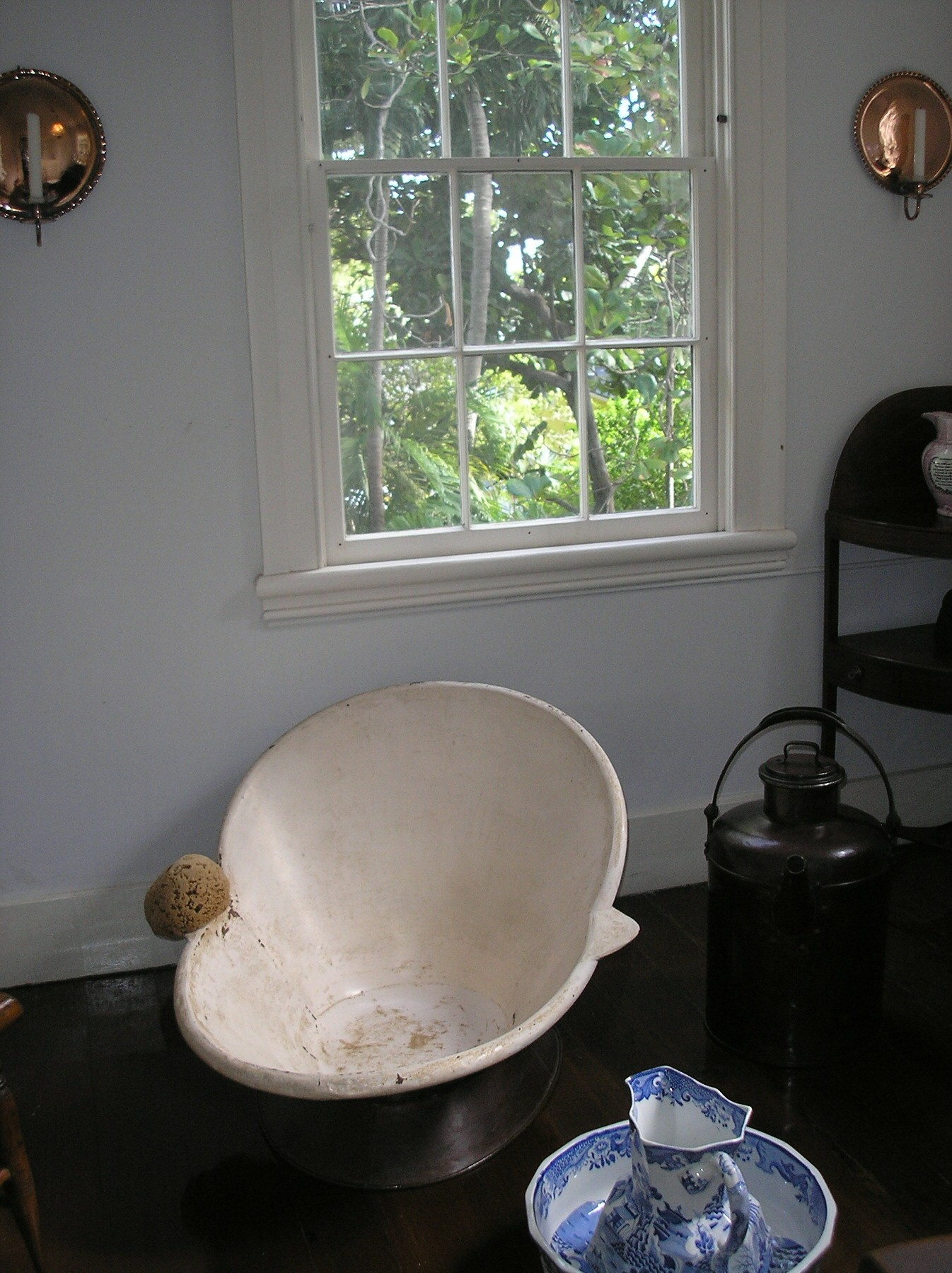

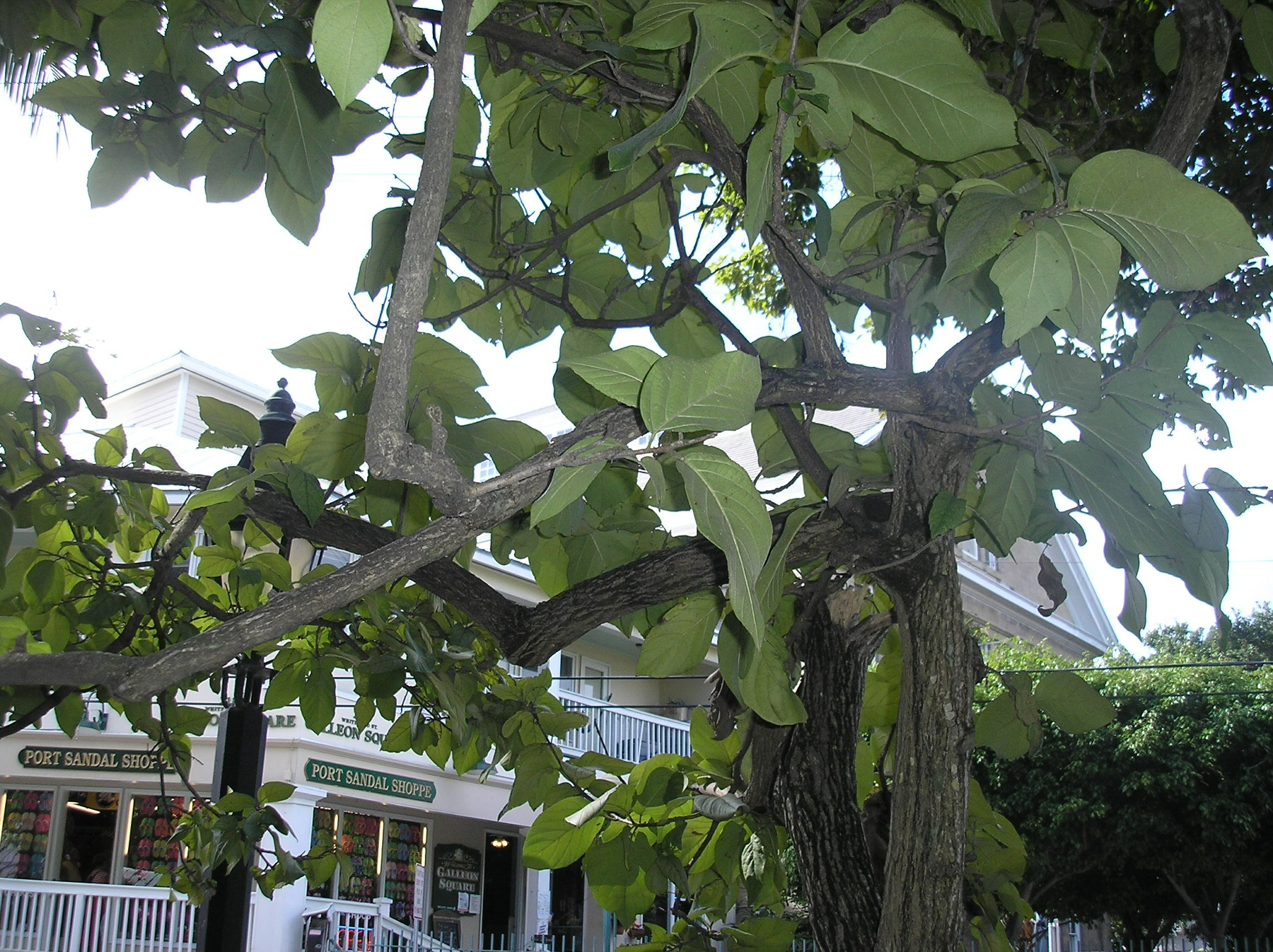
A Geiger tree
