= Golisano Children's Museum of Naples =

Coordinates: 26.26598°N 81.75207°W

The Golisano Children's Museum of Naples (CMON) is a children's museum in Naples, Florida, United States.

CMON was founded in 2002 and is a 501(c)(3) not-for-profit charitable organization and a member of the Association of Children's Museums. The building is two stories and 30,000 square feet.

CMON "invites visitors of all ages to journey through the swamps of the Everglades, weave through a maze, climb a two-story banyan tree, or experiment with the water play station."

== WGCU Presents ==
Every month the museum presents a show from PBS for an event.
