= Andrée Ruellan =

American painter

- Andrée Ruellan
- Born: Andrée Ruellan; April 6, 1905; New York, New York
- Died: July 15, 2006 (aged 101); Kingston, New York
- Resting place: Kingston, New York
- Education: Largely self-taught, sometime student at the Art Students League of New York
- Known for: Modern art
- Spouse: John W. ("Jack") Taylor

Andrée Ruellan (April 6, 1905 – July 15, 2006) was an American artist whose realist work has modernist overtones and commonly depicts everyday scenes in American South and New York City. Born in Manhattan of French descent, she spent her youth there and in Paris and eventually made her home near the artist colony in Woodstock, New York. Her paintings, prints, watercolors, and drawings are known for their depiction of ordinary people at work and play. They are held by many American museums and private collectors.

== Early life and education ==
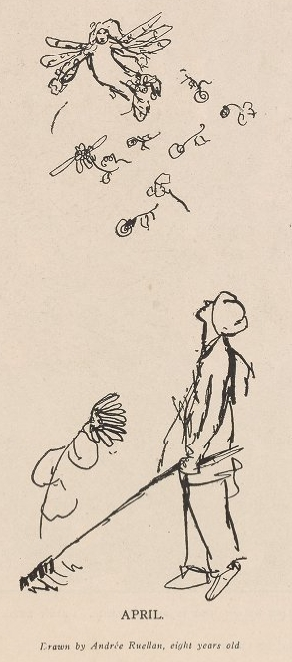
Drawing entitled April by Andrée Ruellan, age 8, appearing in The Masses, v. 5, n. 7, April 1914

Ruellan was born in a brownstone near Washington Square Park in 1905 and was the only child of a couple who had immigrated from France a few years earlier. Her parents encouraged an early talent she showed for making realistic and fanciful drawings. Ardent socialists, they believed the visual arts could help redress the dismissive attitude with which many Americans viewed people who were both less advantaged than themselves and, as they saw it, unpleasantly alien. When she was about eight, they arranged for an amateur artist, Ben Liber, to give her informal instruction and a year later her first published work appeared in the April issue of a socialist monthly, The Masses along with an editorial on religious hypocrisy by Max Eastman. Her drawing, called April, showed an angel scattering flowers above the head of a workman. That same year Ruellan's artwork came to the attention of the Ashcan School painter Robert Henri. He arranged to include some of her watercolors and drawings in a show at St. Mark's Church in-the-Bowery where he and George Bellows also showed.

Over the next few years, Ruellan suffered setbacks, first when she was injured in a fire and later when her father died in an accident at work and, while still in her teens, she began selling paintings, watercolors, and drawings to help support herself and her mother. In 1920 she won a scholarship to study at the Art Students League with the painter, Maurice Sterne, and sculptor, Leo Lentelli. Two years later she followed Sterne to Rome on another art scholarship, and over the next five years she and her mother remained in Paris where she continued to work and study. During that time she obtained her first solo exhibition at the Sacre du Printemps Gallerie, and in 1928 she was given her second one-woman show at the Weyhe Gallery in New York. While in Paris, she met and fell in love with the American artist John Taylor. With Ruellan's mother, the pair returned to the United States in 1929 and settled in Shady, a village near Woodstock, New York.

== Mature style ==
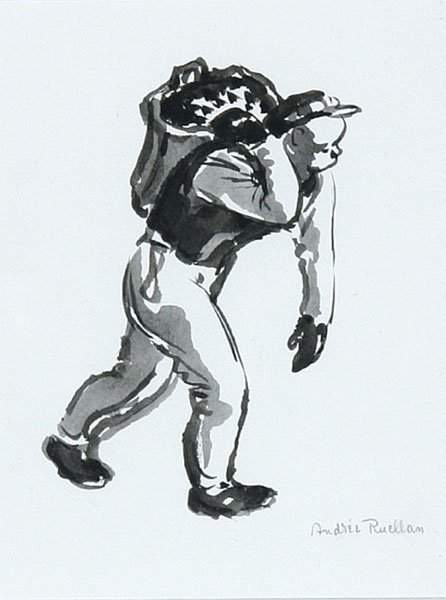
Andrée Ruellan, Coal Delivery, an undated drawing, ink and wash on paper, 6 3/4 by 5 inches (170 mm × 130 mm)

In the 1930s, Ruellan developed a style that was social-realist with modernist and abstract elements. Her sympathy for her subjects and her ability to convey a warmth in them is similar to Edward Hopper's or Howard Cook's. See, for example, her undated drawing, Coal Delivery, which appears to come from this period. Drawn with ink and wash on paper, it shows an African-American man carrying a heavy bag of coal on his back. He is leaning forward as he places his right foot down and begins to raise the left one. He holds the coal bag with his right hand and leaves his left arm hanging free. The sketch suggests a patient endurance. The composition gives contrasts of diagonal—from left foot to cap—and vertical—the right leg and left arm, the whole showing both the pull of gravity and the energy of forward motion. In work such as this, Ruellan was seen to present social criticism with artistic frankness and little covering up of social facts, but also with empathy and awareness of the value of each person as a specific individual and not simply a generic "type".

One of her best-known works, Crap Game of 1936, is more stylized than other compositions of the same period. As the title suggests, it shows a group of men playing craps. The industrial structures in the background provide what amounts to a stage on which the actions of the game take place. Ruellan normally worked surreptitiously, hiding her sketchbook in a newspaper, or sketching from the window of a car with the sketchbook in her lap. In doing this, she insured a high degree of spontaneity in her work, but on this occasion the formality of the composition tempers the immediacy that her work usually shows. She made the sketch while on a trip to Charleston, South Carolina, a place that, she said, was like a "whole new world" compared to New York and Paris where she had spent her youth.

She had been able to spend a month in Charleston because, despite the stock market crash and subsequent depression, Ruellan and Taylor were able to support themselves through art. The Weyhe Gallery in New York had given Ruellan a means of selling her work and Taylor took temporary jobs as art teacher at several universities. By the mid-1930s, they had enough money to permit some travel and selected Charleston as their destination in hope that it would produce the sort of down-to-earth subjects that they sought. The choice proved to be a good one as one of the paintings which resulted from that visit—Market Place—was the first of hers to be collected by a major museum. The Metropolitan Museum purchased it in 1940.

During these years, Ruellan said her practice was to prepare a sketch in the field, develop the sketch into an intermediate form, usually gouache on paper, then create the finished product in oil on canvas. She worked on more than one painting at a time, moving on when she felt she was losing a sense of freshness in her work. When working in oils she thought out composition, balance, movement, and the tension of colors and patterns while retaining as much as possible the informality that was present in the original drawing.

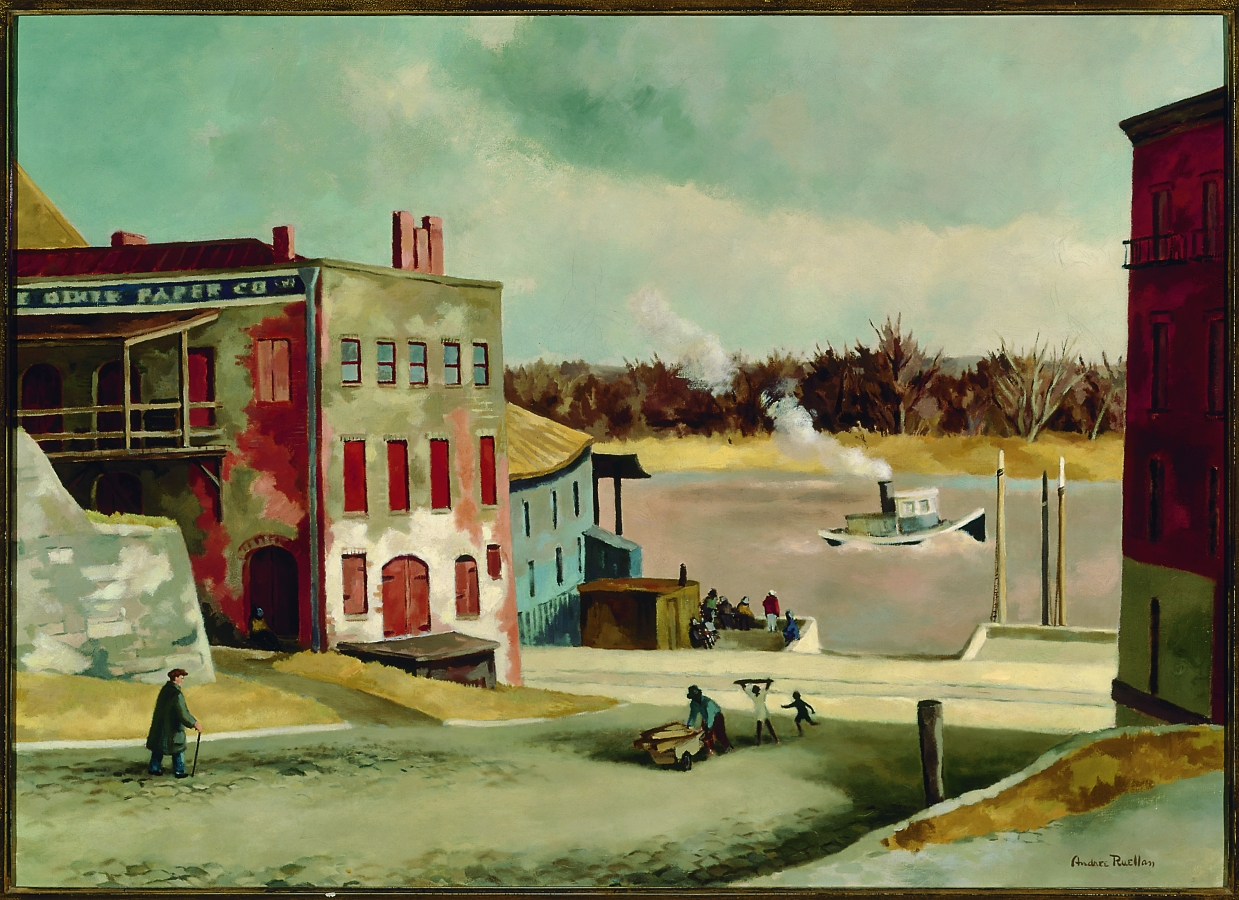
Andrée Ruellan, Savannah, c. 1942, oil on canvas, 26 by 36 1/2 inches (660 mm × 930 mm), Telfair Museum of Art, Savannah, Georgia, Museum purchase, 1998.8 © Daniel B. Gelfand

In 1941, Ruellan traveled to Savannah with her husband and her mother in order to spend several weeks observing and sketching. The painting she called Savannah dates from this period. Although Savannah is a city, there is no urban bustle and the painting has an almost pastoral appeal. The few figures shown are unhurried. The viewer sees what is clearly a real place at a specific moment of time, but is also aware of an emotionally evocative content: warehouses that are shut up, a man slumped in a doorway. Those who are not burdened by the necessity of manual labor (children, a white man with a cane, loiterers on the dock) contrast with one who is, an African-American pushing a handcart of lumber up the ramp.

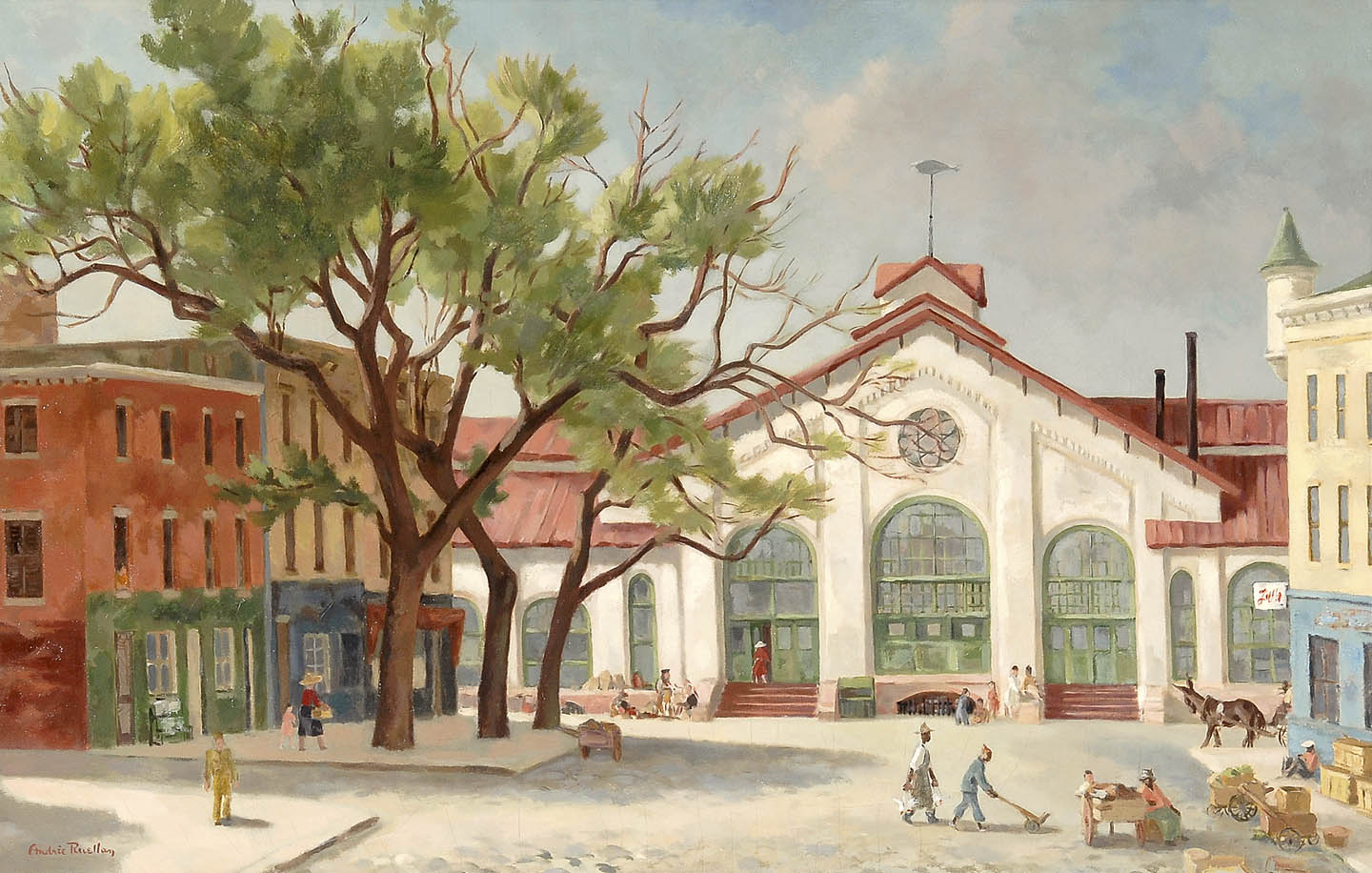
Savannah Landscape, The City Market by Andrée Ruellan, oil on canvas, 26 1/4 by 40 1/4 inches (670 mm × 1,020 mm), circa 1943

A second painting from the trip to Savannah, Savannah Landscape, The City Market, is similar to the harbor view. The light is warm and bright and the colors are warm and muted. The tone is placid and there's a suggestion of timeless continuity, yet the scene is clearly a specific moment in time. Once again, there is a distinction between those who perform manual labor, shown at right, and those who do not, including a man in military uniform.

A third painting from the trip to Savannah, The Wind-Up, was shown at the Whitney Museum in 1941 and purchased by the Phillips Collection later that year. Showing a sandlot ball game near a gas storage tank and some low-income housing, it depicts players and spectators enjoying weekend downtime. The painting fulfills Ruellan's intention to make works that are both well executed in a technical sense and also have emotional content. In an interview conducted in 1943, she said, "People are never just spots of color. What moves me most is that in spite of poverty and the constant struggle for existence, so much kindness and sturdy courage remain. Naturally I want to paint well-designed pictures—but I also wish to convey these warmer human emotions."

In 1941–42, Ruellan made two murals for the Section of Painting and Sculpture of the U.S. Treasury Department, one entitled A Country Saw Mill for the post office in Emporia, Virginia, and the other, called Spring in Georgia, for the post office in Lawrenceville, Georgia. Created during the early stages of the U.S. participation in World War II, they conformed, broadly, to the we-can-do-it attitude fostered by the government and widely accepted within the country. A Country Saw Mill shows a small steam-driven mill. At right, a worker moves logs into position for sawing while a man with a notebook supervises. At center, men can be seen observing the sawing within the mill and finished lumber is stacked. At far left a man drives a team of horses pulling more logs from the forest that can be seen in the distance. The seven workers in view are African-American while the two supervisors are white. Ruellan prepared sketches on-site, as was her usual practice, and painted the mural in her studio retaining much of the freshness of the scene she had drawn.

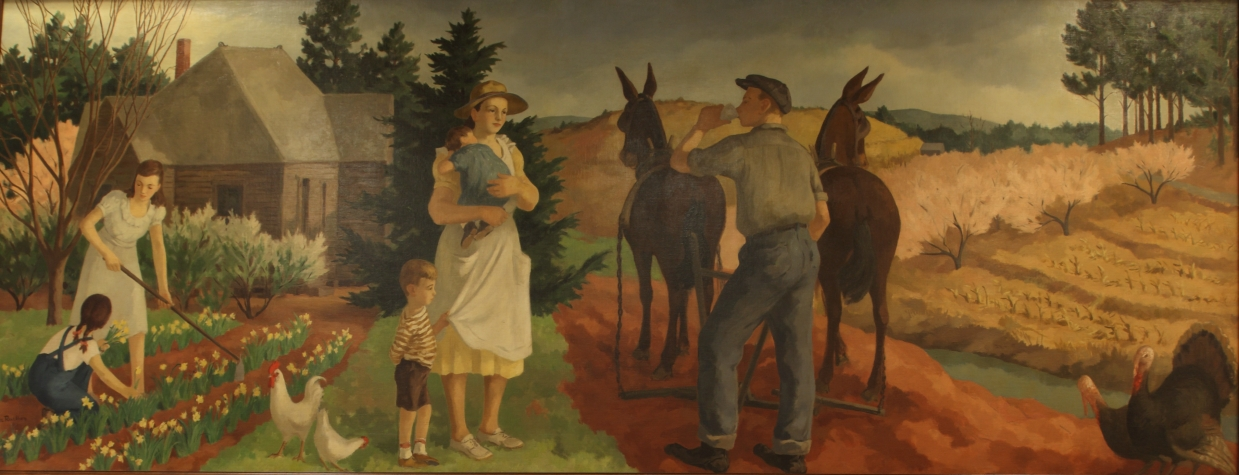
Andrée Ruellan, Spring In Georgia

Spring in Georgia shows ordinary people in a rural setting: a woman and a girl tilling a flower garden, a mother with a young boy and infant, and a man with a team of mules. The painting conveys a sense of purpose and resourcefulness. It has four roughly equal segments. At left is the flower garden with cozy homestead in the background. Next appears the woman standing with her two children on a strip of grass before a large conifer. The man with his mules, standing on turned earth, drinks a glass of milk or water. At right is a hillside orchard and a stand of trees with two turkeys in the foreground. Ruellan made sketches for the painting in Lawrenceville but it is clear that she did not make the painting from a single drawing but rather constructed it, frieze-like, out of a number of scenes she viewed. The composite nature of the composition draws attention to the painting's symbolic import. Of this symbolism, one critic said "the whole has the patchwork quality of abiding memories and not the spontaneity and vitality of an actual scene."

Ruellan was represented by Maynard Walker Galleries, New York, from 1936 until 1941 when she switched to the Kraushaar Galleries where she continued for the rest of her life. Her reason for leaving the Walker Galleries had to do with an unwanted association. That gallery was known for showing the work of the leading American Scene painters Although there were similarities in subject matter, Ruellan did not see herself as a genre painter of this type. She insisted that her subjects be actual people not just representatives of a class of people, a race, or residents of a geographic region. She was also more modernist in her approach and her work showed influences of the French avant-garde not present in theirs.

Ruellan signed with the American Artists Group soon after the company's founding in 1936. She contributed works to their catalog in the category called "fine art reproductions of museum artists." Both in Paris and New York she made a habit of making circus sketches that she later developed into paintings, gouache, and prints to which American Artists Group purchased reproduction rights. A well-known example of this work is a gouache called Pop! Goes the Weasel. She also made seasonal images for cards and colored advertisements. One of the latter promoted the drinking of beer during the traditional Thanksgiving meal. Called Thanksgiving Dinner, it appeared in 1945 accompanied by text naming it "one of a series of typical American scenes painted by America's foremost artists."

== Later life and work ==
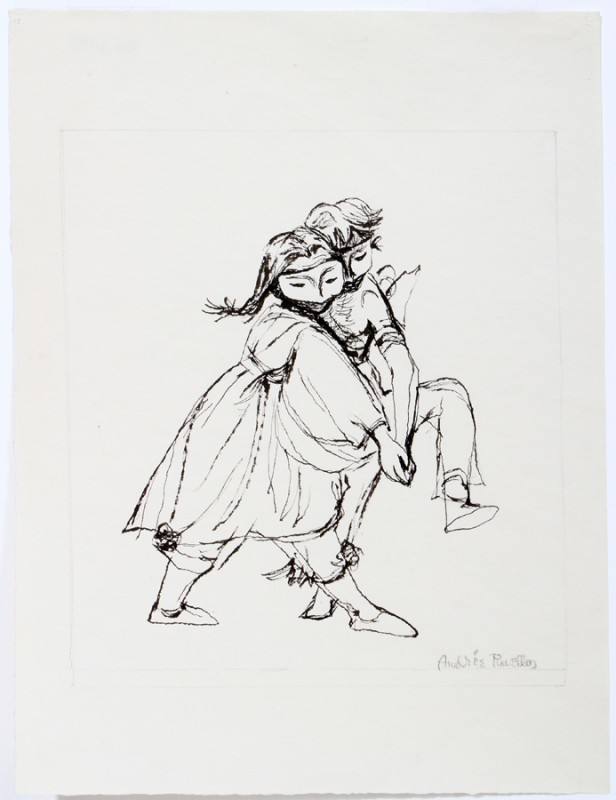
Andrée Ruellan, Masques, sugar lift aquatint, 1951, 7 by 6 1/8 inches (180 mm × 160 mm)

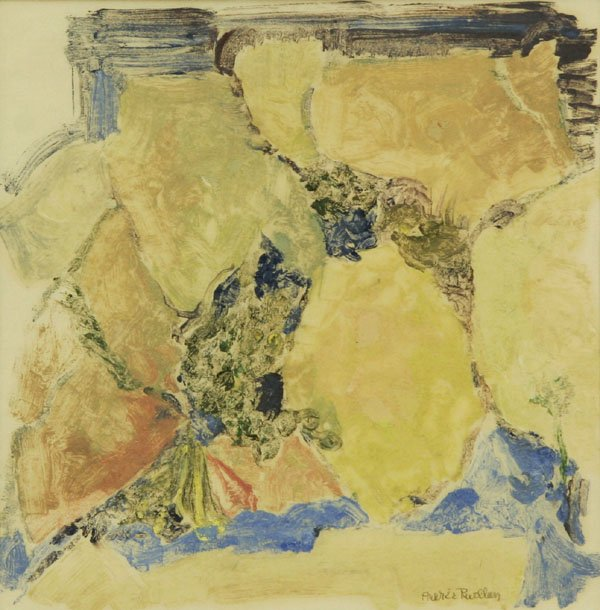
Untitled painting ("boulders") by Andrée Ruellan, colored monotype, 10 by 10 inches (250 mm × 250 mm)

During World War II and the post-war years, Ruellan's style evolved to become darker and her work began to convey greater tension than before and to show surrealistic tendencies. She appears to have been disillusioned by the devastation suffered by Europeans during and after the war, by the discrimination suffered by her close friend, the Japanese-American artist Yasuo Kuniyoshi, and by her reaction to the extravagant Mardi Gras celebrations that she experienced in New Orleans for the first time in 1948.

Ruellan's paintings from this period often contain children in Mardi Gras costumes and masks. They might seem to be playful, but there are disturbing elements in their too-adult attitudes and the segregation of onlookers. Children's Mardi Gras of 1949 is one of her best-known works of this period. It shows four children wearing carnival masks and costumes. Their pose suggests an attempt to mimic decadent adult behavior that is associated with Mardi Gras. Behind them, four uncostumed children peer through a grating on the top of a wall and another is seen through a metal-wire barrier. Of the four costumed children, one pair are dancing together. The two appear again in Ruellan's Masques of 1951, a sugar lift aquatint print. The composition of the print resembles that of her drawing, Coal Delivery. In both works the figures are moving from left to right, glancing downward and in both one sees the same diagonal and vertical lines of force. However, in tone the two works are distinctly different from one another. In Coal Delivery the viewer is led to share the artist's empathy with her subject while in Masques the viewer senses the discordance of the scene. In the latter, there is no youthful exuberance, nothing like the quiet resilience and sturdy courage conveyed by the former.

In the mid-1950s, Ruellan's work began to brighten again. She did not return to the social realism of the 1930s, but, following a trip to France, her art became increasingly abstract. At about that time she began to do sumi ink wash painting which proved to be a useful tool in merging representational fragments into an overall abstract approach. Seed Dates of 1960, 15 by 24 inches (380 mm × 610 mm), is an example of her sumi work. It shows a stalk of dates lying on an undifferentiated flat surface. Her most abstract work came after a stay in Florida during the early 1960s. An untitled colored monotype from that period, which is informally called "Boulders", while clearly revealing its subject, nonetheless shows sympathy the art of the Abstract Expressionists and is both brighter and freer than her work in the post-war period. In these paintings the panels of color are elements of design as much as objects in nature.

== Personal information ==
Ruellan's father, André (also known as Andrew), worked in the aviation industry as a pilot and mechanic. He had hoped to become a sculptor, but found he could not support his family by that means. Her mother was Lucette Lambert (also called Louise). Both parents were born and raised in France. In about 1900, their socialist politics and pacifist beliefs led them to migrate to New York so that André would not be drafted into the French army. Ruellan was born in a brownstone building in New York's Greenwich Village on April 6, 1905. She was an only child. French was the language spoken at home and thus was her first language. In 1952, Ruellan was described as a petite brunette.

When Ruellan was about 12 she was injured in a fire and shortly thereafter the family moved from Manhattan to Mineola, Long Island. A few years later, in 1920, André died in an airfield accident. Ruellan and her mother returned to Manhattan and Ruellan obtained scholarship aid to develop her skills so as to help support herself and her mother. Following the death of her father, she and her mother remained together for the rest of their lives. During the 1920s, they resided together in Paris. In 1929, Ruellan met, and three months later, married John W. Taylor. Returning to the United States, the three lived together in a farmhouse Taylor had purchased in Shady, New York. They resided there until their deaths. Ruellan and Taylor had determined to support themselves via their art and Lucette agreed to take on the management of their household so as to give them more time for their work. She also accompanied them on their travels. John Taylor was also known as Jack Taylor, John Williams Taylor, and John W. Taylor. He was born in Baltimore, Maryland, in 1897, and died in Shady, New York, in 1983. Ruellan provided income through sale of artworks and Taylor did the same while also taking temporary jobs teaching college-level art courses. Ruellan and Taylor were active participants within the artists' colony at Woodstock and she continued to produce art well into her eighties.

=== Longevity ===
At 95 years old Andree was quoted as saying, "If you have talent, don't neglect it. One of my great life joys was marrying an artist who was my equal. It made my life so much richer than those of most of my friends." She died July 15, 2006, at the age of 101 at an extended care facility in Kingston, New York.

== Collections ==
Ruellan's work has been widely collected in American museums. This is a selected list.

- Columbus Museum, Columbus, Georgia
- Fogg Art Museum, Harvard University
- Johnson Collection, Spartanburg, South Carolina
- Metropolitan Museum of Art, New York
- Michele & Donald D'Amour Museum of Fine Arts, Springfield, Massachusetts
- Michelson Museum of Art, Marshall, Texas
- Morris Museum of Art, Augusta, Georgia
- William Rockhill Nelson Gallery, Kansas City,
- Philadelphia Museum of Art
- Phillips Collection, Washington, D.C.
- San Diego Museum of Art, San Diego, California
- Springville Museum of Art, Springville, Utah
- Telfair Museum of Art, Savannah, Georgia
- University of Michigan Museum of Art, Ann Arbor, Michigan
- Whitney Museum of American Art, New York

== Exhibitions ==
This is a selected list. Unless otherwise noted, the source is the "Calendar of Art Exhibitions" section of in various issues of Parnassus magazine.

- 1914 St. Mark's Church in the Bowery, New York
- 1914 MacDowell Club, New York
- 1925 Austin Dunham's Sea Chest
- 1925 Galeria Sacre du Printemps, Paris
- 1928 Weyhe Gallery, New York
- 1931 Weyhe Galleries, New York
- 1934 Self Portraits by Living American Artists, Whitney Museum, New York
- 1936 39th Annual Exhibition: American Painting, City Art Museum of St. Louis
- 1937 Solo Exhibition, Walker Galleries, New York
- 1940 Annual Exhibition, Associated American Artists Galleries, New York
- 1944 The Art Institute of Chicago * The Fifty-fifth Annual American Exhibition: Water Colors and Drawings
- 1952 Solo Exhibition, Kraushaar Galleries, New York
- 1952 A Decade of American Printmaking, Philadelphia Museum of Art
- 1965 Lehigh University, Bethlehem, Pennsylvania
- 1965 Storm King Art Center, Mountainville, New York
- 1973 Fourteen Women Printmakers of the 30s and 40s, Mount Holyoke, Massachusetts
- 2005 Georgia Museum of Art, Telfair Museum of Art (Savannah), and the Columbus Museum of Art (Ohio), retrospective in honor of Ruellan's 100th birthday. The exhibition was accompanied by an essay of appreciation by Andrew Ladis and a documentary film.

== Awards and honors ==
- 1945 American Academy of Arts Letters
- 1950 Guggenheim Fellowship
- 1981 Sally Jacobs-Phoebe Towbin Award, Woodstock, New York
- 1994 Yasuo Kuniyoshi Award, Woodstock, New York

== Galleries ==
- 1936-1941 Walker Galleries, New York
- 1941-2006 Kraushaar Galleries, New York
