= List of Guggenheim Fellowships awarded in 1947 =

One hundred twenty-two Guggenheim Fellowships were awarded in 1947. A total of $310,000 was disbursed. The University of California received the highest number of fellowships given to a single institution.

== 1947 U.S. and Canadian Fellows ==
Category	Field of Study	Fellow	Institution	Research topic	Notes	Ref
Creative Arts	Choreography	Charles Edward Weidman		Choreographic pieces dealing with human values, particularly small group choreography on James Thurber's Fables for Our Time		
Creative Arts	Fiction	Ralph Bates		Writing		
Creative Arts	Fiction	Eleanor Clark		Rome and a Villa (published 1952)	Also won in 1950	
Creative Arts	Fiction	J. R. Humphreys	Columbia University	Writing		
Creative Arts	Fiction	Roger Lemelin		Writing	Also won in 1946	
Creative Arts	Fiction	Isaac Rosenfeld		Writing		
Creative Arts	Fiction	Robert Penn Warren	University of Minnesota	Writing	Also won in 1939	
Creative Arts	Film	John Hales Whitney		Experimental work in abstract sound film	Also won in 1948	
Creative Arts	Fine Arts	Frank Davenport Duncan			Also won in 1945	
Creative Arts	Fine Arts	Xavier Gonzalez		Painting		
Creative Arts	Fine Arts	Philip Guston	Washington University in St. Louis	Painting	Also won in 1968	
Creative Arts	Fine Arts	Donal Hord		Sculpture	Also won in 1945	
Creative Arts	Fine Arts	Jack Nichols		Painting		
Creative Arts	Fine Arts	Alexander Peter Russo	Bard College	Painting	Also won in 1949	
Creative Arts	Fine Arts	Mitchell Siporin		Painting	Also won in 1945	
Creative Arts	Fine Arts	Rudolph Charles von Ripper		Etching and drawing	Also won in 1945	
Creative Arts	Music Composition	Samuel Barber		Composing	Also won in 1945, 1949	
Creative Arts	Music Composition	Edward T. Cone		Composing		
Creative Arts	Music Composition	Ross Lee Finney	Smith College	Composing	Also won in 1937	
Creative Arts	Music Composition	Gian Carlo Menotti		Composing	Also won in 1946	
Creative Arts	Music Composition	Jerome Moross		Composing	Also won in 1949	
Creative Arts	Music Composition	Alex North		Composing		
Creative Arts	Music Composition	Harold Samuel Shapero		Composing	Also won in 1946	
Creative Arts	Music Composition	Louise Juliette Talma		Composing	Also won in 1946	
Creative Arts	Photography	Wayne Forest Miller		Black Chicagoans	Also won in 1946	
Creative Arts	Poetry	Elizabeth Bishop		Writing	Also won in 1978	
Creative Arts	Poetry	Gwendolyn Brooks		Writing	Also won in 1946	
Creative Arts	Poetry	Robert Lowell		Writing		
Creative Arts	Poetry	Edward Ronald Weismiller		Writing	Also won in 1943	
Humanities	American Literature	Daniel Aaron	Smith College	American progressive tradition as seen in the writings of Parker, George, Bellamy, Lloyd, Rauschenbusch, Howells and Veblen		
Humanities	American Literature	John Wendell Dodds	Stanford University	The Age of Paradox: A Biography of England 1841-1851 (published 1952)		
Humanities	American Literature	Alfred Kazin			Also won in 1940, 1958, 1969	
Humanities	American Literature	Arlin Turner	Duke University		Also won in 1959	
Humanities	Architecture, Planning and Design	Carl Kenneth Hersey	University of Rochester			
Humanities	Architecture, Planning and Design	Carroll Louis Meeks	Yale University	Historical development of railroad stations as examples of architectural solutions to meet new needs		
Humanities	Biography	Shirley Graham		Anne Newport Royall and her contribution to the American mind		
Humanities	Biography	Jeannette Mirsky		Eli Whitney and the impact of his inventive and business ability in the history of the United States	Also won in 1949	
Humanities	British History	William Haller	Barnard College	Thought and expression in the Puritan Revolution	Also won in 1950, 1956	
Humanities	British History	Jack H. Hexter	Queens College, CUNY	Change in the structure of 16th-century European society	Also won in 1942, 1979	
Humanities	British History	Arthur J. Marder			Also won in 1941, 1946	
Humanities	British History	Charles Loch Mowat	University of California, Los Angeles	History of Great Britain from Armistice Day to the evacuation of Dunkirk		
Humanities	Classics	Malcolm Francis McGregor	University of Cincinnati	History of the ancient Athenian Empire		
Humanities	Classics	Friedrich Solmsen	Cornell University			
Humanities	English Literature	David V. Erdman	Wayne State University	Social change in England, 1789-1806, as it influenced and was influenced by the writers of the time		
Humanities	English Literature	G. Blakemore Evans	University of Wisconsin	Manuscript of miscellanies or commonplace books of English verse from 1550 to 1700 contained in the principal libraries and private collections in the United States		
Humanities	English Literature	Edward Lippincott McAdam, Jr	New York University	Dr. Johnson and the English Law (published 1951)		
Humanities	English Literature	William Andrew Ringler, Jr	Princeton University		Also won in 1957	
Humanities	English Literature	Hallett D. Smith	Williams College			
Humanities	Fine Arts Research	Sumner McKnight Crosby	Yale University	Excavations in the Basilica of Saint-Denis to gather evidence for a book on the Abbey of Saint-Denis		
Humanities	Fine Arts Research	Alfred Victor Frankenstein	San Francisco Chronicle	William Michael Harnett		
Humanities	Fine Arts Research	Paul Frankl	Institute for Advanced Study	History of Gothic architecture		
Humanities	Fine Arts Research	José López-Rey	Smith College	Drawings of Francisco de Goya	Also won in 1960, 1967	
Humanities	Fine Arts Research	Theodore Sizer	Yale University	Biography of John Trumbull		
Humanities	Folklore and Popular Culture	Elaine O'Beirne-Ranelagh		Completion of two books: one on New York City folk songs, and one on Irish folk songs		
Humanities	French History	Paul Harold Beik	Swarthmore College	Conflicting social philosophies in the French Revolution	Also won in 1949	
Humanities	French Literature	Wallace Fowlie	University of Chicago	Critical and interpretive study of Stéphane Mallarmé's poetry	Also won in 1961	
Humanities	French Literature	Jeanne Varney Pleasants	Columbia University	French speech, its intonations and rhythm		
Humanities	General Nonfiction	Joseph Kinsey Howard		Métis Nation of northwestern United States and western Canada	Also won in 1948	
Humanities	General Nonfiction	Laurence Stapleton	Bryn Mawr College	The general ideas on which democracy depends and the setting and atmosphere of democracy today as they appear to the private citizen		
Humanities	German and Scandinavian Literature	Richard Alewyn	Queens College, CUNY			
Humanities	History of Science and Technology	James R. Newman			Also won in 1946	
Humanities	Latin American Literature	José Juan Arrom	Yale University	Spanish American drama and its relation to other literature	Also won in 1964	
Humanities	Latin American Literature	Robert Hayward Barlow	National School of Anthropology and History	History of the empire of Montezuma	Also won in 1946	
Humanities	Linguistics	Wolf Leslau	École libre des hautes études	Language, traditional history, and folklore of Ethiopia	Also won in 1946	
Humanities	Literary Criticism	Richard Volney Chase	Connecticut College	Herman Melville's thought and the allegory and symbols he used to express his thought	Also won in 1962	
Humanities	Literary Criticism	Lionel Trilling	Columbia University	Critical essays on English and American subjects	Also won in 1975	
Humanities	Medieval Literature	Alexander J. Denomy	University of Toronto	Mystical philosophy of Avicenna and its place in the medieval Christian world		
Humanities	Medieval Literature	Francis Lee Utley	Ohio State University	Apocryphal stories of the flood	Also won in 1946, 1952	
Humanities	Music Research	Helen Margaret Hewitt	North Texas State College	Secular choral music of Italy in the late 15th century		
Humanities	Music Research	Dragan Plamenac				
Humanities	Music Research	Walter H. Rubsamen	University of California, Los Angeles	Historical and stylistic study of music of 18th-century ballad operas in England and the United States	Also won in 1957	
Humanities	Philosophy	Herbert Feigl	University of Minnesota	Philosophical and methodological problems of psychology		
Humanities	Philosophy	Carl Gustav Hempel	Queens College, CUNY			
Humanities	Philosophy	Paul Henle	Northwestern University			
Humanities	Philosophy	Richard Otto Hertz	University of Dubuque	Theory of value based on aesthetics		
Humanities	Philosophy	Henry M. Rosenthal	Cooper Union			
Humanities	Photography Studies	Beaumont Newhall	Museum of Modern Art	The History of Photography, 1839 to the Present (published 1948)	Also won in 1975	
Humanities	United States History	Edwin Morris Betts	University of Virginia	Edition of Thomas Jefferson's Farm Book		
Humanities	United States History	Dorothy Burne Goebel	Hunter College, CUNY	British Free Ports policy and the American West Indian Interest, 1765-1815		
Humanities	United States History	Richard B. Morris	City College of New York	Economic and legal status of free indentured, and slave labor in the United States before the American Civil War	Also won in 1961, 1982	
Natural Sciences	Applied Science	George L. Kreezer			Also won in 1945	
Natural Sciences	Chemistry	Thomas L. Jacobs	University of California, Los Angeles	Polymerization of acetylenes		
Natural Sciences	Chemistry	Milton Orchin		Research at the Sieff Institute		
Natural Sciences	Chemistry	Verner Schomaker	California Institute of Technology	Molecular structure		
Natural Sciences	Chemistry	David P. Shoemaker	California Institute of Technology	Electronic structure of metals		
Natural Sciences	Chemistry	James Curren Warf	Iowa State College	Physico-inorganic chemistry of certain metallic hydrides		
Natural Sciences	Earth Science	Henry Paul Hansen	Oregon State College	Paleobotanical study of post-glacial forest migrations and climate in western Canada, based on analyses of fossil pollen gathered in peat bogs in the area	Also won in 1943	
Natural Sciences	Earth Science	John Sinclair Stevenson	British Columbia Department of Mines	Ores and rocks in British Columbia Coast mountain ranges		
Natural Sciences	Mathematics	Warren Ambrose	Yale University	Algebras of locally-compact topological groups		
Natural Sciences	Mathematics	Garrett Birkhoff	Harvard University	Hydrodynamics		
Natural Sciences	Mathematics	Paul Halmos	University of Chicago	Research at the Institute for Advanced Studies		
Natural Sciences	Mathematics	Saunders Mac Lane	Harvard University	Borderline between algebra and algebraic tophography	Also won in 1982	
Natural Sciences	Mathematics	Walter H. Pitts	Massachusetts Institute of Technology	Cybernetics	Also won in 1945	
Natural Sciences	Molecular and Cellular Biology	Britton Chance	University of Pennsylvania	Research with Hugo Theorell in Stockholm	Also won in 1945	
Natural Sciences	Molecular and Cellular Biology	Gordon Mackinney	University of California, Davis			
Natural Sciences	Molecular and Cellular Biology	Berta Scharrer				
Natural Sciences	Organismic Biology and Ecology	Philip Jackson Darlington, Jr	Harvard University	Ground beetles, with an emphasis on the Carabidae family	Also won in 1956	
Natural Sciences	Organismic Biology and Ecology	Joseph Hickey	University of Michigan	Banded birds and their life expectancy in the wild, their turnover population in nature and other facts of value to conservationists	Also won in 1944	
Natural Sciences	Organismic Biology and Ecology	I. Michael Lerner	University of California, Davis		Also won in 1952, 1956	
Natural Sciences	Organismic Biology and Ecology	Pincus Philip Levine	Cornell University	Research at the Oak Ridge Institute of Nuclear Studies		
Natural Sciences	Organismic Biology and Ecology	Earle Gorton Linsley	University of California, Davis			
Natural Sciences	Organismic Biology and Ecology	James Hubert Pepper	Montana State College	Biochemical and physical study of the exoskeleton of the Mormon cricket, from the standpoint of insect control		
Natural Sciences	Organismic Biology and Ecology	Alexander Sprunt, Jr	National Audubon Society	Reference book on birds of South Carolina		
Natural Sciences	Physics	Francis Arthur Jenkins			Also won in 1932, 1958	
Natural Sciences	Plant Science	Alexander Cyril Faberge	University of Wisconsin	Conditions influencing gene mutation		
Natural Sciences	Plant Science	Gustav A. Mehlquist	Washington University in St. Louis	Problems of orchid breeding		
Natural Sciences	Plant Science	Ernest Rouleau	University of Montreal	Flora of Newfoundland		
Social Sciences	Anthropology and Cultural Studies	Sherburne Friend Cook	University of California, Berkeley		Also won in 1938	
Social Sciences	Anthropology and Cultural Studies	Anna Hadwick Gayton		Espírito Santo Festival of the California Portuguese		
Social Sciences	Anthropology and Cultural Studies	George Herzog	Columbia University	Music in primitive cultures	Also won in 1935	
Social Sciences	Anthropology and Cultural Studies	Alice Marriott		Nambé Indian Pueblo in New Mexico	Also won in 1960	
Social Sciences	Anthropology and Cultural Studies	Morris Swadesh	Linguistic Circle of New York	Language and ethnology of the "Nootka Indians" of Vancouver Island	Also won in 1946	
Social Sciences	Anthropology and Cultural Studies	Charles F. Voegelin	Indiana University	American Indian languages		
Social Sciences	Anthropology and Cultural Studies	Erminie Wheeler-Voegelin	Indiana University	"Native American and Eskimo" unwritten literature		
Social Sciences	Economics	Morris Eugene Garnsey	University of Colorado	Economy of the mountain states		
Social Sciences	Economics	Wolfgang F. Stolper	Swarthmore College			
Social Sciences	Economics	Siegfried V. Wantrup	University of California, Davis		Also won in 1951	
Social Sciences	Political Science	Robert Taylor Cole	Duke University	Effects of the wartime social, economic, and political change on the public personnel of Canada	Also won in 1942	
Social Sciences	Political Science	Sherman Kent	Yale University	Problems of national strategic intelligence operations		
Social Sciences	Psychology	Fritz Heider	Smith College		Also won in 1951	
Social Sciences	Psychology	Alexander H. Leighton	Cornell University	Comparative study of cultural and personality data dealing with "Navajo Indians, Eskimos, and Japanese"	Also won in 1945	
Social Sciences	Psychology	Dorothea Leighton	Cornell University	Comparative study of cultural and personality data dealing with "Navajo Indians, Eskimos, and Japanese"	Also won in 1945	
Social Sciences	Psychology	Bernard Frank Riess	Hunter College, CUNY			

== 1947 Latin American and Caribbean Fellows ==
Category	Field of Study	Fellow	Institution	Research topic	Notes	Ref
Creative Arts	Fine Arts	Luis Alberto Acuña				
Creative Arts	Fine Arts	Armando Pacheco				
Creative Arts	Fine Arts	Héctor Poleo		Drawing		
Humanities	Iberian and Latin American History	Eduardo Arcila Farías		Economic ideas of Spanish America during the 18th century		
Humanities	Literary Criticism	Antonio Sánchez Barbudo			Also won in 1960	
Humanities	Philosophy	Aníbal Sánchez Reulet	National University of Tucumán	Influence of philosophic ideas in Spanish America, especially during the wars of independence		
Natural Science	Chemistry	Juan Daniel Curet Cuevas	University of Puerto Rico			
Natural Science	Earth Science	Jesús Emilio Ramírez	Instituto Geofísico de los Andes Colombianos			
Natural Science	Geography and Environmental Studies	Gerardo Augusto Canet y Alvarez	Institute of La Víbora, Havana		Also won in 1945	
Natural Science	Mathematics	Luis Antonio Santaló		Research at the Institute for Advanced Studies		
Natural Science	Medicine and Health	Washington Buño			Also won in 1941	
Natural Science	Medicine and Health	José Luis Duomarco	Instituto de Medicina Experimental			
Natural Science	Medicine and Health	José Jesús Estable	Instituto de Medicina Experimental		Also won in 1945	
Natural Science	Medicine and Health	Manuel Riveros Molinari	Universidad Nacional de Asunción Medical School			
Natural Science	Medicine and Health	Thales Martins	Oswaldo Cruz Institute		Also won in 1948	
Natural Science	Molecular and Cellular Biology	Roberto F. Banfi	University of Buenos Aires			
Natural Science	Organismic Biology and Ecology	Federico Bonet Marco	Instituto Politécnico Nacional			
Natural Science	Organismic Biology and Ecology	Antenor Leitão de Carvalho			Also won in 1952	
Natural Science	Organismic Biology and Ecology	José Oiticica Filho	University of Brazil	Research at the Smithsonian Institution	Also won in 1949	
Natural Science	Plant Science	Antonio P. L. Digilio	Instituto Miguel Lillo			
Social Science	Anthropology and Cultural Studies	Juan Comas Camps	National School of Anthropology and History	Physical and social anthropology		
Social Science	Anthropology and Cultural Studies	Javier Romero Molina	National Museum of Anthropology (Mexico)	Techniques in physical anthropology		
Social Science	Economics	Jorge Kingston			Also won in 1940	

== See also ==
- Guggenheim Fellowship
- List of Guggenheim Fellowships awarded in 1946
- List of Guggenheim Fellowships awarded in 1948
