= List of Guggenheim Fellowships awarded in 1946 =

One hundred thirty-two Guggenheim Fellowships were awarded in 1946. Sixty of these were awarded as part of the post-service program, which provided fellowships to otherwise qualified artists and scholars who were taken away from their studies due to the war.

== 1946 Post-Service Fellows ==
Category	Field of Study	Fellow	Branch/service	Civilian institution	Research topic	Notes	Ref
Creative Arts	Fiction	Sam Byrd	United States Navy		Preparation of Last Train Home (unpublished)	Also won in 1948	
Creative Arts	Fiction	Everette Howard Hunt, Jr.	Office of Strategic Services		Reading, learning Spanish, and writing in Mexico		
Creative Arts	Fine Arts	Manuel Bromberg	United States Army		Painting		
Creative Arts	Fine Arts	Corrado Cagli	United States Army		Painting: Battlefields		
Creative Arts	Fine Arts	Carroll Cloar	United States Air Force		Painting		
Creative Arts	Fine Arts	Barse Miller	United States Army		Painting: Sacramento River region		
Creative Arts	Music Composition	John Ayres Lessard	United States Army		Composing	Also won in 1953	
Humanities	American Literature	Stephen Addison Larrabee	United States Army		Critical study of Hellenism in American literature		
Humanities	General Nonfiction	Bradford Smith	United States Office of War Information		Japanese immigration to the United States	Also won in 1945	
Humanities	History of Science and Technology	James R. Newman	Office of War Mobilization		Social economical implications of atomic energy	Also won in 1947	
Humanities	Near Eastern Studies	Franz Rosenthal	United States Army	United States Department of State	Muslim historiography		
Humanities	Philosophy	Charles Alexander Moore	Army Medical Department	University of Hawaii			
Humanities	Philosophy	William Donald Oliver	United States Army Air Forces	University of Minnesota			
Natural Sciences	Chemistry	Elwood Vernon Jensen	United States chemical weapons program	University of Chicago	Chemistry of natural products		
Natural Sciences	Earth Science	Ernest Robert Tinkham	United States Army Air Forces		Certain aspects of the biology of the North American deserts		
Natural Sciences	Mathematics	G. Baley Price		University of Kansas			
Natural Sciences	Mathematics	John Williams Calkin				Also won in 1945	
Natural Sciences	Molecular and Cellular Biology	James Thomas Culbertson	Office of Scientific Research and Development	Columbia University	Biography of Patrick Manson	Also won in 1936	
Natural Sciences	Molecular and Cellular Biology	Arthur William Galston	United States Navy	California Institute of Technology	Research at Yale University	Also won in 1950	
Natural Sciences	Physics	John Archibald Wheeler		Princeton University	Problem of measurement in electron theory	Also won in 1949	
Natural Sciences	Plant Science	Donovan Stewart Correll	United States Navy	Harvard University		Also won in 1959	
Social Science	Psychology	Donald Vincent McGranahan	United States Army		Psychological study of the German people		
Social Science	Sociology	Herbert Aptheker	United States Army		Documentary History of the Negro People (published 1951)		

== 1946 U.S. and Canadian Fellows ==
Category	Field of Study	Fellow	Institutional association	Research topic	Notes	Ref
Creative Arts	Drama and Performance Art	Arthur Ranous Wilmurt	Yale University	Creative writing		
Creative Arts	Fiction	Gwendolyn Brooks		Writing	Also won in 1947	
Creative Arts	Fiction	Roger Lemelin		Writing	Also won in 1957	
Creative Arts	Fiction	Carson McCullers		Writing	Also won in 1942	
Creative Arts	Fiction	James Still		Writing	Also won in 1941	
Creative Arts	Fiction	Virginia Eggertsen Sorensen Waugh		Research in Mexico	Also won in 1954	
Creative Arts	Film	Maya Deren		Anthropological study of the Vodudun in Haiti		
Creative Arts	Fine Arts	Eugene Berman		Painting	Also won in 1948	
Creative Arts	Fine Arts	Robert Noel Blair	Art Institute of Buffalo	Painting	Also won in 1951	
Creative Arts	Fine Arts	Morris Cole Graves		Painting		
Creative Arts	Fine Arts	Mitchell Jamieson		Painting	Also won in 1948	
Creative Arts	Fine Arts	Berta Margoulies		Sculpture		
Creative Arts	Fine Arts	Merritt Mauzey		Etchings: The Cotton Series		
Creative Arts	Fine Arts	Ruth Nickerson		Sculpture		
Creative Arts	Music Composition	William Bergsma	Juilliard School of Music (visiting)	Composing	Also won in 1951	
Creative Arts	Music Composition	Henry Dreyfuss Brant		Composing	Also won in 1955	
Creative Arts	Music Composition	Alexei Haieff		Composing	Also won in 1949	
Creative Arts	Music Composition	Gian Carlo Menotti		Composing	Also won in 1947	
Creative Arts	Music Composition	Harold Samuel Shapero		Composing	Also won in 1947	
Creative Arts	Music Composition	Louise Juliette Talma	Hunter College	Composing	Also won in 1947	
Creative Arts	Music Composition	John Weedon Verrall	Mount Holyoke College	Composing		
Creative Arts	Photography	Ansel Adams			Also won in 1948, 1959	
Creative Arts	Photography	Wayne Forest Miller		Black Chicagoans	Also won in 1947	
Creative Arts	Photography	Wright Morris		Life in rural Nebraska	Also won in 1942, 1954	
Creative Arts	Photography	Eliot Furness Porter			Also won in 1941	
Creative Arts	Photography	G. E. Kidder Smith				
Creative Arts	Poetry	Randall Jarrell	The Nation	Writing		
Creative Arts	Poetry	George Zabriskie	Marietta College	Writing	Also won in 1942	
Humanities	American Literature	Richard Gordon Lillard	Indiana University	Part played in American history by the forest between the Atlantic Ocean and the Mississippi River	Also won in 1945	
Humanities	American Literature	Warren Stenson Tryon	Simmons College	History of Ticknor and Fields		
Humanities	Bibliography	William Richard Matthews	University of California, Los Angeles	Preparation of a descriptive bibliography of British diaries and memoirs	Also won in 1958	
Humanities	Biography	Robert Cecil Bald	Cornell University	John Donne	Also won in 1960	
Humanities	Biography	Marie Kimball	Thomas Jefferson Memorial Foundation	Life of Thomas Jefferson for the period of 1776-1789	Also won in 1945	
Humanities	British History	Arthur J. Marder	University of Hawaii	History of British sea power in the dreadnought era	Also won in 1941, 1947	
Humanities	Classics	Henry Rudolph Immerwahr		Monograph on popular speech in ancient Athens, based primarily on a collection of Athenian vase inscriptions		
Humanities	Classics	Alice Elizabeth Kober	Brooklyn College	Attempt to decipher the so-called Minoan scripts found at Knossos, Crete		
Humanities	Classics	James Henry Oliver	Columbia University	History of the Adriatic in antiquity	Also won in 1955	
Humanities	English Literature	Robert Hamilton Ball	Queens College, CUNY			
Humanities	English Literature	Jerome Hamilton Buckley	University of Wisconsin	Victorian literary and aesthetic theory in the light of 19th-century social conditions and intellectual values	Also won in 1963	
Humanities	English Literature	Gordon Sherman Haight	Yale University	Complete edition of the letters of George Eliot	Also won in 1953, 1960	
Humanities	English Literature	Paul Harold Kocher	University of Washington	Relations between religion and science during the English Renaissance	Also won in 1955	
Humanities	English Literature	Louis A. Landa			Also won in 1966	
Humanities	English Literature	Ernest Albert Strathmann	Pomona College	Life and works of Walter Raleigh as an exemplar of skeptical tendencies in Elizabethan thought	Also won in 1954	
Humanities	Fine Arts Research	Jean Charlot	Smith College	History of modern Mexican mural painting	Also won in 1944	
Humanities	Fine Arts Research	Frederick Hartt		Monograph on the art of Giulio Romano and studies of the religious content in renaissance and baroque art	Also won in 1954	
Humanities	Folklore and Popular Culture	Louis Clark Jones	New York State College for Teachers	Contemporary folklore of the supernatural as found among various ethnic groups in New York state		
Humanities	Folklore and Popular Culture	Alan Lomax				
Humanities	French History	Leo Gershoy	Sarah Lawrence College	Biography of Marshal Pétain	Also won in 1936, 1939, 1959	
Humanities	General Nonfiction	Cedric Belfrage				
Humanities	General Nonfiction	Josef Berger	Democratic National Committee	Soviet Union, "especially concerning its young citizens"	Also won in 1938	
Humanities	German and East European History	Hans Rosenberg	Brooklyn College	History of the Prusso-German Junkers as a social class	Also won in 1945	
Humanities	German and Scandinavian Literature	Alrik Gustafson	University of Minnesota	Biography of August Strindberg	Also won in 1945	
Humanities	History of Science and Technology	Marshall Clagett	Columbia University	Richard Swineshead and his place in the history of science in general and the history of physics and calculus in particular	Also won in 1950	
Humanities	History of Science and Technology	Herbert Silvette	University of Virginia School of Medicine	Life of Philemon Holland		
Humanities	Latin American Literature	Robert Hayward Barlow		History of the empire of Montezuma	Also won in 1947	
Humanities	Linguistics	Roman Jakobson				
Humanities	Linguistics	Wolf Leslau	École libre des hautes études	Languages, traditional history, and folklore of Ethiopia	Also won in 1947	
Humanities	Literary Criticism	Huntington Brown	University of Minnesota	Types of prose style		
Humanities	Literary Criticism	Walter B. C. Watkins			Also won in 1950	
Humanities	Literary Criticism	William Kurtz Wimsatt, Jr	Yale University	Relationship between form and content in literary art		
Humanities	Medieval Literature	Mary Hatch Marshall	Colby College	History of medieval religious plays	Also won in 1945	
Humanities	Medieval Literature	Robert Armstrong Pratt	Queens College	Intellectual development of Chaucer	Also won in 1954	
Humanities	Medieval Literature	Theodore Silverstein	University of Kansas City	Bernard Silvestris and his place in the history of science and learning		
Humanities	Medieval Literature	Francis Lee Utley	Ohio State University	Apocryphal stories of the Flood, derived and amplified from Biblical text	Also won in 1947, 1952	
Humanities	Music Research	Edward Elias Lowinsky	Black Mountain College		Also won in 1976	
Humanities	Music Research	Emanuel Winternitz	Metropolitan Museum of Art			
Humanities	Philosophy	Nelson Goodman	Tufts College	Applied logic		
Humanities	Philosophy	Maurice Mandelbaum	Swarthmore College	Ethical theory		
Humanities	Russian History	George P. Fedotov	Saint Vladimir's Orthodox Theological Seminary	History of the Russian religious mind in the Middle Ages		
Humanities	United States History	Holman Hamilton		Inner history of Zachary Taylor's administration		
Humanities	United States History	Arthur M. Schlesinger, Jr.		Political-intellectual history of the period of the New Deal		
Natural Sciences	Applied Science	Chaim Leib Pekeris			Also won in 1968, 1972	
Natural Sciences	Astronomy and Astrophysics	Kaj Aage Gunnar Strand	Swarthmore College	Orbital motion in double and multiple stars by photographic observations		
Natural Sciences	Chemistry	William Howard Barnes	McGill University	Comparative studies of X-ray diffraction methods for the determination of the structure of crystalline materials		
Natural Sciences	Chemistry	Paul Antoine Giguère	Laval University	Molecular structure of hydrogen peroxide by the spectroscopic method	Also won in 1948	
Natural Sciences	Chemistry	James Lynn Hoard	Cornell University	Special methods of analyzing the X-ray data used in the determination of crystal structure	Also won in 1960, 1966	
Natural Sciences	Mathematics	Richard Hubert Bruck	University of Wisconsin	Theory of loops		
Natural Sciences	Mathematics	Paul Erdős	University of Michigan, Ann Arbor		Also won in 1945	
Natural Sciences	Mathematics	Mark Kac		Random processes and their applications to statistical physics, with particular emphasis on applications to Brownian motion and random noise		
Natural Sciences	Mathematics	Paul Charles Rosenbloom	Brown University			
Natural Sciences	Mathematics	Irving Ezra Segal	Institute for Advanced Study		Also won in 1951, 1967	
Natural Sciences	Mathematics	Abraham H. Taub	University of Washington	Shock waves; differential geometry	Also won in 1953	
Natural Sciences	Mathematics	John William Theodore Youngs	Purdue University			
Natural Sciences	Medicine and Health	Evelyn Anderson Haymaker	University of California			
Natural Sciences	Molecular and Cellular Biology	Daniel I. Arnon	University of California		Also won in 1962	
Natural Sciences	Molecular and Cellular Biology	Arthur Charles Giese	Stanford University	Fundamental nature of the effect of ultraviolet radiation on protoplasma	Also won in 1958	
Natural Sciences	Molecular and Cellular Biology	Walter John Nickerson	Wheaton College	Taxonomy and comparative biochemistry of yeasts		
Natural Sciences	Organismic Biology and Ecology	Robert Ballentine	Columbia University			
Natural Sciences	Organismic Biology and Ecology	Rolf Ling Bolin	Stanford University	Lantern fish and their classification based on specimens in North America, Europe, Asia, and Australia		
Natural Sciences	Organismic Biology and Ecology	Wilbert McLeod Chapman	California Academy of Sciences			
Natural Sciences	Organismic Biology and Ecology	A. Starker Leopold	Pan American Union			
Natural Sciences	Organismic Biology and Ecology	Alexander Frank Skutch			Also won in 1951	
Natural Sciences	Organismic Biology and Ecology	Lemen Jonathan Wells	University of Minnesota	Research at Carnegie Laboratory of Embryology		
Natural Sciences	Physics	Wayne Eskett Hazen	University of California	Cosmic rays at high altitude	Also won in 1953	
Natural Sciences	Physics	Shuichi Kusaka		Research at the California Institute of Technology and the Institute for Advanced Study with J. Robert Oppenheimer and Wolfgang Pauli		
Natural Sciences	Physics	William George McMillan		Research at the University of Chicago		
Natural Sciences	Physics	Robert Leroy Platzman		Research with Niels Bohr at University of Copenhagen		
Natural Sciences	Physics	James Alfred Van Allen	Johns Hopkins University	Atomic energy		
Natural Sciences	Plant Science	Bernard Boivin		Classification of plants		
Natural Sciences	Plant Science	Hugh Carson Cutler	Harvard University	Preparation of an illustrated flora of the orchidaceae	Also won in 1942	
Natural Sciences	Plant Science	Francis Raymond Fosberg	United States Department of Agriculture	Monograph of the genus Cinchona		
Natural Sciences	Plant Science	Harold E. Moore			Also won in 1955	
Natural Sciences	Plant Science	Albert Charles Smith	Harvard University	Botanical explorations of the Fiji Islands		
Natural Sciences	Plant Science	Thomas Wallace Whitaker	United States Department of Agriculture		Also won in 1958	
Natural Sciences	Statistics	Theodore W. Anderson	Columbia University			
Natural Sciences	Statistics	Henry Scheffé	University of California, Los Angeles	Research at the University of California, Berkeley		
Social Science	Anthropology and Cultural Studies	Gregory Bateson				
Social Science	Anthropology and Cultural Studies	Joseph Benjamin Birdsell			Also won in 1952	
Social Science	Anthropology and Cultural Studies	James Alfred Ford				
Social Science	Anthropology and Cultural Studies	Clyde K. Kluckhohn	Harvard University	Anthropology of contemporary problems		
Social Science	Anthropology and Cultural Studies	Weston La Barre				
Social Science	Anthropology and Cultural Studies	Morris Swadesh			Also won in 1947	
Social Science	Economics	Philip D. Bradley	Harvard University	Public finance in certain Latin American republics		
Social Science	Economics	Sanford Alexander Mosk	University of California			
Social Science	Political Science	Harwood Lawrence Childs	Princeton University	Public opinion, based in part on his experience in the Office of War Information	Also won in 1937	
Social Science	Political Science	Mitchell Franklin	Tulane University	Edward Livingston and his influence on Thomas Jefferson and the Jeffersonian jurists, on the French jurists of Louisiana, on the constitutional thought of Andrew Jackson, and on the codification theory of Bentham		
Social Science	Political Science	Willmoore Kendall		Analysis of the political writings of Jean Jacques Rousseau "from the standpoint of the debate about majority-rule in the modern state"		
Social Science	Political Science	Franz Leopold Neumann	Bureau of Intelligence and Research; Columbia University	Possible principles of joint action by the United States, Great Britain, and the Soviet Union in the disputed areas		
Social Science	Political Science	Walter Bernhard Schiffer	Institute for Advanced Study	Conflicting theoretical ideas underlying the League of Nations	Also won in 1944	

== 1946 Latin American and Caribbean Fellows ==
Category	Field of Study	Fellow	Institutional association	Research topic	Notes	Ref
Creative Arts	Fine Arts	José Alonso			Also won in 1945	
Creative Arts	Music Composition	Alberto Evaristo Ginastera		Composing	Also won in 1942, 1969	
Creative Arts	Music Composition	Héctor Tosar		Composing	Also won in 1960	
Humanities	Architecture, Planning and Design	Joao Batista Vilanova Artigas				
Humanities	Iberian and Latin American History	Carlos Bosch García	El Colegio de México	Mexican diplomatic history		
Humanities	Iberian and Latin American History	Julio Le Riverend Brusone	El Colegio de México	Development of the sugar industry in Cuba from its beginning until 1860		
Humanities	Latin American Literature	R. Fernando Alegría				
Humanities	Linguistics	Cecilio Lopez				
Humanities	Philosophy	José María Ferrater Mora	University of Santiago		Also won in 1948	
Natural Science	Astronomy and Astrophysics	Paris Pişmiş	National Astronomical Observatory			
Natural Science	Earth Science	Elysiário Távora Filho	University of Brazil			
Natural Science	Medicine and Health	René Honorato Cienfuegos	University of Chile			
Natural Science	Molecular and Cellular Biology	Otto Guilherme Bier			Also won in 1941, 1945	
Natural Science	Organismic Biology and Ecology	João Moojen de Oliveira	Ministry of Education and Public Health			
Natural Science	Organismic Biology and Ecology	Luis René Rivas y Díaz	Colegio De La Salle		Also won in 1945	
Natural Science	Organismic Biology and Ecology	Bernardo Villa Ramírez	University of Kansas		Also won in 1945	
Natural Science	Plant Sciences	Moisés Kramer				
Social Science	Anthropology and Cultural Studies	Pedro Armillas	National Institute of Anthropology and History; National School of Anthropology and History	Comparative studies of the pre-Columbian cultures of the southeastern United States and of Mexico and Central America		
Social Science	Psychology	Horacio José Ambrosio Rimoldi		Research with Louis Leon Thurstone		

== See also ==
- Guggenheim Fellowship
- List of Guggenheim Fellowships awarded in 1945
- List of Guggenheim Fellowships awarded in 1947
