= Sarasola =

Sarasola is a surname of Basque origin. Notable people with this surname include:

- Elixabete Sarasola (born 1991), Spanish footballer
- Enrique Sarasola (1937–2002), Spanish industrialist
- Iñigo Sarasola (born 1987), Spanish footballer
- Izarne Sarasola (born 2002), Spanish footballer
- Julieta Sarasola (born 1997), Argentine psychologist
- Simón Sarasola (1871–1947), Spanish meteorologist and Jesuit priest
