= 1889 Atlantic hurricane season =

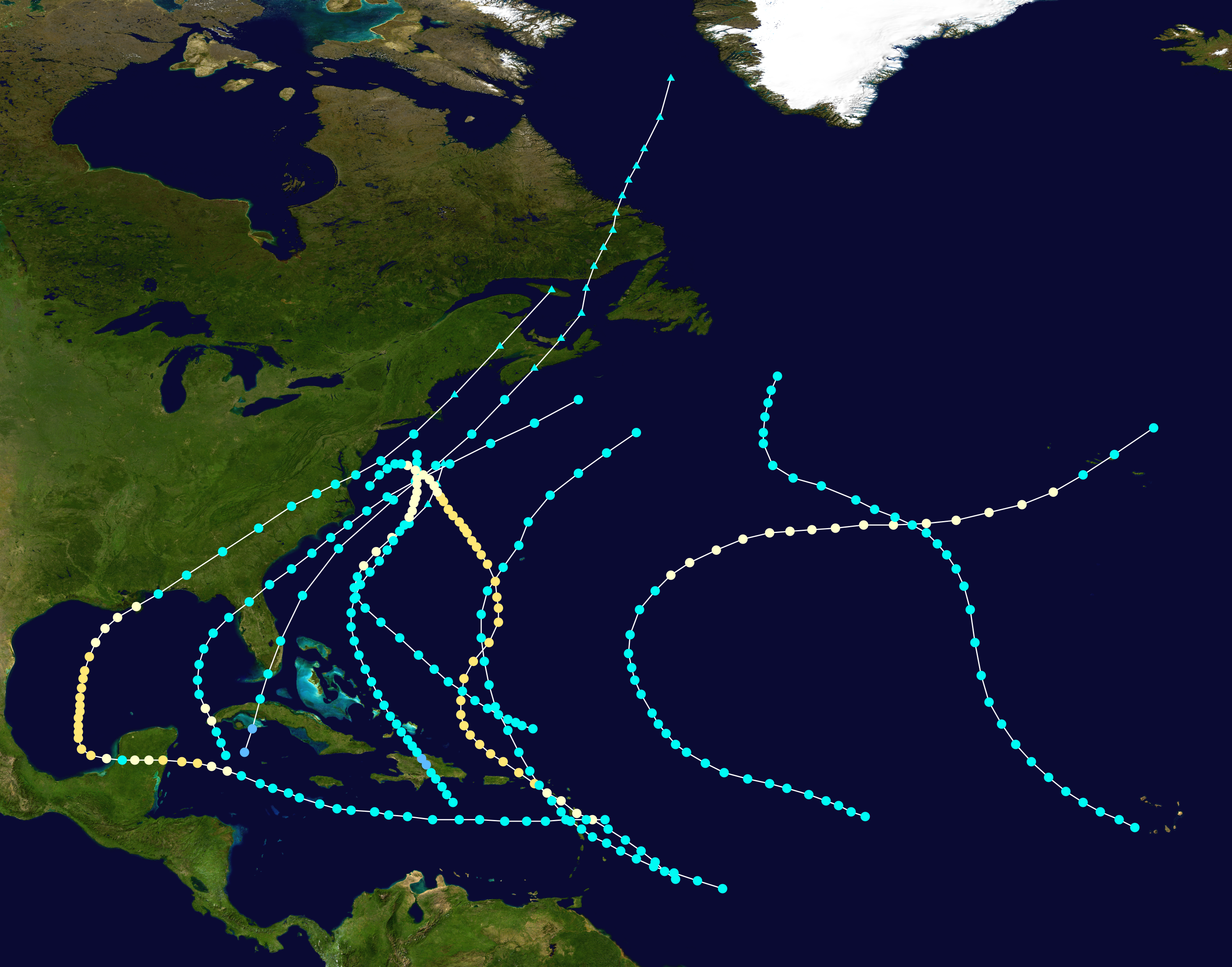
- Season summary map

Seasonal boundaries
- First system formed: May 16, 1889
- Last system dissipated: October 7, 1889

Strongest storm
- Name: Six
  - Maximum winds: 110 mph (175 km/h) (1-minute sustained)

Seasonal statistics
- Total storms: 9
- Hurricanes: 6
- Major hurricanes (Cat. 3+): 0
- Total fatalities: 40
- Total damage: Unknown

The 1889 Atlantic hurricane season featured the first known tropical cyclone in the basin to attain hurricane status in the month of May. Of the nine known tropical storms, six intensified into hurricanes, but none of those strengthened into a major hurricane. (Note: A major hurricane is a storm that ranks as Category 3 or higher on the Saffir–Simpson hurricane wind scale.) However, in the absence of modern satellite and other remote-sensing technologies, only storms that affected populated land areas or encountered ships at sea were recorded, so the actual total could be higher. Therefore, an undercount bias of zero to six tropical cyclones per year between 1851 and 1885 and zero to four per year between 1886 and 1910 has been estimated. The first system was initially over the western Atlantic Ocean on May 16, while the ninth and final storm transitioned into an extratropical cyclone just prior to striking Nova Scotia on October 7.

Neither meteorologists José Fernández-Partagás and Henry F. Diaz in 1996 nor the Atlantic hurricane reanalysis project in the early 21st century added or removed any previously undocumented storms from the official hurricane database (HURDAT). However, both modified the tracks of several cyclones. Additionally, a damage study conducted by Cuban meteorologist Ramón Pérez Suárez in 2000 led to the second system being reclassified from a tropical storm to a Category 1 hurricane on the present-day Saffir–Simpson scale. More recently, a 2014 reanalysis study by climate researcher Michael Chenoweth recommended the removal of the ninth storm and the addition of four cyclones not currently listed in HURDAT. However, these proposals have not yet been approved.

The most intense tropical cyclone of the season, the six system, peaked as a Category 2 hurricane with maximum sustained winds of 110 mph (175 km/h) in September. Passing through the Leeward Islands and then striking Mexico's Yucatán Peninsula and the Gulf Coast of the United States, the storm left destruction in many places, including about $40,000 (1889 USD) in damage and one death in the Jacksonville area of Florida. (Note: All damage figures are in 1889 USD, unless otherwise noted) Also that month, the season's fourth system, which also peaked as a Category 2 hurricane, severely impacted the Lesser Antilles and the Northeastern United States, despite not making landfall in the latter. The United States reported almost $2.36 million in damage and 40 deaths. In June, the second cyclone of the season may have also caused fatalities in Cuba.

== Season summary ==
The Atlantic hurricane database (HURDAT) officially recognizes that nine tropical cyclones formed during the 1889 season, six of which strengthened into a hurricane, while none of those intensified into a major hurricane. Neither meteorologists José Fernández-Partagás and Henry F. Diaz in 1996 nor the Atlantic hurricane reanalysis project in the early 21st century added or removed any previously undocumented storms from HURDAT, though both modified the tracks of several cyclones. A damage study conducted by Cuban meteorologist Ramón Pérez Suárez in 2000 led to the season's second storm being retroactively upgraded to a Category 1 hurricane. However, a more recent reanalysis by climate researcher Michael Chenoweth, published in 2014, adds four storms and removes one – the ninth system – for a net gain of three cyclones, although these proposed changes have yet to be approved for inclusion to HURDAT. Chenoweth's study utilizes a more extensive collection of newspapers and ship logs, as well as late 19th century weather maps for the first time, in comparison to previous reanalysis projects.

Tropical cyclogenesis began by mid-May, with a tropical storm first detected north of the Lesser Antilles on May 16. Reaching hurricane status, this storm became the first Atlantic cyclone to reach hurricane status in the month of May and one of only four on record. After it became extratropical on May 21, no further activity is known to have occurred until June 15. Striking Cuba likely as a hurricane and Florida as a tropical storm, the system was last noted on June 20 south of Nova Scotia. Another lengthy period of dormancy then occurred, with the season's third system not being observed until August 19. The storm crossed the Dominican Republic and the Turks and Caicos Islands and continued northward before being last noted on August 28 offshore the Northeastern United States. September featured five cyclones, three of which became hurricanes. The season's fourth system caused 40 deaths and almost $2.36 million in damage in the United States despite not making landfall there. Later that month, the sixth storm of the season peaked as a Category 2 hurricane with maximum sustained winds of 110 mph (175 km/h). Passing through the Leeward Islands and then striking the Yucatán Peninsula, Louisiana, and Alabama, the storm left destruction in many places, including about $40,000 in damage and one death in the Jacksonville area of Florida. One additional cyclone, which peaked as a tropical storm, moved rapidly northeastward, crossing Cuba and Florida before becoming extratropical while approaching Nova Scotia on October 7, marking the end of known seasonal activity.

The season's activity was reflected with an accumulated cyclone energy (ACE) rating of 104, the fourth highest total of the decade. ACE is a metric used to express the energy used by a tropical cyclone during its lifetime. Therefore, a storm with a longer duration will have higher values of ACE. It is only calculated at six-hour increments in which specific tropical and subtropical systems are either at or above sustained wind speeds of 39 mph (63 km/h), which is the threshold for tropical storm intensity. Thus, tropical depressions are not included here.

== Systems ==
=== Hurricane One ===
- Category 1 hurricane (SSHWS)
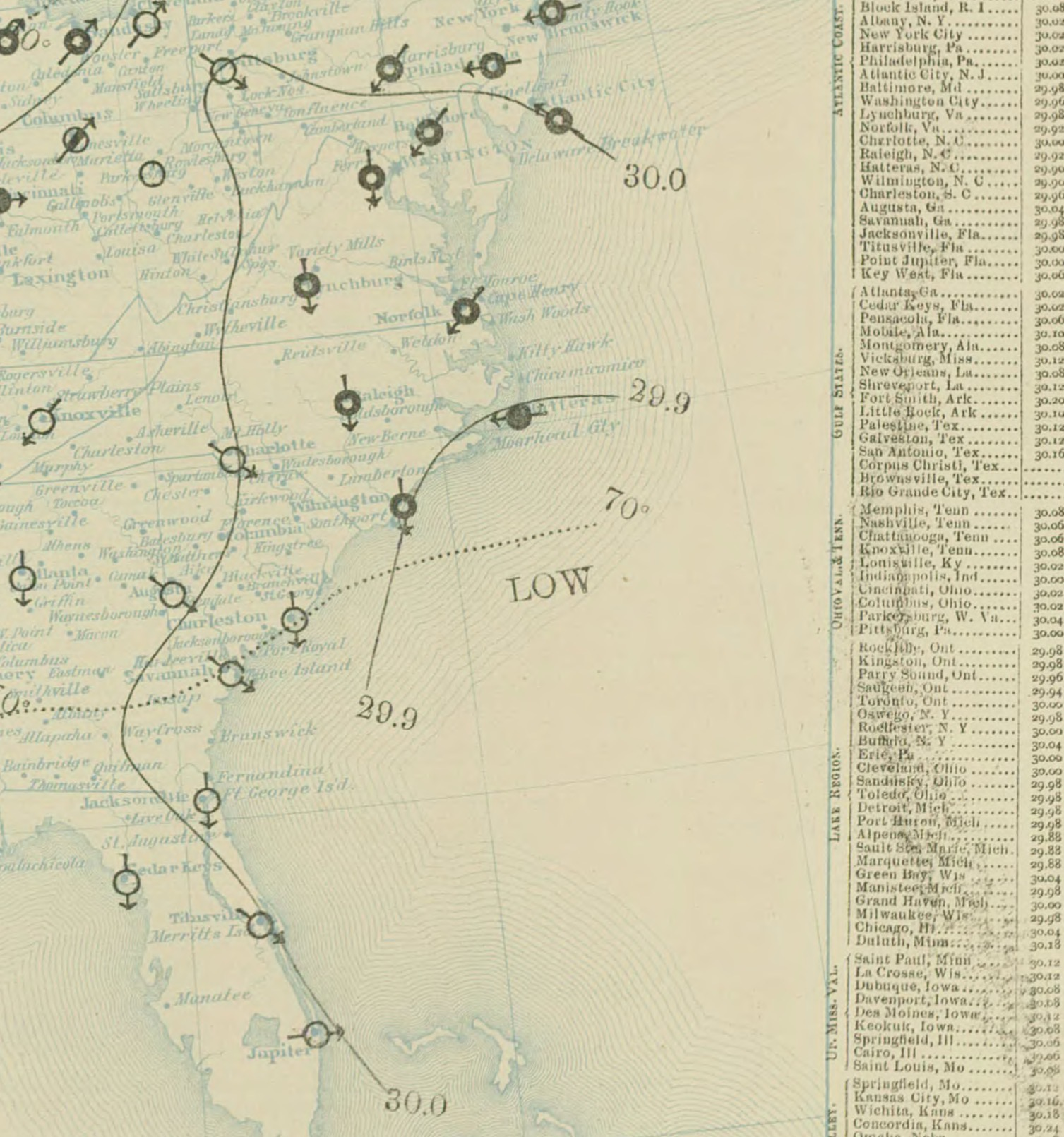
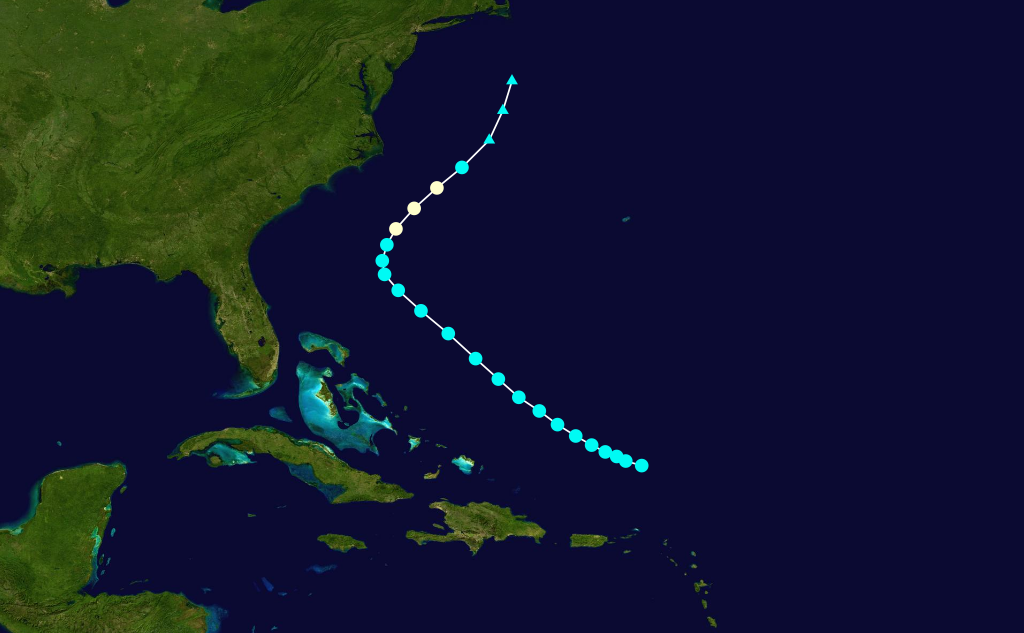
- Duration: May 16 – May 21
- Peak intensity: 80 mph (130 km/h) (1-min);

Based on the Monthly Weather Review reporting a disturbance of "moderate intensity" to the north of the Lesser Antilles beginning on May 16, the Atlantic hurricane database initiates the track for this system on that date about 190 mi (310 km) north of the British Virgin Islands. The cyclone strengthened slightly but remained a tropical storm for the next few days as it headed northwestward, until turning northeastward by May 20. Several hours later, the storm intensified into a hurricane and reached sustained winds of 80 mph (130 km/h), based on the schooner Joseph W. Fish observing sustained winds of 58 mph (93 km/h) and another ship recording an unspecific hurricane-force sustained wind speed on the following day. However, the system weakened to a tropical storm early on May 21 and soon transitioned into an extratropical cyclone about 270 mi (435 km) east of Nags Head, North Carolina.

This cyclone was the first May hurricane on record in the Atlantic basin, and remains one of only four such systems known today. Climate researcher Michael Chenoweth's 2014 study indicates that this system developed as a tropical depression just north of the Mona Passage on May 16. Other significant changes include that storm intensifying into a hurricane on May 21, as opposed to becoming extratropical that day, a transition that instead occurred on May 22. The extratropical remnants later struck Nova Scotia.

=== Hurricane Two ===
- Category 1 hurricane (SSHWS)
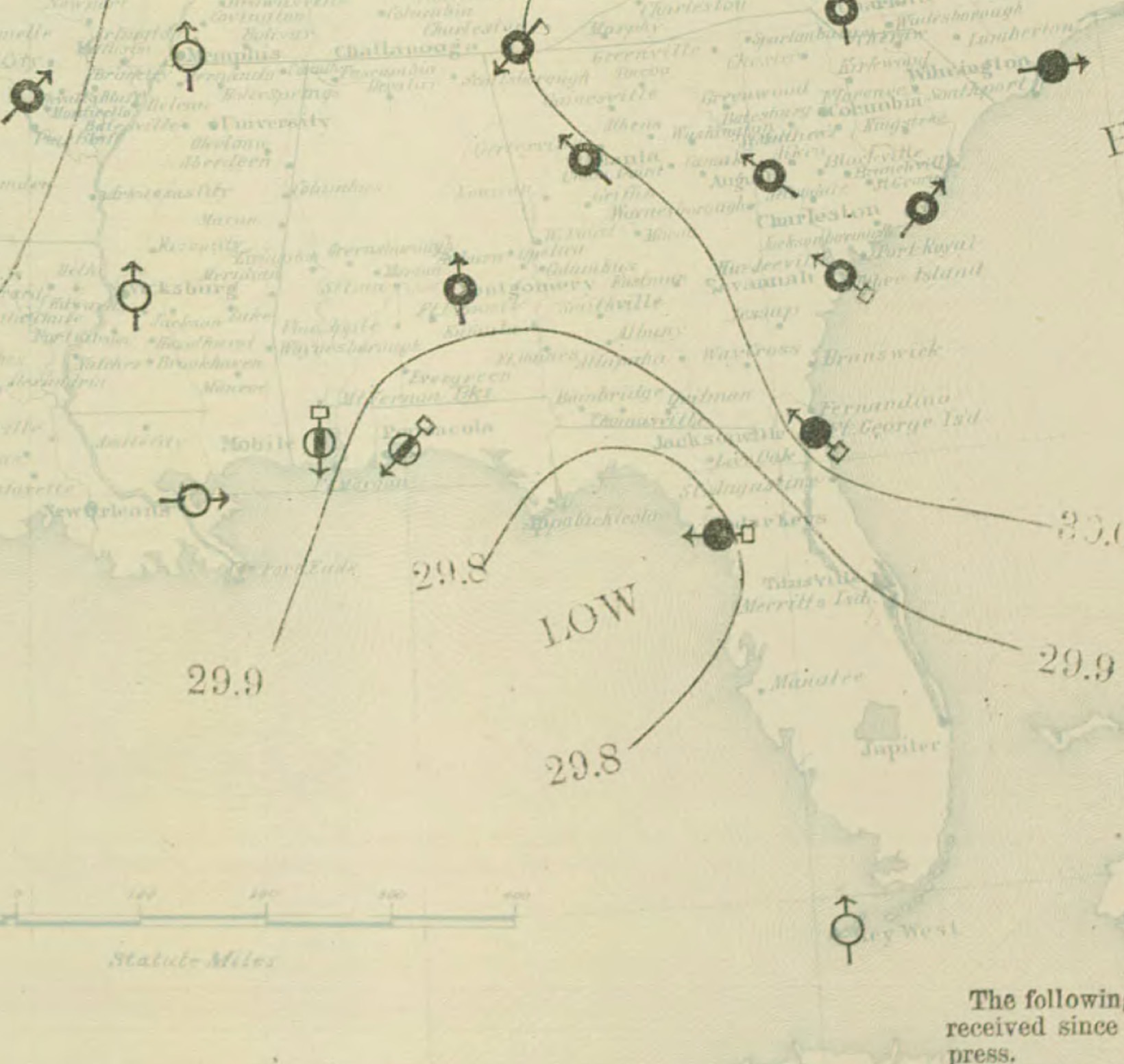
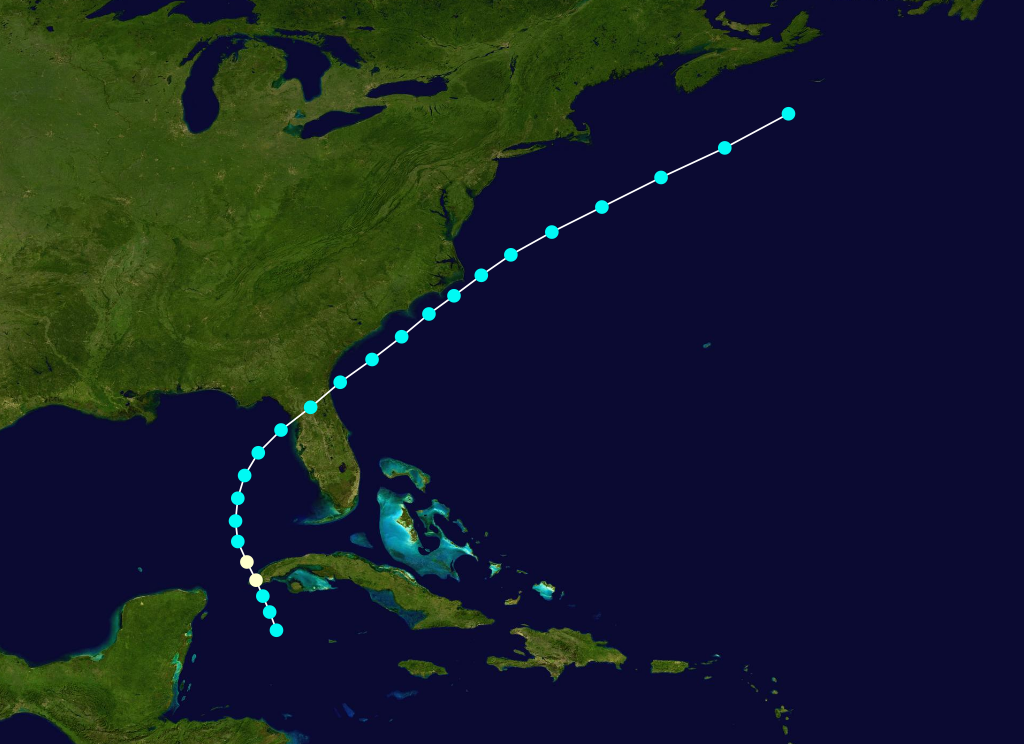
- Duration: June 15 – June 20
- Peak intensity: 75 mph (120 km/h) (1-min);

Maritime observations indicated the presence of a tropical storm over the northwestern Caribbean as early as June 15. Moving north-northwestward, the cyclone struck the Guanahacabibes Peninsula of Cuba several hours later, likely as a minimal hurricane with sustained winds of 75 mph (120 km/h), according to a study of wind damage conducted by meteorologist Ramón Pérez Suárez in 2000. However, the hurricane weakened back to a tropical storm shortly after reaching the Gulf of Mexico on June 16. Gradually curving northeastward on June 17, the system made landfall near Cedar Key, Florida, with winds of 50 mph (85 km/h) around 14:00 UTC. After emerging into the Atlantic from the First Coast on the following day, the system remained closely offshore Georgia, South Carolina, and North Carolina. The cyclone was last noted on June 20 about 115 mi (185 km) southwest of Sable Island, Nova Scotia.

Chenoweth's study suggests that the storm did not strike Cuba and instead moved through the Yucatán Channel before striking Florida farther south, near present-day Sarasota. Heavy rains fell over western Cuba, inundating many streets. Walls and house collapsed, particularly in Batabanó and the Vuelta Abajo region. Several vessels also capsized. The Daily Inter Ocean noted that no deaths occurred, but Spanish meteorologist Simón Sarasola reported that "lives were lost". Although the highest recorded sustained wind speed in Florida reached only 43 mph (69 km/h) at Cedar Key, heavy precipitation fell across the state, causing several washouts along the South Florida Railroad. Additionally, a tornado in Lake Mary downed some trees and destroyed a large packinghouse.

=== Hurricane Three ===
- Category 1 hurricane (SSHWS)
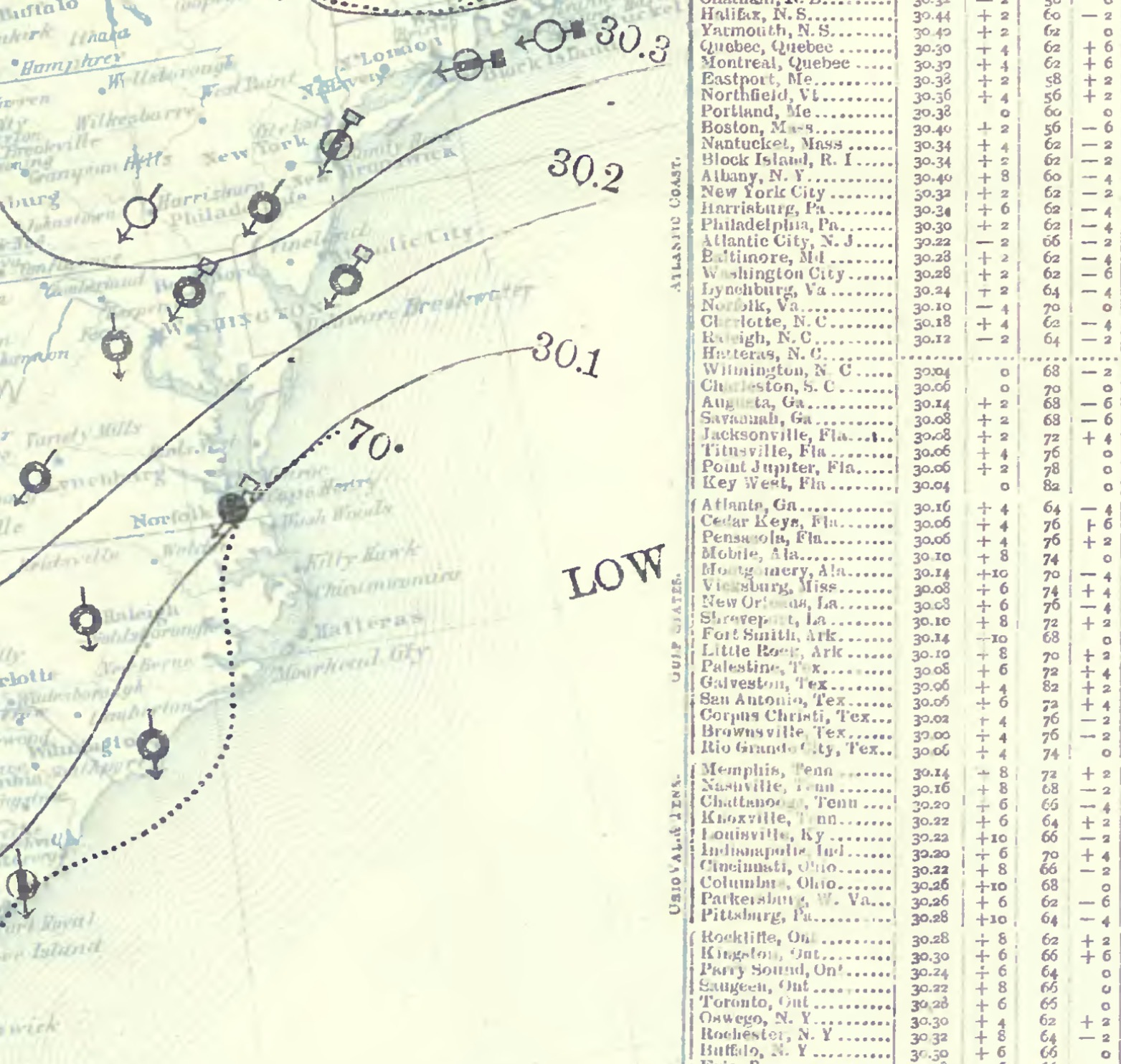
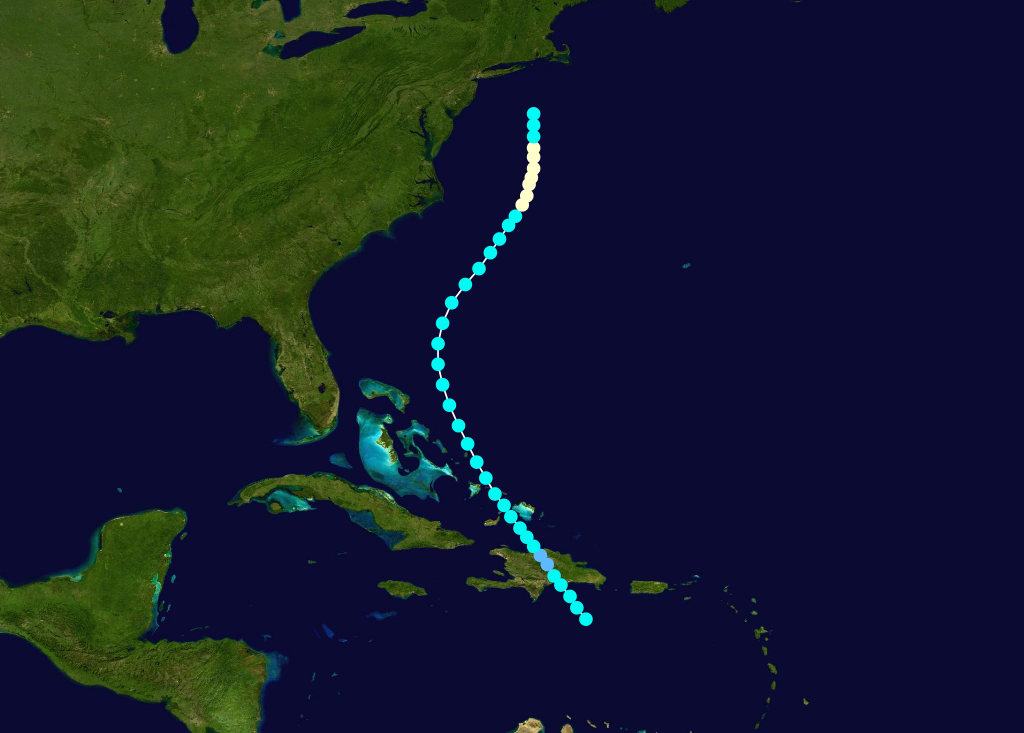
- Duration: August 19 – August 28
- Peak intensity: 80 mph (130 km/h) (1-min); ≤996 mbar (hPa)

Land-based weather stations first reported this storm about 100 mi (160 km) south of the Dominican Republic on August 19. Several hours later, the cyclone made landfall in the country near Baní with winds of 60 mph (95 km/h). Santo Domingo observed a barometric pressure of 996 mbar (29.4 inHg). Due to moving across rugged terrain, the system likely weakened to a tropical depression, but re-intensified into a tropical storm after emerging into the Atlantic near on August 20. The storm then passed through the southeastern Bahamas and Turks and Caicos Islands early the next day while moving northwestward. By August 24, the cyclone curved northeastward while well offshore the East Coast of the United States. Based on the Monthly Weather Review noting that various ships recorded hurricane-force winds, the system intensified into a hurricane on August 26 and peaked with winds of 80 mph (130 km/h). Turning northward, the hurricane began weakening on August 28, falling to tropical storm intensity before being last noted approximately 160 mi (260 km) east-southeast of Atlantic City, New Jersey.

Chenoweth could not confirm the existence of this cyclone, citing "unreliable" reports from the Dominican Republic "and absence of evidence from daily weather map series". In the Greater Antilles, the storm caused falling barometric pressures and increased wind speeds from the Dominican Republic to as far west as Havana, Cuba. Santo Domingo in the former recorded sustained winds of 60 mph (95 km/h). The cyclone and its remnants produced gales along the coast of the Mid-Atlantic and New England. On August 29, sustained winds reached 40 mph (64 km/h) in Asbury Park, New Jersey.

=== Hurricane Four ===
- Category 2 hurricane (SSHWS)
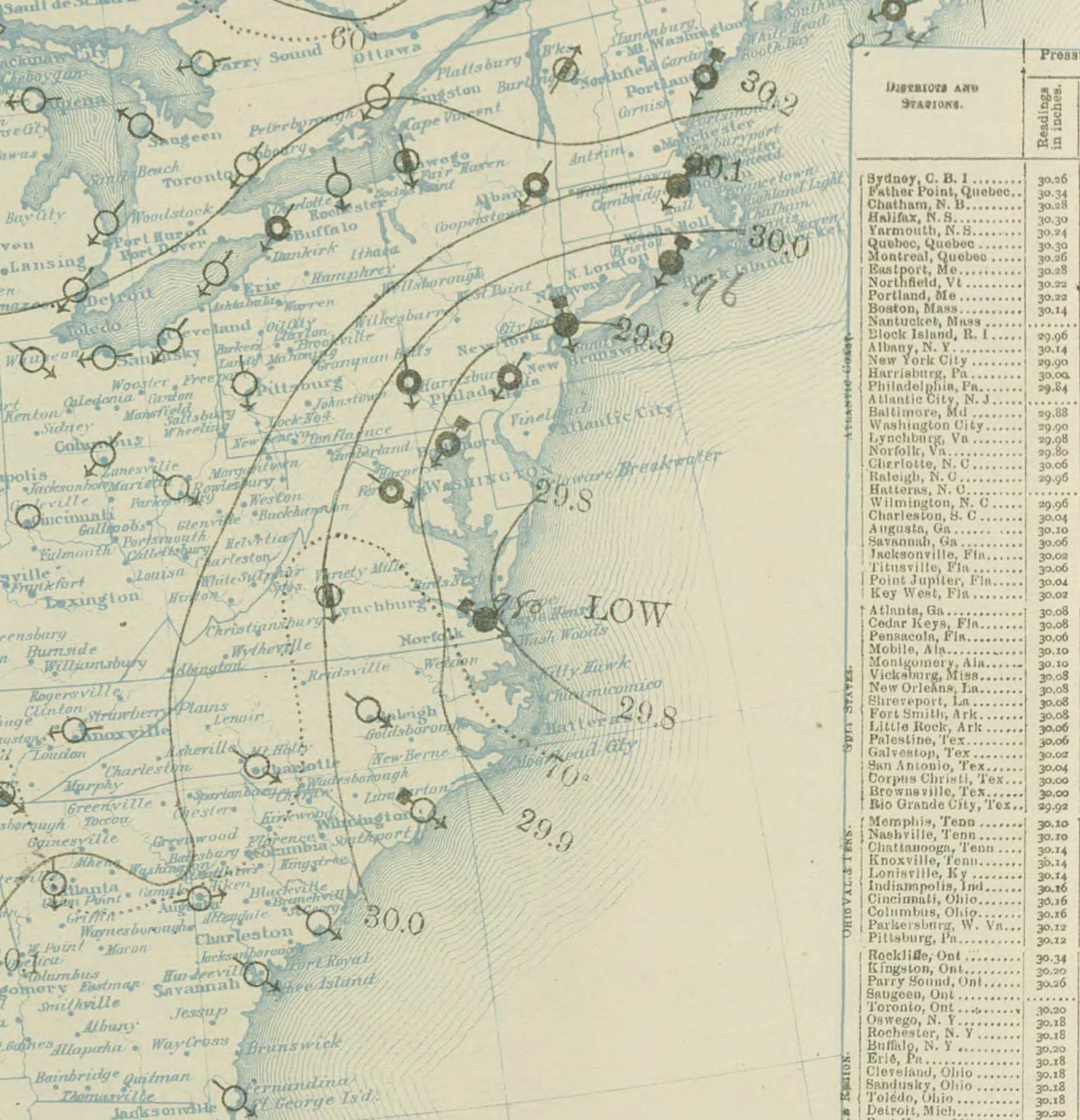
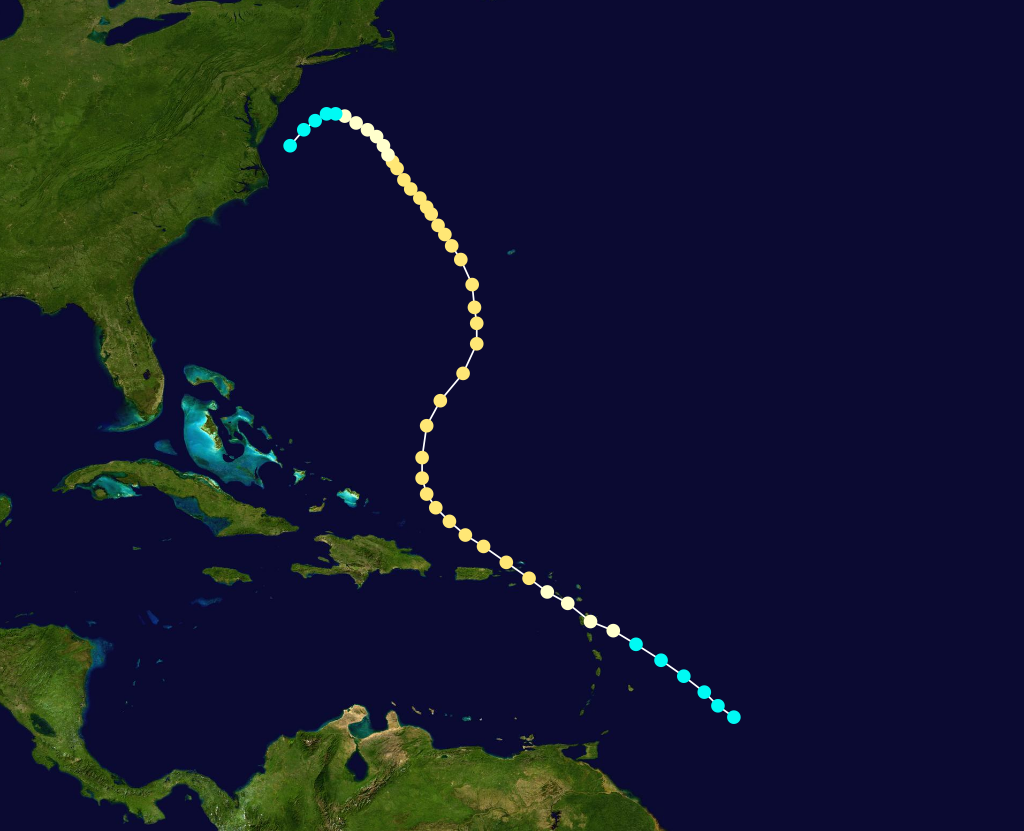
- Duration: September 1 – September 12
- Peak intensity: 105 mph (165 km/h) (1-min); ≤981 mbar (hPa)

Hurricane San Martín of 1889

A tropical storm was first reported about 300 mi (485 km) east-southeast of Barbados on September 1. Moving northwestward, the cyclone strengthened into a hurricane on the next day, shortly before striking Guadeloupe. The storm intensified into a Category 2 hurricane on the modern-day Saffir–Simpson scale over the Anegada Passage on September 3, based on Saint Thomas observing a barometric pressure of 981 mbar (29.0 inHg). Shortly thereafter, the cyclone crossed over the Virgin Islands and re-emerged into the Atlantic. Beginning on September 5, the storm switched course a few times, before resuming its original northwestward motion by September 7. As the cyclone approached the Northeastern United States, it slowly weakened, falling to tropical storm intensity by September 11. The system then turned southwestward and was last noted late the next day about 80 mi (130 km) east-northeast of Virginia Beach, Virginia. Chenoweth proposed that this storm moved in a similar trajectory to that shown in HURDAT through September 5, when it instead turned north-northwestward. The cyclone also became more intense, holding major hurricane status from then until September 7. Chenoweth's study also indicates that the system persisted until late on September 14, hours after making landfall near present-day Sandbridge, Virginia, as a tropical storm.

Barbados, Montserrat, and Saint Lucia reported heavy rains but little damage. However, torrential precipitation on Martinique flooded Lamentin and Rivière-Salée. Rough seas capsized a schooner and damaged two others. On Guadeloupe, floodwaters inundated Grande-Terre, carried away a few bridges, and damaged numerous roads. Several homes, plantations, and fences suffered damage on Barbuda. Crops and vessels on Saint Kitts were significantly impacted. The hurricane damaged many homes, plantations, and vessels in the Virgin Islands, particularly on Saint Thomas and Tortola. Winds of 48 mph (77 km/h) were measured on Puerto Rico. In North Carolina, the northern half of the coast experienced rough seas, including cutting a new inlet at Nags Head. Winds downed communication wires to Hatteras. Farther north, abnormally high tides and severe gales were reported from Virginia to New York. In the former, the cyclone flooded low-lying areas and wharves, ruined crops, carried away bridges, and toppled telegraph wires. A steamship was beached near Cape Henry, causing almost $12,000 in damage. In Delaware, rough seas washed away a telegraph station, damaged a marine hospital, and flooded a life-saving station 40 ft (12 m) above high-water at Lewes. Nearby, abnormally high tides forced 200 people to flee Hugheyville. Along the coast of Delaware, the hurricane wrecked or beached 31 vessels, leading to 40 fatalities. Severe damage occurred to crops and fruit trees in the Egg Harbor City area of New Jersey. A few cities in the Northeastern United States reported sustained tropical storm-force winds. Overall, the hurricane caused nearly $2.36 million in damage.

=== Hurricane Five ===
- Category 1 hurricane (SSHWS)
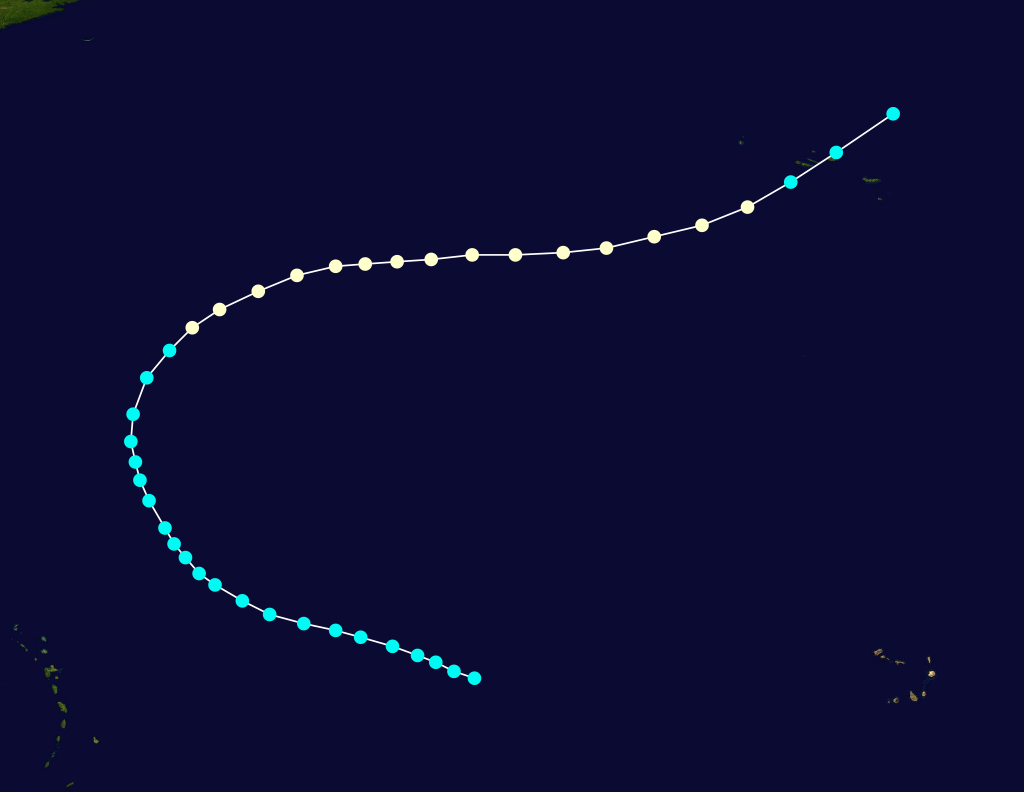
- Duration: September 2 – September 11
- Peak intensity: 80 mph (130 km/h) (1-min);

Meteorologist Charles J. Mitchell noted in 1924 that this system was first observed about halfway between the Cabo Verde Islands and the Lesser Antilles on September 2. The storm travelled to the northwest and increased in strength, reaching wind speeds of 60 mph (95 km/h) by September 4. The storm continued at that intensity on the same track for a further two days. The cyclones became a Category 1 hurricane as it gradually began curving northeastward on September 7, based on the Monthly Weather Review noting that ships reported a disturbance of "great violence". By September 8, the storm turned eastward and then to the northeast on September 10. Weakening to a tropical storm on September 11, the cyclone passed through the Azores and was last noted several hours later. The study by Chenoweth extended the storm's duration back to September 1. Later, Chenoweth also shifted the track to the west of the Azores and added an extratropical transition on September 10.

=== Hurricane Six ===
- Category 2 hurricane (SSHWS)
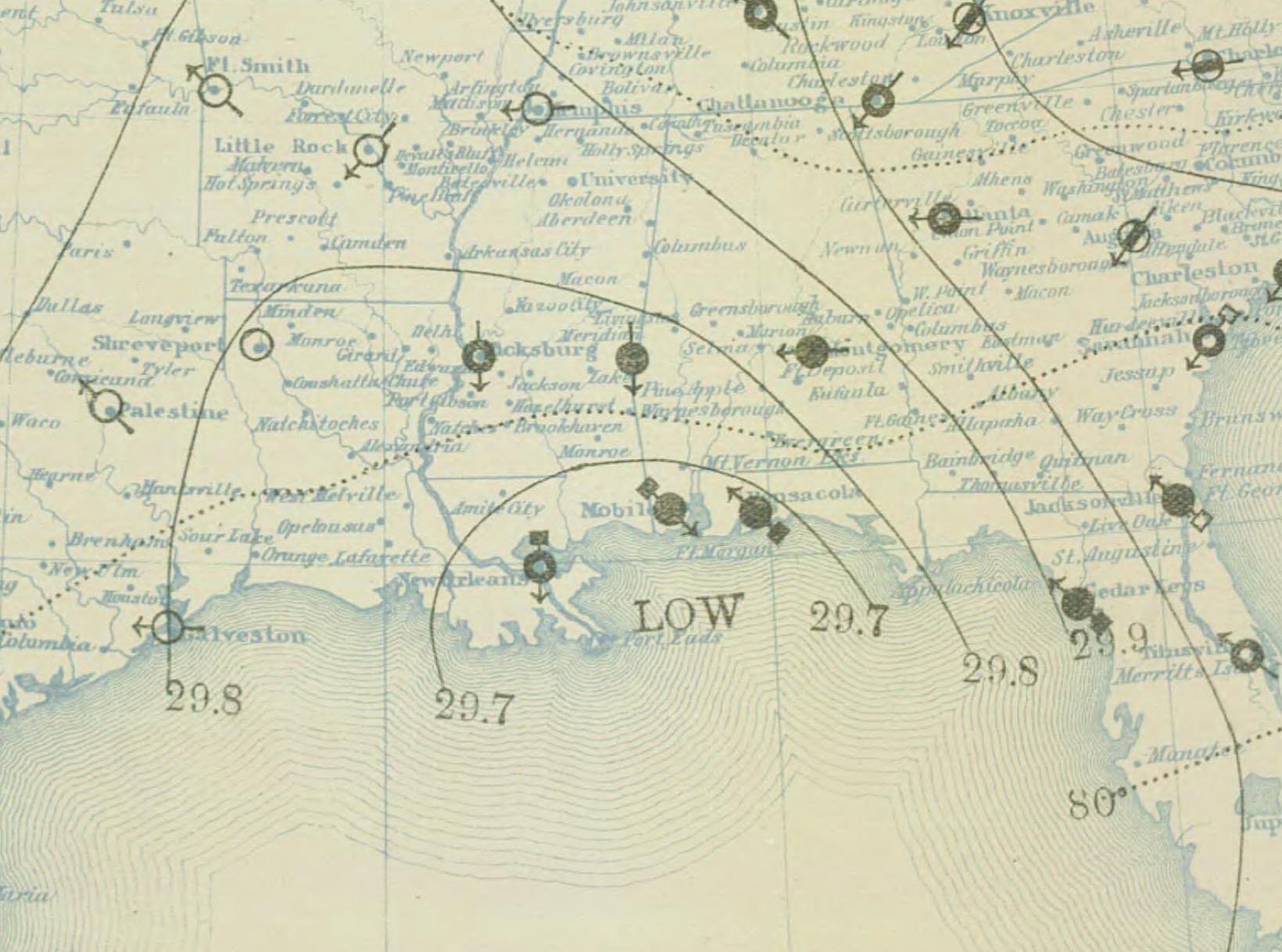
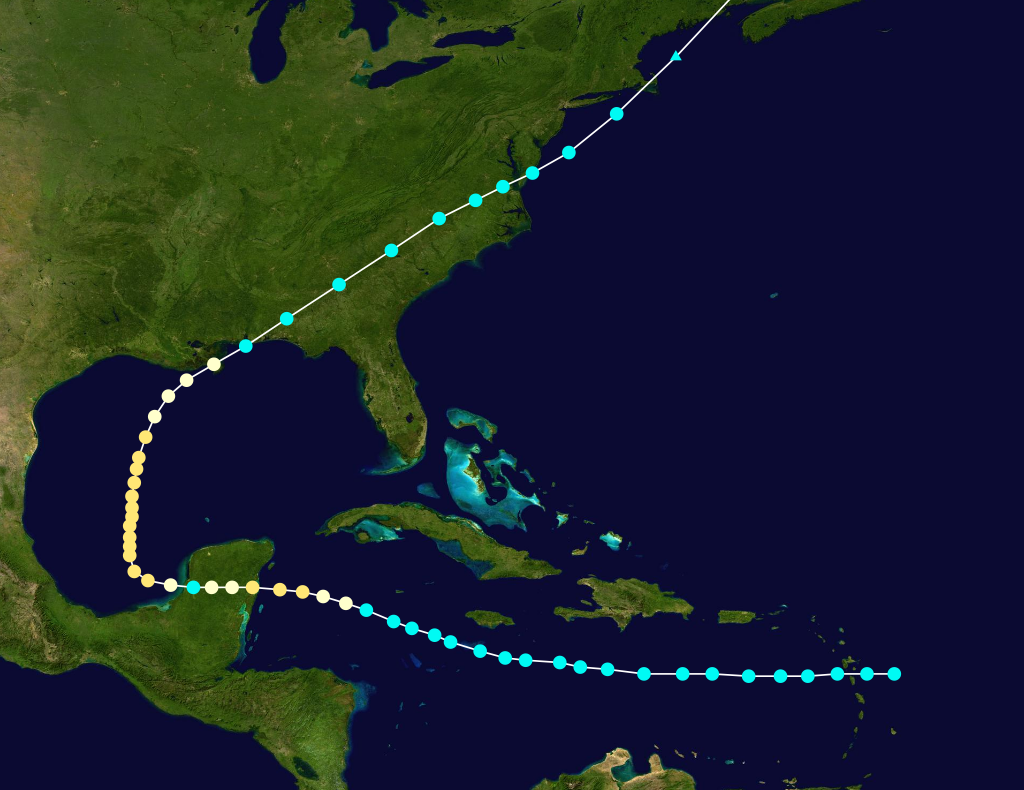
- Duration: September 12 – September 25
- Peak intensity: 110 mph (175 km/h) (1-min); 982 mbar (hPa)

Guadeloupe observed stormy conditions on September 12. Consequently, the track for this system begins just east of the Leeward Islands that day. After passing between Guadeloupe and Dominica later on September 12, the cyclone moved west-northwestward to westward across the Caribbean. By September 17, the storm intensified into a hurricane over the northwestward Caribbean, based on conditions reported by the steamer Mascotte. The system strengthened further, likely to a strong Category 2 hurricane with winds of 110 mph (175 km/h) prior striking Mexico near Felipe Carrillo Puerto, Quintana Roo, several hours later. Late on September 18, the storm emerged into the Gulf of Mexico near Campeche after weakening to a tropical storm. However, the cyclone quickly re-gained hurricane status and curved northward on September 19. The hurricane turned northeastward by September 22 and then made landfall near Buras, Louisiana, as a Category 1 hurricane with a barometric pressure of 982 mbar (29.0 inHg). Later on September 23, the system struck near Gulf Shores, Alabama, likely as a strong tropical storm. After crossing the Southeastern United States, the storm emerged into the Atlantic from the Delmarva Peninsula early on September 25 and crossed far eastern Massachusetts before becoming extratropical over the Gulf of Maine.

The 2014 study by Chenoweth proposed that this storm did not pass through the Lesser Antilles and instead formed on September 14 near La Blanquilla Island. More intensification occurred than shown in HURDAT, with the cyclone holding major hurricane status for about 18 hours. The storm also underwent extratropical transition earlier, on September 24 over North Carolina.

Only minor impacts occurred in the Lesser Antilles. Heavy rains overflowed a few rivers on Martinique, causing flooding at Les Anses-d'Arlet. However, this precipitation may have been as a result of a low-pressure area unrelated to the cyclone.In Mexico, the states of Campeche and Tabasco reported a few days of heavy rains, overflowing rivers, causing mudslides, and destroying some homes. Additionally, strong winds toppled trees and damaged crops, especially bananas and corn. Many of these trees fell onto dwellings, demolishing more than 100 and destroying some 250 others in Carmen. In Louisiana, the hurricane produced beneficial rainfall in the Buras area. Although the storm remained far south of Florida as it headed towards the Yucatán Peninsula, a few locations observed tropical storm-force wind gusts, including up to 60 mph (95 km/h) at Key West. Many communities across the northern portion of the state reported some damaged homes and downed trees, with damage totaling approximately $40,000 in the Jacksonville area alone. A tornado at Pablo Beach damaged or destroyed a few buildings near the Murray Hall hotel, damaged the hotel itself, and tossed a freight train car, buggy, horse, and boy, killing him after he struck the ground. Several locations across Georgia observed at least 1 in (25 mm) of rain, including 1.93 in (49 mm) in Smithville. Although the storm crossed the interior portions of North Carolina, wind gusts reached as high as 70 mph (110 km/h) along the coast, likely at Frying Pan Shoals. Some wind damage was reported over the western part of the state, mainly downed telegraph wires in Asheville and a hotel partially deroofed in Swannanoa.

=== Tropical Storm Seven ===
- Tropical storm (SSHWS)
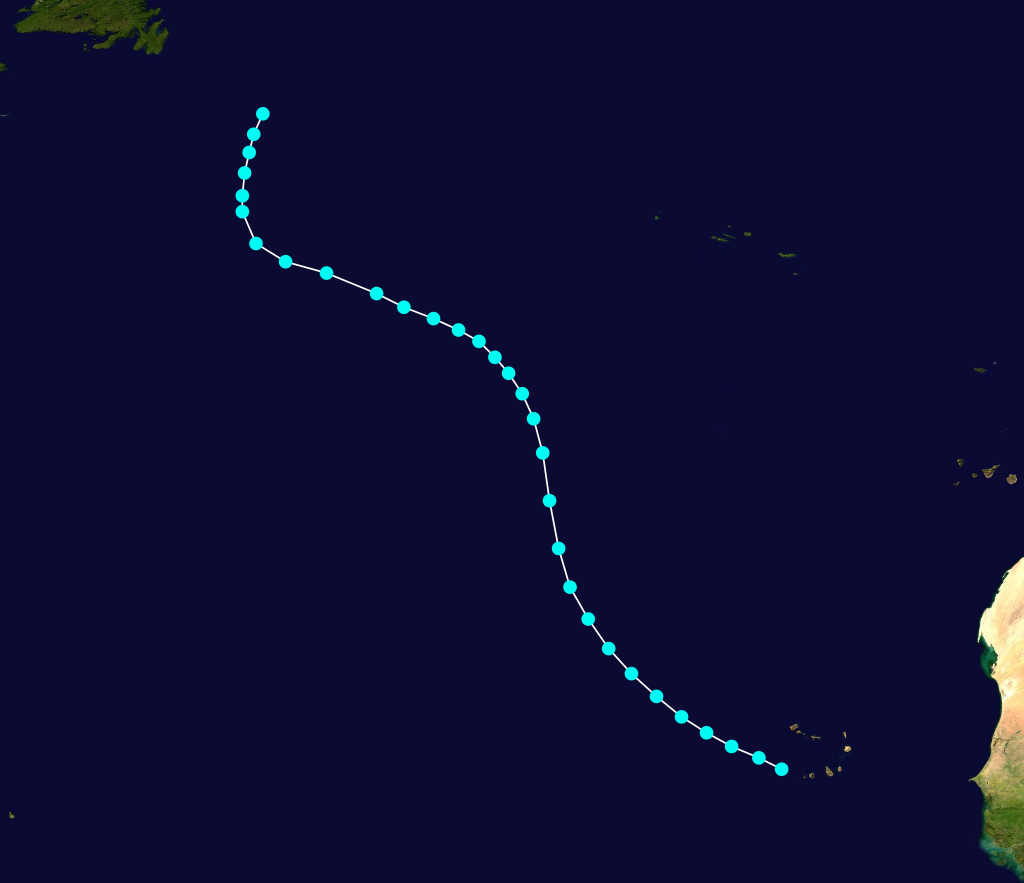
- Duration: September 12 – September 19
- Peak intensity: 60 mph (95 km/h) (1-min);

The 1924 report from Mitchell noted that this storm was first observed near the Cabo Verde Islands on September 12. Initially moving northwestward, the storm curved north-northwestward two days later, but then resumed a northwestward course by September 16. The cyclone is estimated to have peaked with winds of 60 mph (95 km/h). By September 18, the system turned north-northeastward and was last noted on the following day about 290 mi (465 km) southeast of Cape Race, Newfoundland. Chenoweth's study indicates that the cyclone developed as a tropical depression on September 14. An extratropical transition on September 19 has also been proposed.

=== Tropical Storm Eight ===
- Tropical storm (SSHWS)
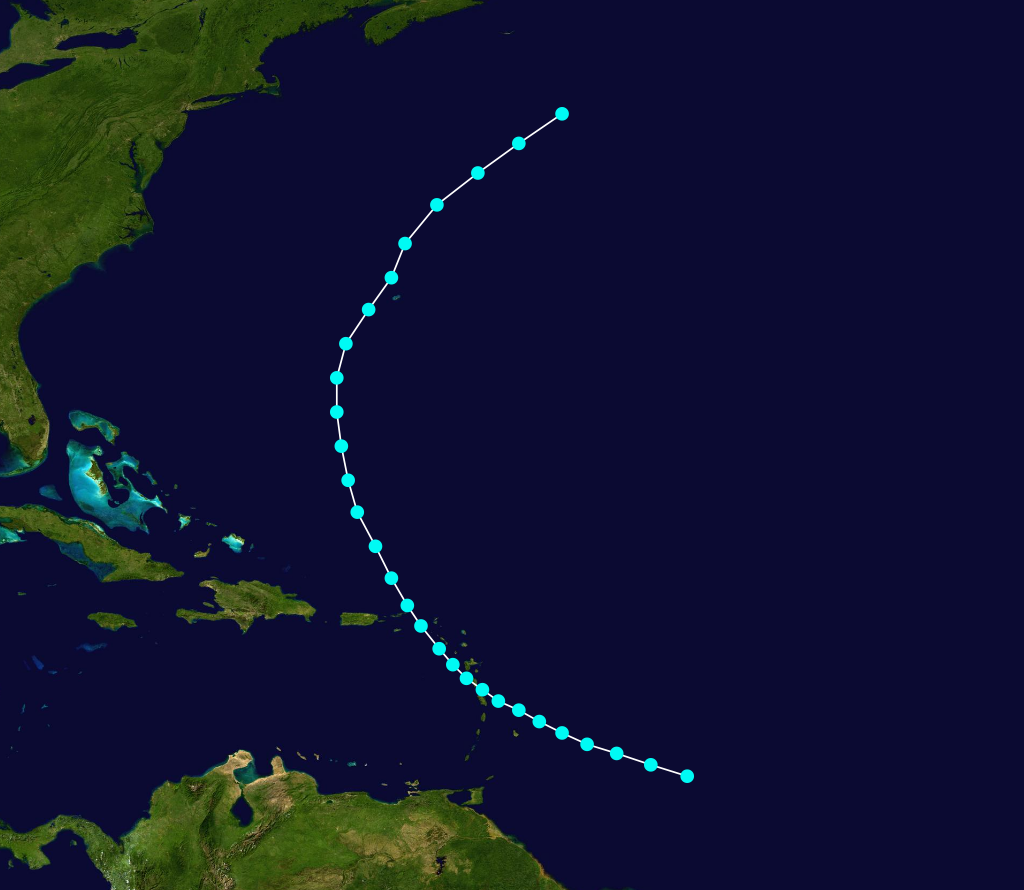
- Duration: September 29 – October 6
- Peak intensity: 70 mph (110 km/h) (1-min);

As meteorologist Ivan Ray Tannehill in 1938 documented this storm as far back as September 29, the official Atlantic hurricane database initiates the track on that date about 425 mi (685 km) northeast of Paramaribo, Suriname. Moving northeastward, the storm struck Dominica late on October 1 with winds estimated at 50 mph (85 km/h). The storm passed through the British Virgin Islands on the following day. After re-emerging into the Atlantic, the system curved north-northwestward on October 3 and then northeastward on October 4. As the cyclone neared Bermuda on October 5, it nearly became a hurricane, peaking with winds of 70 mph (110 km/h). On October 6, the storm was last noted approximately 270 mi (435 km) southeast of Sable Island, Nova Scotia.

The 2014 study by Chenoweth indicates that this cyclone on October 1 and did not cross the Lesser Antilles, instead moving remaining northeast of the islands. Chenoweth also proposed that further intensification occurred than shown in HURDAT, with the storm maintaining hurricane status from October 3 to October 5. Antigua experienced severe squalls and rough seas. The captain of a ship anchored at Parham reported winds reaching force 11 on the Beaufort scale, indicating near-hurricane conditions. On Bermuda, the storm capsized a few sloops and damaged a dinghy, unroofed one home, and downed some fences, trees, and telephone wires.

=== Tropical Storm Nine ===
- Tropical storm (SSHWS)
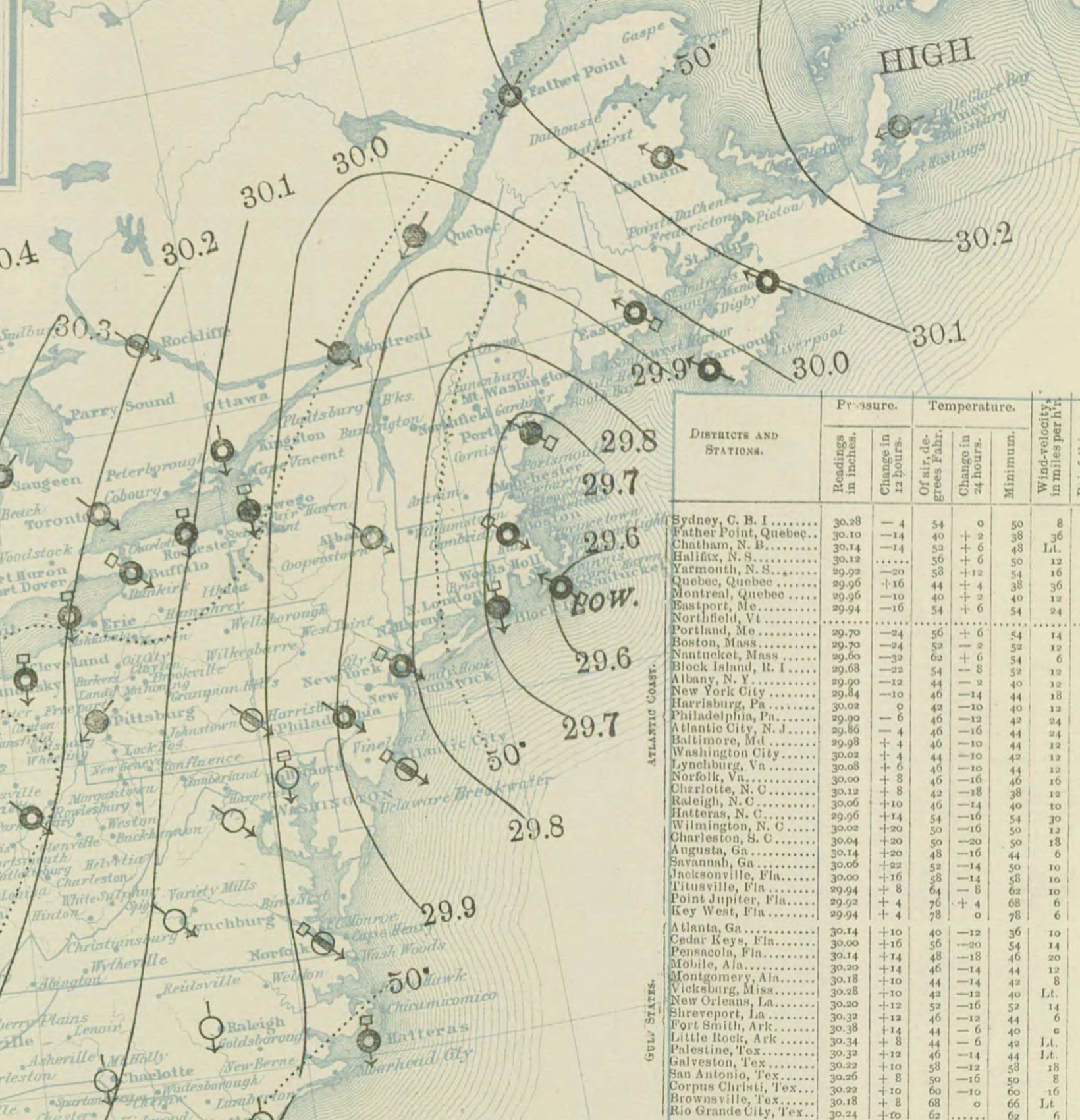
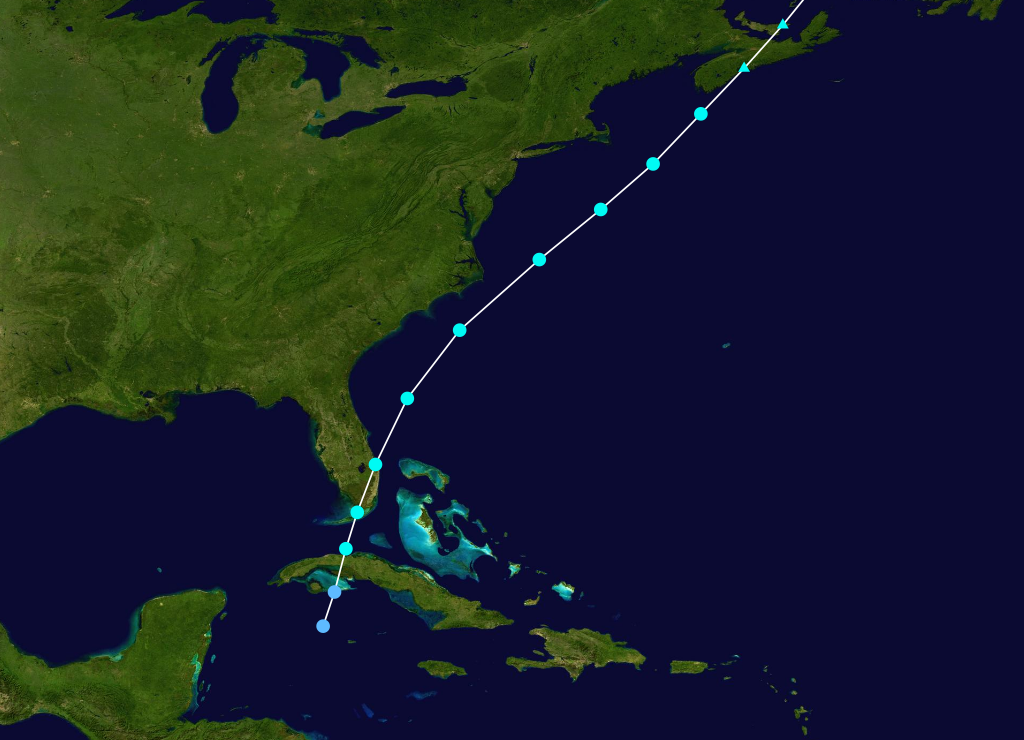
- Duration: October 5 – October 7
- Peak intensity: 60 mph (95 km/h) (1-min); ≤1002 mbar (hPa)

Although reports suggest the presence of a tropical depression over the northwestern Caribbean starting on October 4, the official track begins on the following day, when the existence of a closed circulation could be confirmed. Moving quickly northeastward, the depression struck the Zapata Swamp of Cuba and entered the Straits of Florida less than six hours later. Intensifying into a tropical storm late on October 5, the cyclone made landfall near Marathon, Florida, around 23:00 UTC. A second landfall occurred in Florida around 01:00 UTC the next day near Flamingo, about five hours before the storm emerged into the Atlantic near Stuart. Because ships recorded barometric pressure as low as 1,002 mbar (29.6 inHg) on October 7, the storm is estimated to have peaked with winds of 60 mph (95 km/h). The system transitioned into an extratropical cyclone later that day, just prior to striking near Northwest Cove, Nova Scotia. After crossing Nova Scotia, the extratropical remnants turned northward over the Gulf of Saint Lawrence, crossing far eastern Canada before dissipating over the Labrador Sea on October 11. Chenoweth also proposed the removal of this storm from HURDAT, finding "No evidence in land-based reports or from ships".

=== Other storms ===
Chenoweth proposed four other storms not currently listed in HURDAT. The first such system existed in the northwestern Gulf of Mexico by August 8. Moving generally west-northwestward, the system struck Texas as tropical storm near Crystal Beach on the following day and dissipated several hours later. On September 8, the next proposed new system formed over the central Atlantic. The storm crossed through the Azores before becoming extratropical on September 11. Chenoweth proposed that about a month later, another system formed on October 8 over the Atlantic well east of the Lesser Antilles. The storm moved northwestward through October 12 and then continued northward until transitioning into an extratropical cyclone on October 16. A fourth and final proposed new storm formed over the Caribbean near Honduras on October 15. The cyclone trekked northwestward through October 19, at which time it curved in a generally westward direction. Early on October 20, the system struck British Honduras (present-day Belize) at Ambergris Caye and southern Corozal District, before dissipating several hours later.

== Season effects ==
This is a table of all of the known storms that have formed in the 1889 Atlantic hurricane season. It includes their duration, landfall, damages, and death totals. Deaths in parentheses are additional and indirect (an example of an indirect death would be a traffic accident), but were still related to that storm. Damage and deaths include totals while the storm was extratropical, a wave, or a low, and all of the damage figures are in 1889 USD.

Saffir–Simpson scale
TD	TS	C1	C2	C3	C4	C5

1889 North Atlantic tropical cyclone season statistics
Storm name	Dates active	Storm category at peak intensity	Max 1-min wind mph (km/h)	Min. press. (mbar)	Areas affected	Damage (US$)	Deaths	Ref(s).
One	May 16–21	Category 1 hurricane	80 (130)	≤1002	None	None	None	
Two	June 15–20	Category 1 hurricane	75 (120)	Unknown	Cuba (Pinar del Río Province), Southeastern United States (Florida)	Unknown	Unknown	
Three	August 19–28	Category 1 hurricane	80 (130)	≤996	Hispaniola (the Dominican Republic), Northeastern United States	Unknown	None	
Four	September 1–12	Category 2 hurricane	105 (165)	≤981	Lesser Antilles (Guadeloupe), Northeastern United States	>$2.36 million	40	
Five	September 2–11	Category 1 hurricane	80 (130)	Unknown	None	None	None	
Six	September 12–25	Category 2 hurricane	110 (175)	982	Lesser Antilles, Mexico (Quintana Roo), Southeastern United States (Louisiana and Alabama)	>$40,000	1	
Seven	September 12–19	Tropical storm	60 (95)	Unknown	None	None	None	
Eight	September 29 – October 6	Tropical storm	70 (110)	Unknown	Lesser Antilles (Dominica and British Virgin Islands), Bermuda	Unknown	None	
Nine	October 5–7	Tropical storm	60 (95)	≤1002	Cuba, Florida, Atlantic Canada	Unknown	None	
Season aggregates
9 systems	May 16 – October 7		110 (175)	≤981		>$2.4 million	41	

== See also ==
- Atlantic hurricane reanalysis project
- Tropical cyclone observation
