= Margaret Hewitt =

Margaret Hewitt may refer to:

- Margaret Hewitt (suffragette) (1800s–1900s), British suffragette
- Margaret Hewitt (sociologist) (1928–1991), British sociologist, academic and churchwoman
- Maggie Hewitt, character of Against the Law (1997 film)

== See also ==
- Helen Margaret Hewitt (1900–1977), American musicologist and music educator
