= Robert Fowkes =

American linguist

Robert Allen Fowkes (April 7, 1913 – November 18, 1998) was an American linguist, specializing in Indo-European historical linguistics and philology.

Robert Fowkes was born in Harrison, New York. He received his B.A. in 1934 from New York University (NYU), with majors in German and Latin, and his M.A. from NYU a year later. He held a fellowship at the University of Bonn (1936–37). He received his Ph.D. in 1947 from Columbia University. Fowkes began teaching at NYU in 1938 as an instructor in German. He later became head of the German Department (1957–1968). He retired from NYU in 1978, but continued as Professor Emeritus, lecturing on Avestan, Old Irish, Gothic, Hittite, and other languages, until the 1990s. He also held a Guggenheim Fellowship in Welsh. During World War II he supervised technical research in German, Dutch, Danish, Swedish, Norwegian, French, Spanish, Portuguese, Russian, and Japanese. Later, at NYU he taught Yiddish, Gothic, Old Saxon, Frisian, Old Norse, Scandinavian, Sanskrit as well as German. He was visiting professor of Celtic languages at Columbia University in 1947.

His major book was Gothic Etymological Studies (1949). His articles appeared in the Journals WORD, Language, Germanic Review, Armenian Digest, and foreign Linguistics journals.

Fowkes was president of the Linguistic Circle of New York, where he was one of the first members, along with Roman Jakobson and Morris Swadesh. The Circle later became the International Linguistic Association (ILA). He was a member of the advisory board of American Speech. He wrote "Welsh Naming Practices, with a Comparative Look at the Cornish" in the journal Names, in 1981.

At the time of his death (he was struck by a car while crossing a street in Yonkers, New York) he was working on a 30-year-long project to compile the first etymological dictionary of Welsh. Robert Fowkes was given a Festschrift by WORD (April 1980). On October 14, 1978, ILA organized a colloquium in his honor. On April 25, 1999, NYU held a celebration in his memory.

== Main publications ==
- Gothic etymological studies. New York, 1949. New York University. Ottendorfer series of Germanic Monographs.
- The German lied and its poetry. (with Elaine Brody). New York, New York University Press, 1971.
- Celtic linguistics. 1976. International Linguistic Association. London
- Germanic Etymologies. 1945. The Journal of English and Germanic Philology, XLVI.
