= Jeannette Mirsky =

American writer (1903–1987)

Jeannette M Ginsburg
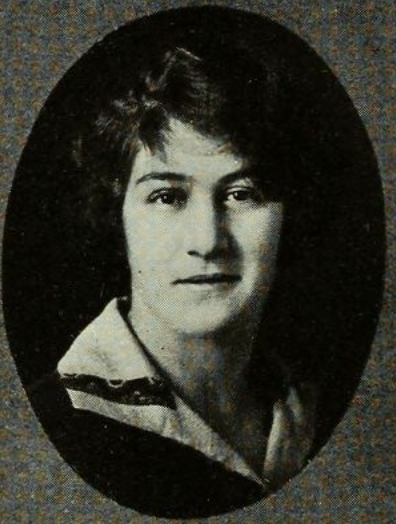
- Jeannette Mirsky, from the 1924 yearbook of Barnard College
- Born: September 3, 1903; Bradley Beach, New Jersey
- Died: March 10, 1987 (aged 83); Princeton, New Jersey
- Other names: Jeanette Mirsky
- Occupation: Author

Jeannette Mirsky Ginsburg (September 3, 1903 – March 10, 1987) was an American writer who was awarded a Guggenheim Fellowship in 1947 for her biographical writings on the history of exploration.

== Early life and education ==
Jeannette R. Mirsky was born in Bradley Beach, New Jersey and raised in New York City, the daughter of Michael David Mirsky and Frieda Ettleson Mirsky. Her father was in the garment business. Her brother was Alfred Mirsky (1900–1974), a cell biologist involved in the discovery of DNA. She was a student at the Ethical Culture School, class of 1921. She attended Barnard College, graduating in 1924. She did graduate work in anthropology at Columbia University with Franz Boas and Margaret Mead. She was later awarded an honorary doctorate from Columbia University.

She moved to Princeton, New Jersey in 1950.

== Career ==
Mirsky traveled extensively to access rare papers, maps, and artifacts related to her research. She won a Guggenheim Fellowship in 1947, as well as a Rockefeller Foundation grant and a grant from the National Endowment for the Humanities. She wrote the entry on "Polar Exploration" for the Encyclopedia Americana (1956). Because of her interest in the far north, she was invited to give the keynote lecture at Alaska's Festival of the Arts in 1966.

== Works by Jeannette Mirsky ==
- To the North: The Story of Arctic Exploration from the Earliest Times to the Present (1934; later republished as To the Arctic!)
- Elisha Kent Kane and the Seafaring Frontier
- The Westward Crossings (Balboa, Mackenzie, Lewis & Clark) (US ed. 1946; UK ed. 1951)
- Balboa: Discoverer of the Pacific (1964)
- Houses of God (1966)
- The Gentle Conquistadors (1972)
- Sir Aurel Stein, Archaeological Explorer (1977)
- The World of Eli Whitney (with Allan Nevins)
- The Great Chinese Travelers: An Anthology (1974, edited and wrote introduction)

== Personal life ==
Jeannette Mirsky married engineer Edward Bellamy Ginsburg in 1941. The couple moved to South Carolina for Edward's work, and then to Princeton, New Jersey in 1950. She was widowed in 1959, and died in 1987, at age 83, in Princeton. Her papers are archived at Barnard College.
