= Jesús Emilio Ramírez =

Colombian geophysicist (1904–1981)

Jesús Emilio Ramírez González
- Born: 1904; Yolombó, Antioquia, Colombia
- Died: 1981 (aged 76–77)
- Education: Saint Louis University
- Known for: Development of seismograph system for tracking Pacific Ocean storms
- Scientific career
- Fields: Geophysics, Seismology
- Workplaces: Geophysical Institute of the Colombian Andes
- Doctoral advisor: James B. Macelwane

Jesús Emilio Ramírez González (1904–1981) was a Colombian geophysicist and seismologist. Born in Yolombó, Antioquia, he earned a M.S. (1931) and PhD (1939) at Saint Louis University under James B. Macelwane. In the late 1930, he and Macelwane invented a system with that was able to track storms out in the middle of the Pacific Ocean using seismographs. He was able to show that "microseisms were traveling, rather than standing waves and that their origins could be traced to storms at sea". With Spanish meteorologist Simón Sarasola he co-founded the Geophysical Institute of the Colombian Andes and was its director for 38 years. He was a president of the Academia Colombiana de Ciencias Exactas and the Centro Regional de Sismologia de America del Sur (CERESIS) The Jesús Emilio Ramírez González Planetarium of Medellín is named for him.
