= Julius Goebel, Jr. =

American legal historian

- Born: Julius Ludwig Goebel, Jr. December 3, 1892; Menlo Park, California, U.S.
- Died: August 4, 1973 (aged 80)
- Spouse: Dorothy Goebel

Academic background
- Education: University of Illinois (BA, MA); Columbia University (PhD, LLB)

Academic work
- Discipline: Legal history
- Institutions: Columbia University School of Law

Julius Ludwig Goebel, Jr. (December 3, 1892 – August 4, 1973) was an American legal historian who taught at the Columbia University School of Law from 1925 until his retirement in 1961.

== Biography ==
Goebel was born on December 3, 1892, in Menlo Park, California, son of Julius Ludwig Goebel Senior, a professor of German at Stanford University and the University of Illinois at Urbana-Champaign. He attended the University of Illinois, from which he received an A.B. degree in 1912 and a M.A. degree in 1913. He then enrolled at Columbia University, where he became a University Fellow and earned his Ph.D. in 1915, followed by his LL.B. in 1923. In 1938, he was named George Welwood Murray Professor of Legal History at Columbia, and he remained in this position until his retirement in 1961. In 1970, he received the Order of May from the government of Argentina for his book The Struggle for the Falkland Islands. He died on August 4, 1973, after a long illness.
