= Jeanne Varney Pleasants =

French-born phonetician (1898–1986)

- Born: 24 June 1898; Évian-les-Bains, Haute-Savoie, France
- Died: 16 February 1986 (aged 87); Memphis, Tennessee, U.S.
- Occupations: Phonetician; educator
- Spouse: Charles Edward Varney (m. 1921; div. 1946) Samuel A. Pleasants (m. 1948; died 1973)
- Awards: Guggenheim Fellowship (1947)

Academic background
- Education: University of Paris; University of California

Academic work
- Sub-discipline: French-language phonetics
- Institutions: Laboratoire de Phonétique et Phonologie; Institut de Phonétique de Grenoble; Barnard College

Jeanne Varney Pleasants (24 June 1898 – 16 February 1986) was a French-born phonetician and educator. She spent several decades working at Columbia University and Barnard College, where she was a professor of French and started the institutions' first language labs. She was a 1947 Guggenheim Fellow and published the book Etudes sur l'E Muet in 1956.

== Biography ==
Jeanne Vidon was born to Maria (née De Croux) and Ferdinand Vidon on 24 June 1898 in Évian-les-Bains, a small town in the department of Haute-Savoie. She studied at the University of Paris, where she obtained a teachers' degree in 1923 and a PhD in comparative linguistics in 1933. She briefly studied in the United States, where she obtained her BA from the University of California in 1926.

Back in France, she taught at the Laboratoire de Phonétique et Phonologie (1927–1933).), as well as at the Institut de Phonétique de Grenoble. In 1933, she started working at Barnard College as a lecturer. She was later promoted to assistant professor in 1938 and associate professor in 1948. In 1947, she was awarded a Guggenheim Fellowship. In 1958, she was promoted to full professor, and in 1969, she was promoted to professor emerita of French. In addition to Columbia, she also worked as a professor at the École libre des hautes études, starting in 1942.

In 1954, she started the first language labs at Columbia University, including at Barnard. In 1956, Barnard College's foreign language studio was inaugurated in her honor. In 1958, she became director of another new language lab at Columbia, with pronunciation practice running on staff-made audio tapes. Michael Riffaterre, who was a doctoral student and later professor at Columbia, once worked with her on poetry recordings. She also worked as a language lab development consultant in other educational institutions. The Modern Language Journal called her "a pioneer in the use of recording equipment in foreign language study".

She also supported using literature for language education, particularly pronunciation, instead of the audio-lingual method, and she once devised a high school-level curriculum on the Comédie-Française theatre. In 1961, she was involved in the foundation of the journal Teaching Language Through Literature, as one of the editors. She also became vice-president of the New York State Federation of Foreign Language Teachers in 1956 and later president of the American Association of Teachers of French in 1958.

In addition to language education, she also wrote about phonetics. Her book Etudes sur l'E Muet, about the e muet in French pronunciation, was published in 1956. Among her education-oriented works include a French education textbook named Pronunciation in French. Additionally, she was an editorial board member for The French Review and Word.

She was twice married: to Charles Edward Varney from 1921 until their divorce in 1946, and to Samuel A. Pleasants from 1948 until his death in 1973. She had one son. Pleasants died on 16 February 1986, aged 87, at Memphis, Tennessee, where she lived at the time.
