= Dorothy Goebel =

American historian

Dorothy Burne Goebel
- Born: 24 August 1898; Huntington, New York
- Died: 12 March 1976 (aged 77); Huntington, New York
- Education: Barnard College (A.B.); Columbia University (M.A., Ph.D)
- Occupation: Historian
- Spouse: Julius Goebel, Jr.

Dorothy Goebel (24 August 1898 – 12 March 1976) was an American historian of the United States.

== Biography ==
Dorothy Burne Goebel was born in Huntington, New York, on 24 August 1898. She was a member of Phi Beta Kappa at Barnard College where she received her A.B. in 1920. Two years later she earned her M.A. from Columbia University and received her Ph.D. in 1926 from the same institution while serving as an assistant and lecturer at Barnard. That same year Goebel became an instructor at Hunter College in New York City. She was promoted to professor and served as chairman of the department from 1942 to 1948 and from 1961 to 1962, before retiring in 1963. Goebel died on 12 March 1976 in her home town.

By herself, Goebel published William Henry Harrison in 1926 and American Foreign Policy: The Documentary Record, 1776–1960 in 1961. She frequently collaborated with her husband, the legal historian Julius Goebel, Jr., assisting him with the research for his 1928 book, Some Legal and Political Aspects of the Manors of New York. Together they wrote Generals in the White House in 1945, giving an account of nine generals who went on to become U.S. Presidents. Goebel became associate editor of The Law Practice of Alexander Hamilton: Documents and Commentary in 1963, which was edited by her husband.

== Sources ==
- Scanlon, Jennifer; Cosner, Shaaron (1996). American Women Historians, 1700s–1990s: A Biographical Dictionary. Westport, Connecticut: Greenwood Press. ISBN 0-313-29664-2.
