= René Honorato Cienfuegos =

Chilean doctor, researcher, and professor

René Honorato Cienfuegos was a Chilean doctor and researcher, professor of Experimental Medicine at the University of Chile. He was a recipient of the Guggenheim Grant in 1946.
