= Laurence Stapleton (academic) =

American academic (1911–1998)

- Born: November 20, 1911; Holyoke, Massachusetts, U.S.
- Died: April 6, 1998 (aged 86); Bryn Mawr, Pennsylvania, U.S.
- Education: Smith College (BA)
- Occupation: Writer
- Writing career
- Genres: Political philosophy; literary studies
- Notable awards: Guggenheim Fellowship (1947)

Katharine Laurence Stapleton (November 20, 1911 – April 6, 1998) was an American academic. A 1947 Guggenheim Fellow, she wrote several books on literature and politics, including Justice and World Society (1944), The Design of Democracy (1949), and The Elected Circle (1973). She taught at Bryn Mawr College for almost five decades, becoming Mary E. Garrett Alumnae Professor of English.

== Biography ==
Katharine Laurence Stapleton was born on November 20, 1911, in Holyoke, Massachusetts; her parents were Frances (née Purtill) and Richard Prout Stapleton. She attended Smith College, where she obtained a BA in 1932, and the University of London, where she obtained a research certificate in 1933.

After working as a registrar at the Massachusetts Public Employment Service from 1933, Stapleton became an English instructor at Bryn Mawr College in 1934. She was promoted to assistant professor in 1938, associate professor in 1942, and full professor in 1948. Subjects she taught at Bryn Mawr included creative writing, literary criticism, poetry, and political science. She chaired Bryn Mawr's Department of English from 1954 to 1965, and served as Mary E. Garrett Alumnae Professor of English. In 1980, she retired from Bryn Mawr.

Stapleton was a published author, with six titles in fields such as criticism, poetry, and political science. In 1944, she authored a political philosophy book named Justice and World Society. In 1947, she was awarded a Guggenheim Fellowship for "the preparation of a book on democracy, with the purpose of restating the general ideas on which democracy depends and of describing the setting and atmosphere of democracy today as they appear to a private citizen". based on the Fellowship, her next book, The Design of Democracy, was published by Oxford University Press on November 3, 1949.

Stapleton was editor for the 1960 book H. D. Thoreau: A Writer's Journal; Marty Brewster of English Journal noted that the volume was "not like cheap chocolate to be chomped and swallowed [but rather] bittersweet European chocolate to rest on the tongue and dissolve leisurely". She was a 1972 National Endowment for the Arts Literature Fellow in Creative Writing. She also wrote The Elected Circle (1973), a literary book dissecting the concept of prose through the work of eight individual writers, and Marianne Moore: The Poet's Advance (1979), a literary study of the titular writer's poetry.

Stapleton died on April 6, 1998, from respiratory failure at her Bryn Mawr, Pennsylvania, home. She was 86.

== Works ==
- Justice and World Society (1944)
- The Design of Democracy (1949)
- (as editor) H. D. Thoreau: A Writer's Journal (1960)
- The Elected Circle: Studies in the Art of Prose (1973)
- Marianne Moore: The Poet's Advance (1979)
