= John Verrall =

John Verrall may refer to:

- John Verrall (composer)
- John Verrall (politician)
