= International Linguistic Association =

American linguistics organization

The International Linguistic Association (ILA) is an American linguistics organization, originally founded in 1943 as the Linguistic Circle of New York. Its founding members were academic linguists in the New York area, including many members of the École Libre des Hautes Études in exile. The model for the new organization was the Société de Linguistique de Paris. Early members included Roman Jakobson, Morris Swadesh, André Martinet, Henri F. Muller, Giuliano Bonfante, Robert Austerlitz, Robert Fowkes, Henry Lee Smith, Wolf Leslau, and Louis H. Gray.

The Circle began publishing the journal WORD in 1945 under the editorship of Pauline Taylor. Both the Circle and the journal soon became known as one of the main sources of new ideas in American linguistics before the Chomsky era.

In 1969, the society's name was changed to International Linguistic Association, as an acknowledgment of the fact that its membership now extended far beyond New York City.

The ILA holds an annual meeting every April (usually in New York) and sponsors individual talks on six Saturdays during the academic year. WORD is now under the editorship of Jonathan J. Webster of the City University of Hong Kong; since 2015, the journal has been published by Routledge/Taylor&Francis.
