= Planetarium of Medellín =

Coordinates: 6°16′06″N 75°33′58″W

- Planetario de Jesús Emilio Ramírez González
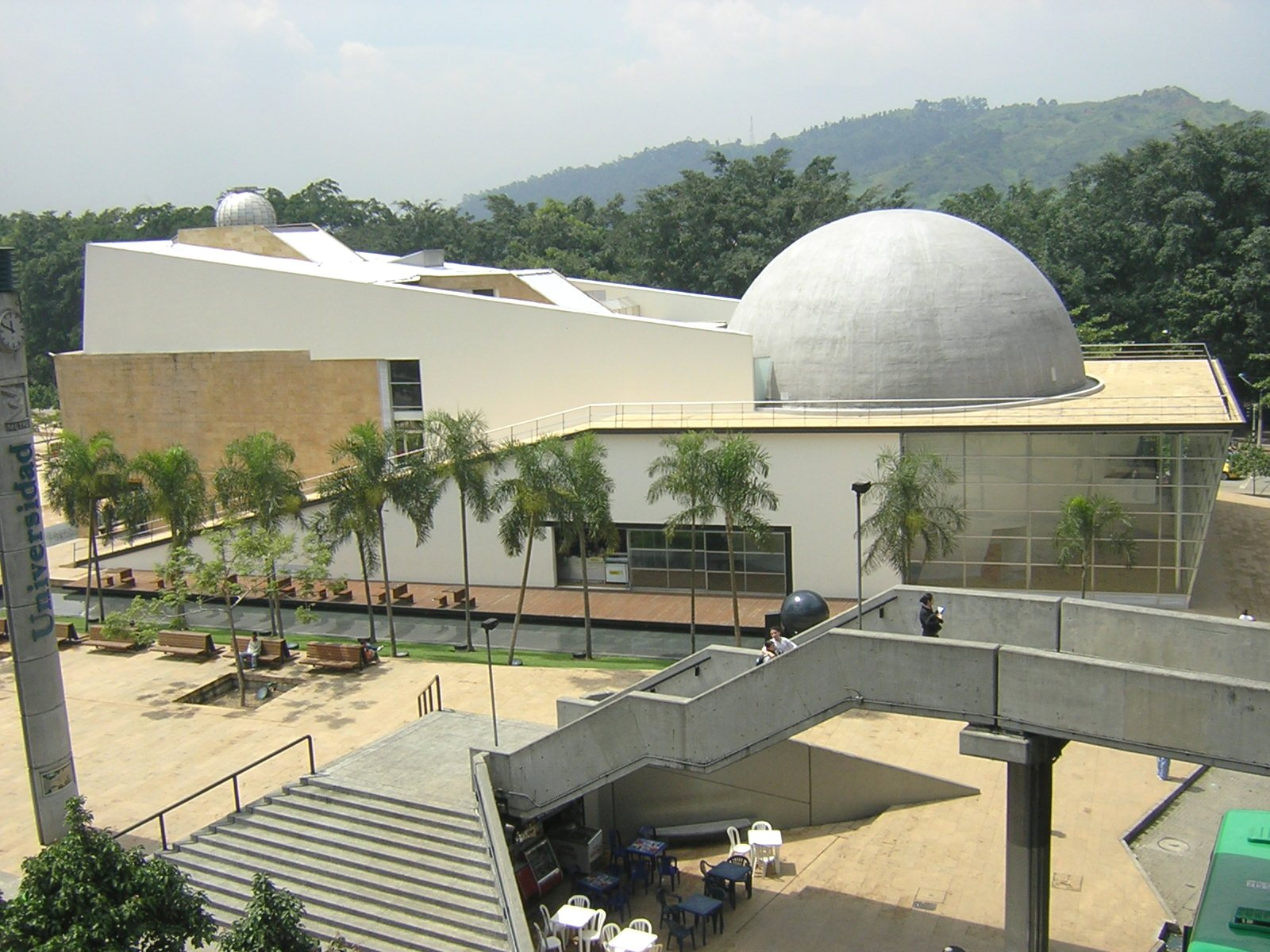
- Established: 1984
- Location: Medellín, Colombia
- Type: Science museum, Planetarium
- Website: http://www.planetariomedellin.org/

The Jesús Emilio Ramírez González Planetarium of Medellín (Spanish: Planetario Medellín de Jesús Emilio Ramírez González) is a planetarium located in Medellín, Colombia and established on October 10, 1984. It was originally conceived by the Astronomical Society of the College of San José, led at that time by Brother Daniel (Julián González Patiño), a renowned scientist, astronomer, and botanist. The purpose is that the planetarium is a space for the promotion of scientific and technological culture of citizens and mentality that encourages scientific and technological creativity. The museum is surrounded by a public space known as the Park of Wishes, which was designed by Felipe Uribe de Bedout to coordinate with the planetarium.

Medellín was the first South American city to have a computer-controlled planetarium.

== History ==
The planetarium is named after Jess Emilio Ramírez González, a famous Colombian geophysicist. The planetarium is located in an area called the "North Zone" (Zona Norte), which is an urban sprawl area north of the city's center. The great socio-political instability of the 1980s and 1990s had an enormous effect on areas like these where people from different strata lived. Insecurity and vandalism drove the observatory, the Botanical Garden of Medellín, and even the University of Antioquia to consider relocation for a time. However, a series of urban interventions at the end of the 1990s—including a University stop on the Medellín Metro—prevented the closure of the three areas and helped to reconstitute the area.

== Renovations ==
It was renovated in 2006 and comprises the largest recreational area, science and technology city, in the North Zone. In its vicinity are located North Park, Parque Explora, the Park of Wishes and several major units of the University of Antioquia.

Since 2011, with support from the Mayor of Medellin, Bancolombia, and various astronomical communities of the city, Parque Explora developed a project to renovate the planetarium. The core of this transformation was a new scientific visualization center.

The first floor, open access for visitors, consists of an auditorium with capacity for 200 people, a library specializing in science literacy, and a store with items and souvenirs on astronomy and a café.

== Gallery ==
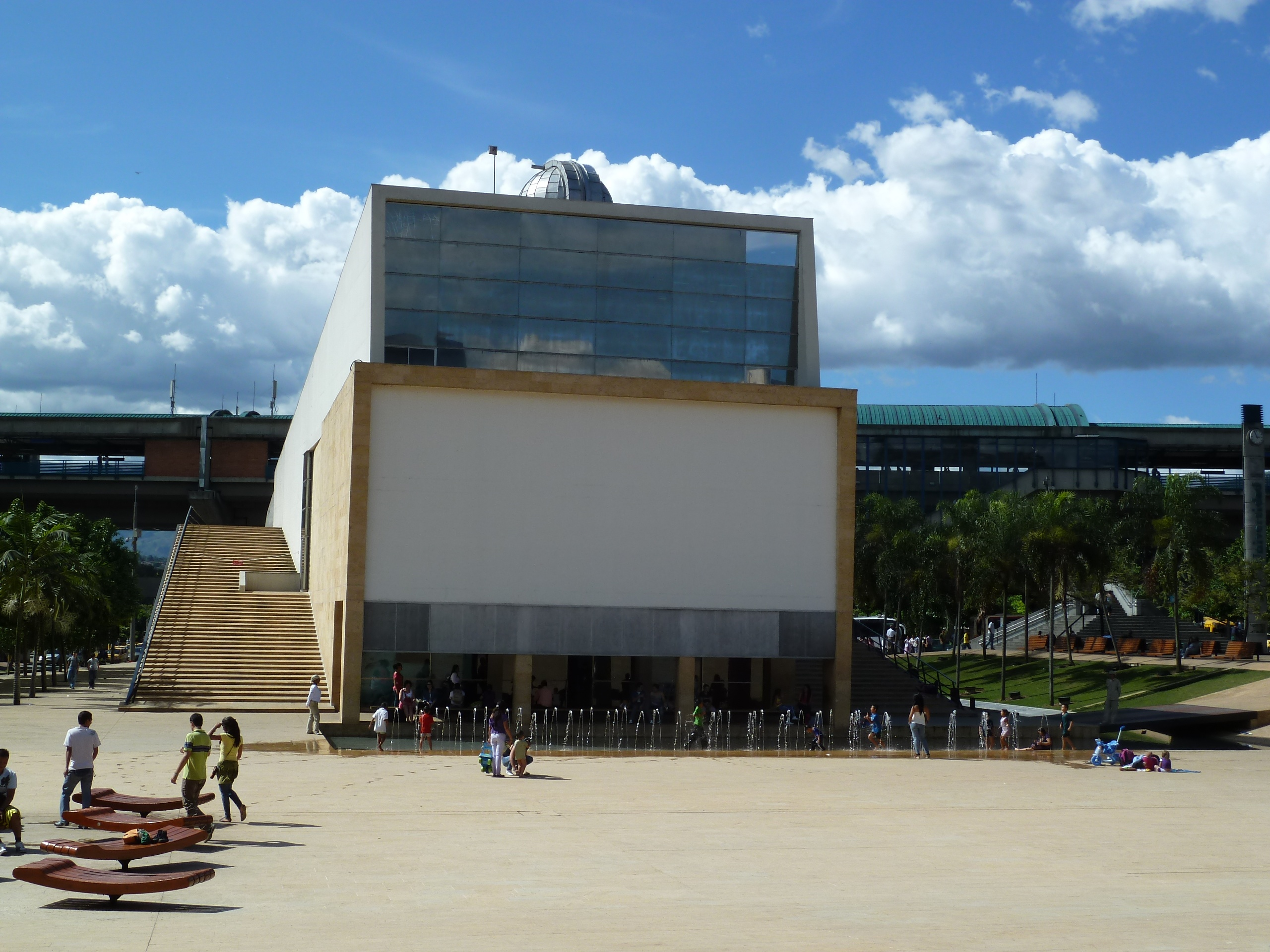
View of the planetarium from the Park of Wishes

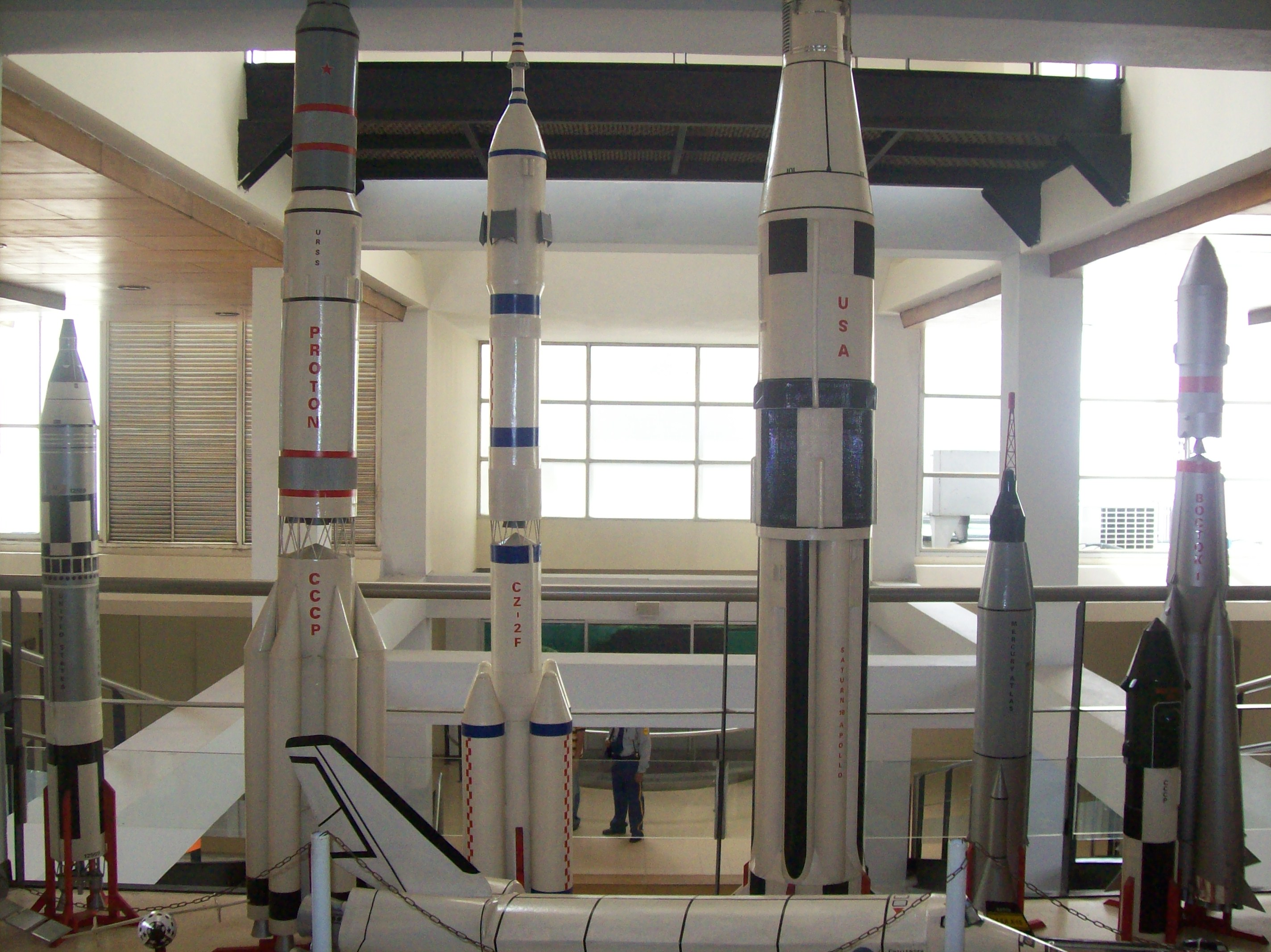
Rocket models displayed inside before its renewal on 2012

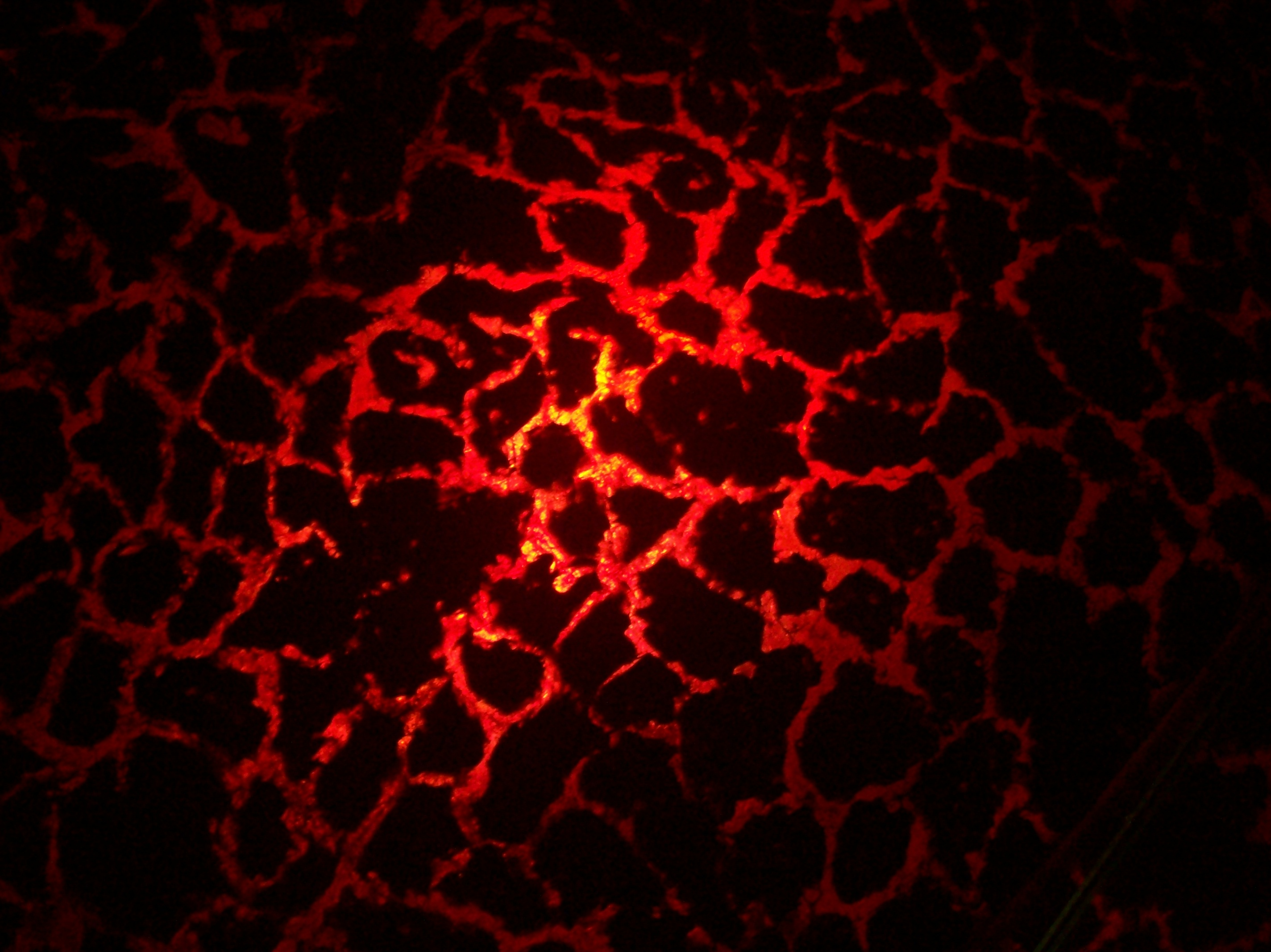
