= Helen Margaret Hewitt =

Musicologist and music educator

- Born: May 2, 1900; Granville, New York
- Died: March 19, 1977 (aged 76); Denton, Texas
- Occupation: Music educator
- Awards: Guggenheim Fellowship

Academic background
- Education: Vassar College, Columbia University, Harvard University

Academic work
- Discipline: Musicology
- Institutions: North Texas State Teachers College, Florida State College for Women, Hunter College

Helen Margaret Hewitt (May 2, 1900 – March 19, 1977) was an American musicologist and music educator, who received a Guggenheim Fellowship to study sacred music in Paris in 1947. She was best known for her scholarly editions of sixteenth-century Venetian music incunabula printed by Ottaviano Petrucci.

== Early life and education ==
Helen Margaret Hewitt was born in Granville, New York. She graduated from Vassar College in 1921, and from Eastman School of Music in 1925. She continued her studies in France, at the American Conservatory, where she worked with Charles-Marie Widor in organ performance, and Nadia Boulanger in harmony. She then studied at the Curtis Institute of Music in Philadelphia with Lynnwood Farnam (1928-1930) and then earned a master's degree at Union Theological Seminary in 1932, and another master's degree at Columbia University the following year. Hewitt completed doctoral studies at Harvard University in 1938. She was the first woman to earn a doctorate in music at Harvard.

== Career ==
Hewitt taught music at Potsdam, New York, at the Florida State College for Women, and at Hunter College, before joining the faculty at North Texas State Teachers College in 1942. She was a professor at North Texas until she retired in 1969, and helped to found the doctoral program in music during her tenure there. She and her students gave organ recitals at the campus's main auditorium.

As a scholar, she produced authoritative editions of sixteenth-century Venetian compositions, including the Harmonice Musices Odhecaton compiled and edited the publication Doctoral Dissertations in Musicology from 1952 to 1965, translated Bach scholarship from German, and was awarded a Guggenheim Fellowship in 1947. In 1972, she was the recipient of the Elizabeth Mathias Award from Mu Phi Epsilon. In 1968 she was given an honorary Doctor of Letters degree from Smith College.

== Personal life ==
Hewitt died in Denton, Texas in 1977, age 76. Her papers are now held by the music library at the University of North Texas College of Music. The Helen Hewitt Organ Scholarship Fund at North Texas was named in her memory.
