= Elixabete Sarasola =

Spanish footballer (born 1991)

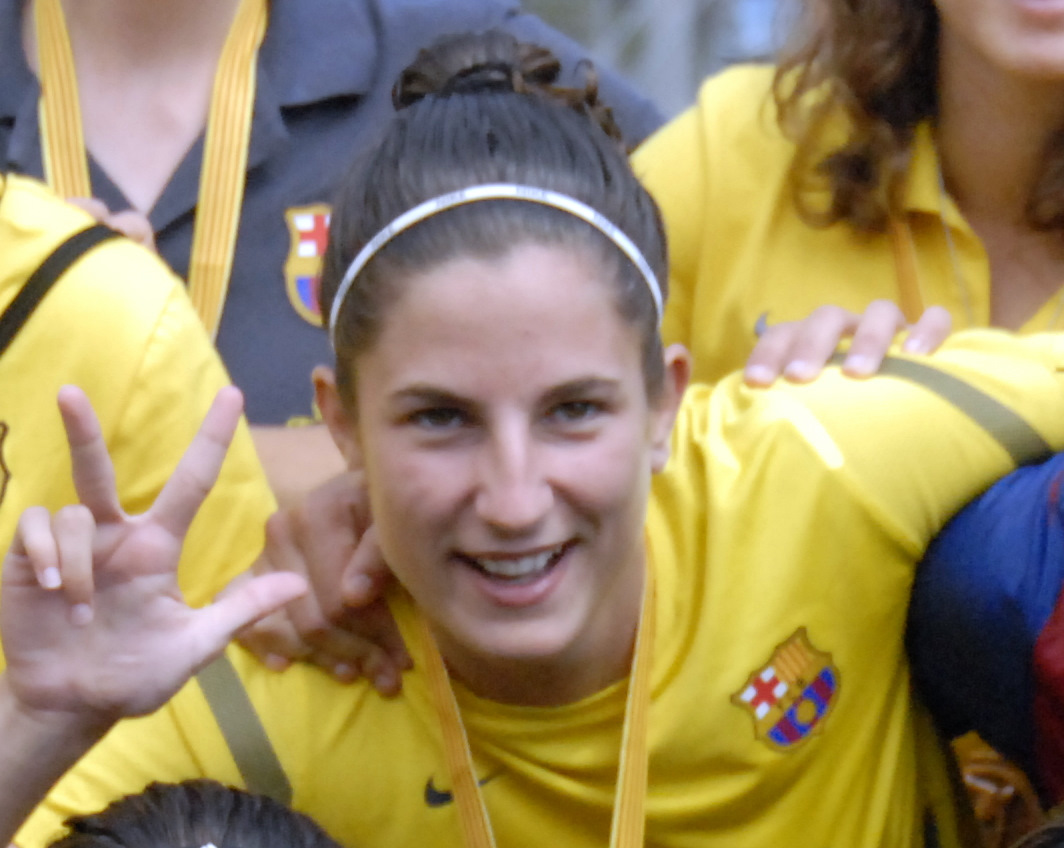
- Sarasola with Barcelona in 2011

Personal information
- Full name: Elixabete Sarasola Nieto
- Date of birth: 12 April 1991 (age 35)
- Place of birth: San Sebastián, Spain
- Height: 5 ft 7 in (1.70 m)
- Position: Goalkeeper

Youth career
- 2005–2007: Añorga KKE

College career
Years	Team	Apps	(Gls)
2012–2013	Charleston Cougars		

Senior career*
Years	Team	Apps	(Gls)
2007–2009	Real Sociedad	30	(0)
2009–2012	FC Barcelona		
2013	Colorado Rush Women		
2015–2018	AFC Ajax	52	(0)
2018–2020	PSV	28	(0)

International career
2008–2009	Spain under-19	7	(0)
2016	Basque Country	1	(0)
- * Club domestic league appearances and goals

Elixabete "Eli" Sarasola Nieto (born 12 April 1991) is a Spanish former footballer who last played as a goalkeeper for PSV of the Eredivisie Vrouwen.

Trained at university level in the United States, Sarasola played college soccer for three seasons for Charleston Cougars and later featured for USL W-League team Colorado Rush Women in 2013. Before moving to America she represented FC Barcelona in Spain's Primera División.
