= Word (journal) =

- Discipline: Linguistics
- Language: English
- Edited by: Johnathan Webster

Publication details
- Publisher: International Linguistic Association
- Frequency: Quarterly

Standard abbreviations
- ISO 4: Word

Indexing
- ISSN: 0043-7956
- OCLC no.: 1995240

Links
- Journal homepage

WORD is a triannual academic journal of linguistics published by the International Linguistic Association.
