= Simón Sarasola =

Spanish meteorologist and Jesuit priest

Simón Sarasola (1871–Dec/12/1947) was a Spanish meteorologist and Jesuit priest. He was president of the Belen Jesuit Preparatory School at Havana, and director of the National Meteorological Observatory. After the opening of Panama Canal (1914), he founded the Montserrat Observatory in Cienfuegos, southern Cuba. He moved to Bogotá (Colombia) in 1921, where participated in the creation of the weather observatory of Colegio Nacional de San Bartolomé in Bogotá and the reorganization of a national meteorological service. In 1923 established the first seismograph in Colombia. He co-founded the Geophysical Institute of the Colombian Andes with J. E. Ramírez in 1941.
