= Foxe's Book of Martyrs =

1563 work by English historian John Foxe

Actes and Monuments of these Latter and Perillous Days, Touching Matters of the Church
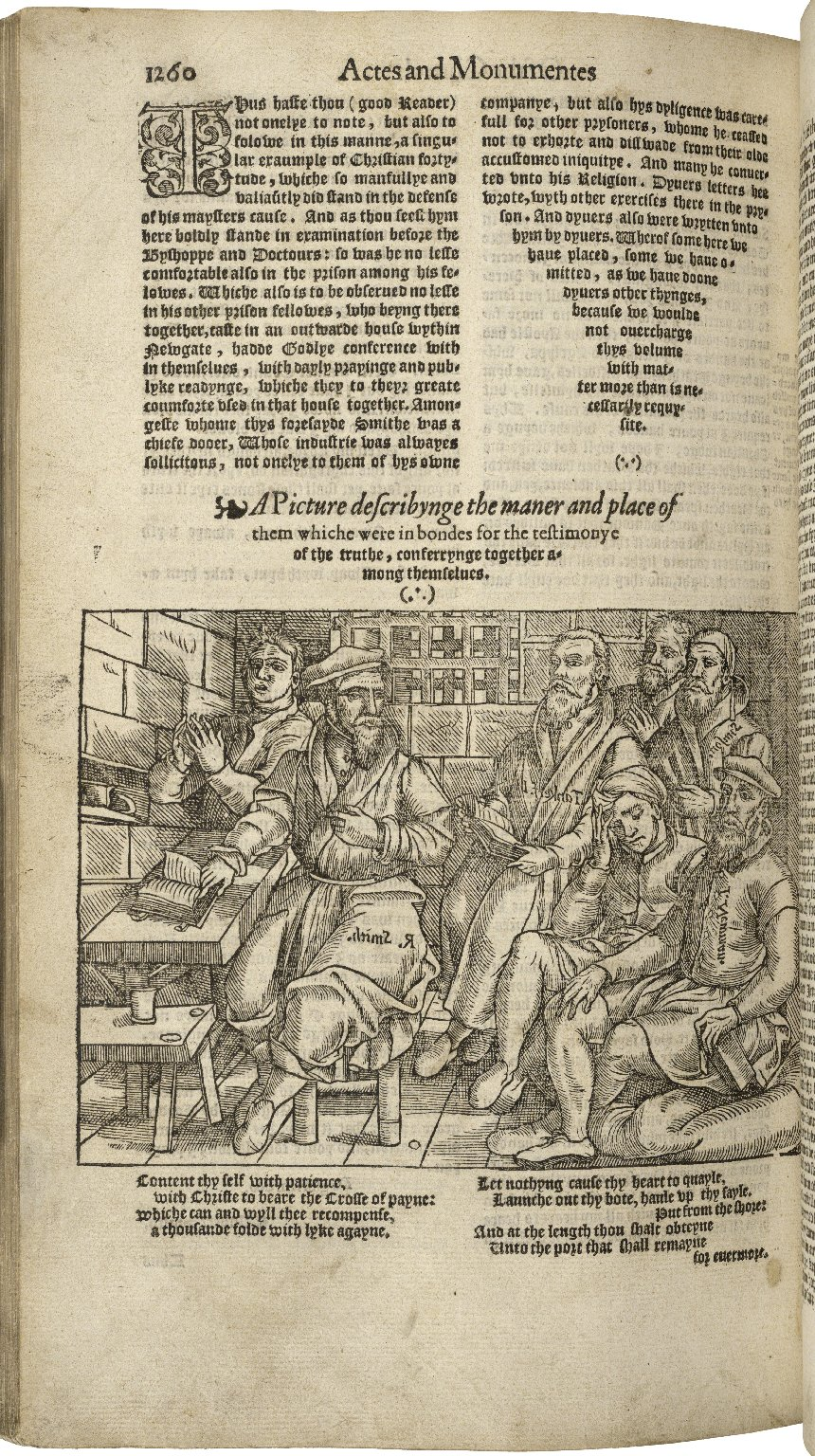
- A page of the first English-language edition, printed by John Day in 1563
- Author: John Foxe
- Language: Early Modern English
- Subject: Martyrology; history of Protestantism
- Publisher: John Day
- Publication date: 20 March 1563
- Publication place: England
- Media type: Print (folio)
- OCLC: 751705715
- Dewey Decimal: 272.6
- LC Class: BR1600 .F62
- Text: Actes and Monuments of these Latter and Perillous Days, Touching Matters of the Church at Wikisource

The Actes and Monuments (full title: Actes and Monuments of these Latter and Perillous Days, Touching Matters of the Church), popularly known as Foxe's Book of Martyrs, is a work of Protestant history and martyrology by Protestant English historian John Foxe, first published in 1563 by John Day.

It includes a polemical account of the sufferings of Protestants under the Catholic Church, with particular emphasis on England and Scotland. The book was highly influential in those countries and helped shape lasting popular notions of Catholicism there.

The book went through four editions in Foxe's lifetime and a number of later editions and abridgements, including some that specifically reduced the text to a Book of Martyrs.

== Background ==
After the Reformation, Catholic apologists raised the issue of the novelties of Protestant doctrines, as "exploiting religious credulity for material and sexual ends." (Note: According to historian S.J. Barnett "Catholic propagandists hoped to undermine the legitimacy of Protestantism by contrasting its evident novelty against the relative antiquity of Roman Catholicism. Implicit in the charge of novelty was the accusation that Protestantism represented only a counterfeit religion.) Protestant apologists such as Calvinist Anglican John Foxe "sought to establish the continuity of a proto-Protestant piety from apostolic times to the Reformation." (Note: "His message was clear: there had been a de facto succession of true (proto-Protestant) piety from the apostles to sixteenth-century English Protestants.")

== Bibliographic details ==
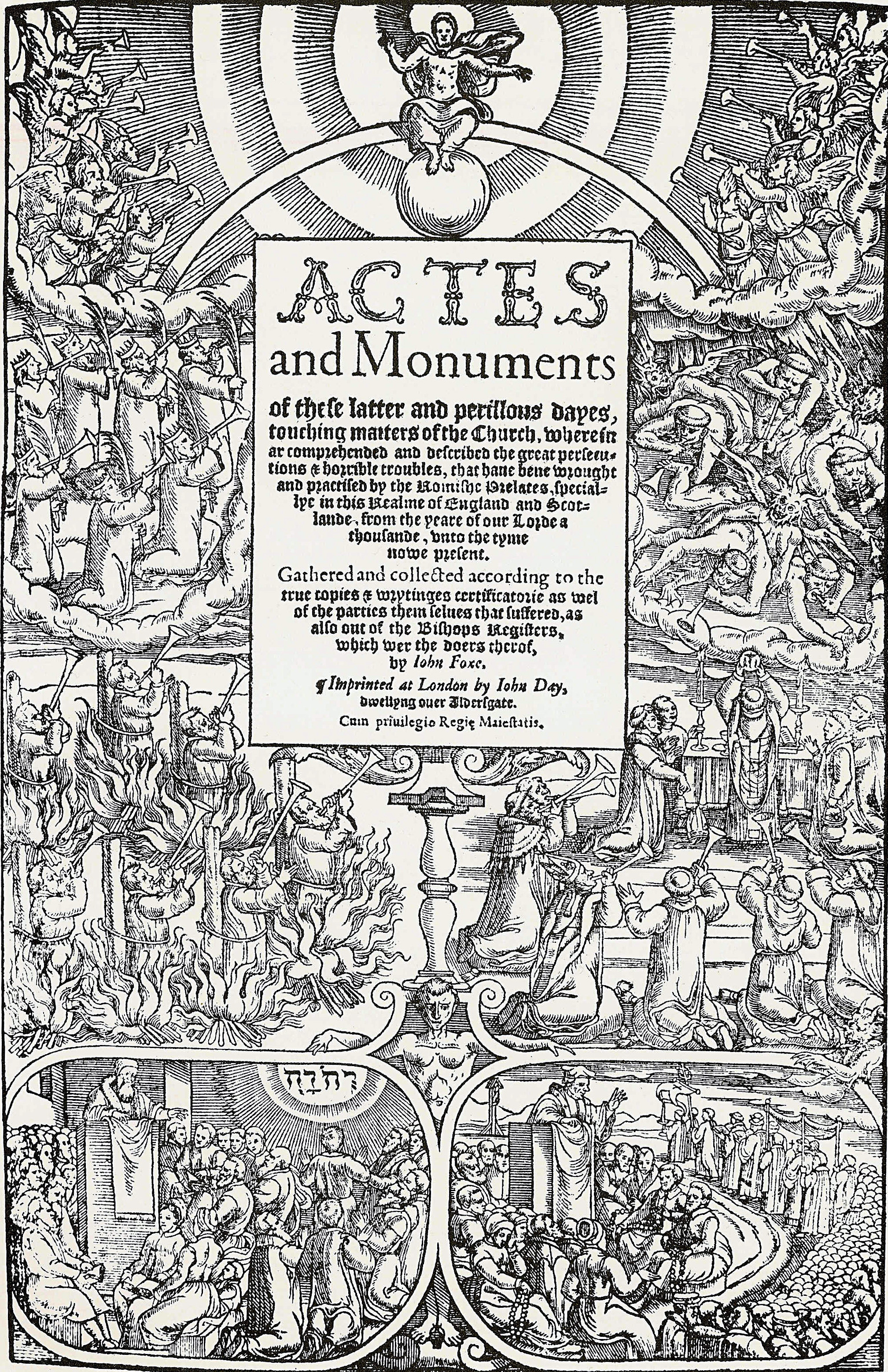
Frontispiece to the 1563 edition of The Book of Martyrs

The book was produced and illustrated with over sixty distinctive woodcut impressions and was to that time the largest publishing project ever undertaken in England. (Common descriptions in this paragraph and next: King 2006, Evenden & Freeman 2011, Mozley 1940, Haller 1963, Wooden 1983, White 1963). Their product was a single volume book, a bit over a foot long, two palms-span wide, too deep or thick to lift with only one hand given it exceeded 1500 pages, and weighing about the same as a small infant. (Note: The uncommon measures used to focus the materiality of this book, registering its physical impact, as experienced even by twentieth century readers. Description derived in private communication among Patrick Collinson, Devorah Greenberg and Mark Greengrass while examining a first edition book (July 2001, Boston, Eng.))

Foxe's own title for the first edition (as scripted and spelled), is Actes and Monuments of these Latter and Perillous Days, Touching Matters of the Church. Long titles were conventionally expected at the time, so this title continues and claims that the book describes "persecutions and horrible troubles" that had been "wrought and practiced by the Roman Prelates, speciallye in this realm of England and Scotland". Foxe's temporal range was "from the yeare of our Lorde a thousand unto the tyme nowe present"

Following closely on the heels of the first edition (Foxe complained that the text was produced at "a breakneck speed"), the 1570 edition was in two volumes and had expanded considerably. The page count went from approximately 1,800 pages in 1563 to over 2,300 folio pages. The number of woodcuts increased from 60 to 150. As Foxe wrote about his own living (or executed) contemporaries, the illustrations could not be borrowed from existing texts, as was commonly practiced. The illustrations were newly cut to depict particular details, linking England's suffering back to "the primitive tyme" until, in volume I, "the reigne of King Henry VIII"; in volume two, from H "Queen Elizabeth our gracious Lady now reigning."

Foxe's title for the second edition (vol I) is quite different from the first edition where he claimed his material as "these latter days of peril...touching on matters of the Church'. In 1570, Foxe's book is an "Ecclesiastical History" containing "the acts and monuments [no capitals] of thynges passed in every kynges tyme in this realm [England], specially in the Church of England". It describes "persecutions, horrible troubles, the suffering of martyrs [new], and other such thinges incident ... in England and Scotland, and [new] all other foreign nations". The second volume of the 1570 edition has its own title page and, again, an altered subject.

Volume II is an "Ecclesiastical History conteyning the Acts and Monuments of Martyrs" [capitalized in original] and offers "a general discourse of these latter persecutions, horrible troubles and tumults styred up by Romish ['Roman' in 1563] Prelates in the Church". Again leaving the reference, to which church, uncertain, the title concludes "in this realm of England and Scotland as partly also to all other foreign nations apparteynyng".

== Title ==
Actes and Monuments for almost all its existence has popularly been called the Book of Martyrs. The linking of titles is an expected norm for introducing John Foxe's sixteenth century work. William Haller (1963) observed that "[Bishop] Edmund Grindal called it a book of martyrs, and the name stuck." (Note: That it was Grindal's project to produce an English 'book of martyrs' see Patrick Collinson, Archbishop Grindal The Struggle for the reformed church, 78-82. The professor was following Grindal's trail, and revealed no further correspondence between the two men after Grindal's 1558 letter to Foxe, from the ship that took him to a Bishopric in London. Grindal wrote to Foxe still in Basle 'to hold up production' of his [Foxe's] proposed Latin edition) It may have contained Grindal's "book of English martyrs" (as he had conceived the project), but it was not John Foxe's. Dismayed by the popular misconception, Foxe tried to correct the error in the second edition. That his appeal was ineffective in his own time is not surprising; very few people would even have read it. Continuing this practice in academic analyses is being questioned, particularly in light of Foxe's explicit denial.

I wrote no such booke bearying the title Booke of Martyrs. I wrote a booke called the Acts and Monumentes ... wherin many other matters be contayned beside the martyrs of Christ.

— John Foxe, The Actes and Monuments (1570)

There is also evidence that the "martyr" title referred only to the abridgments, as used by John Milner (1795), no friend to Foxe, whose major work Milner situates at the centre of efforts to "inflame hatred" against Catholics in the eighteenth century.

We find the lying Acts and Monuments of John Foxe, with large wooden prints of men and women, encompassed with faggots and flames in every leaf of them, chained to the desks of many county churches, whilst abridgements of this inflammatory work are annually issued from the London press under the title of The Book of Martyrs. (Note: John Milner, History Civil and Ecclesiastical and Survey of Antiquities of Winchester (1795), cited in Wooden 1983, p. 106)

== Work of the English Reformation ==
Published early in the reign of Queen Elizabeth I and only five years after the death of the Roman Catholic Queen Mary I, Foxe's Acts and Monuments was an affirmation of the English Reformation in a period of religious conflict between Catholics and the Church of England. Foxe's account of church history asserted a historical justification that was intended to establish the Church of England as a continuation of the true Christian church rather than as a modern innovation, and it contributed significantly to encourage nationally endorsed repudiation of the Catholic Church. (Note: Linking Foxe's text to nationalism is so conventional that it had become 'old hat', as Patrick Collinson observed, while composing another essay expressing the connection between Foxe's text and nationalism -- which is not the same as exhibiting a connection between religious sentiment and nationalism. The nineteenth-century Welsh chose to break away from the Anglican Church as a matter of politics and an expression of national ethnic and linguistic difference that they intended not to lose entirely.)

The sequence of the work, initially in five books, covered first early Christian martyrs, a brief history of the medieval church, including the Inquisitions, and a history of the Wycliffite or Lollard movement. (Note: Foxe and other English reformers interpreted Wycliffe as a forerunner (indeed, "the morning star") of the Reformation.) It then dealt with the reigns of Henry VIII and Edward VI, during which the dispute with Rome had led to the separation of the English Church from papal authority and the issuance of the Book of Common Prayer. The final book treated the reign of Queen Mary and the Marian Persecutions.

== Editions ==
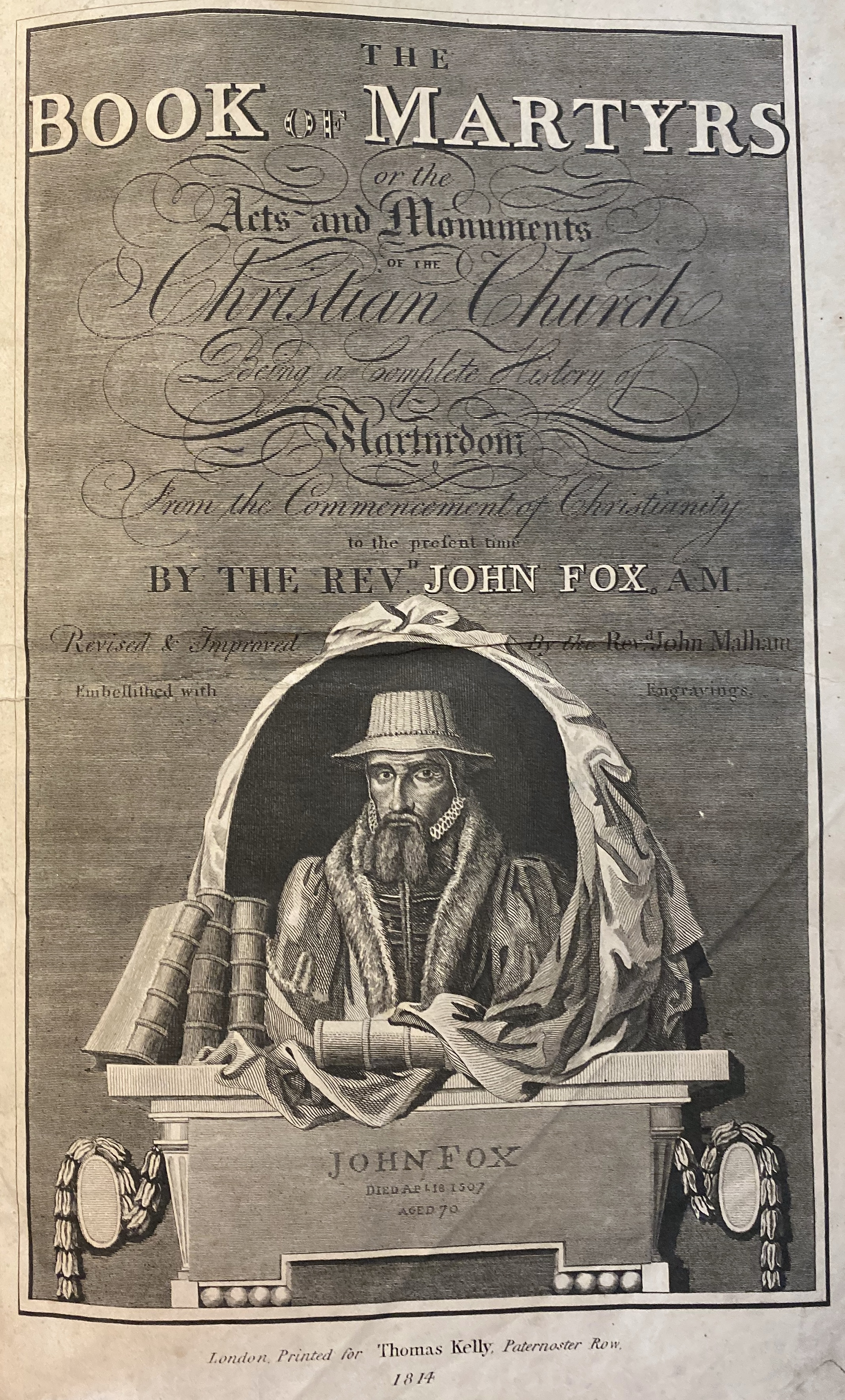
Engraved Title page from Fox's Book of Martyrs, pub by Thomas Kelly in 1814 (folio)

John Foxe died in 1587. His text, however, continued to grow. Foxe himself set the precedent, substantially expanding Actes and Monuments between 1563 and 1570. The 1576 edition was cheaply done, with few changes, but for the 1583 printing Foxe added a "Discourse of the Bloody Massacre In France [St. Bartholomew's. Day, 1572]" and other short pieces. The 1596 fifth edition was essentially a reprint of the 1583 edition. The next editor, however, followed Foxe's example and in 1610 brought the work "up to the time of King James" and included a retelling of the French massacre. The 1632 edition added a topical outline and chronology, along with a "continuation of the foreign martyrs; additions of like persecutions in these later times" which included the Spanish invasion (1588), and the Gunpowder Plot (1605). The editor for the 1641 edition brought it to "the time of Charles, now King", and added a new copperplate portrait of John Foxe to accompany Simeon Foxe's "Life" of his father. The most "sumptuous" edition of 1684 anticipated James with gilt-edged, heavy bond paper and copperplate etchings that replaced worn-out woodcut illustrations.

As edition followed edition, Actes and Monuments or "Foxe" began to refer to an iconic series of texts; unless constrained by a narrow band of time, Acts and Monuments has always referred to more than a single edition. The popular influence of the text declined, and by the nineteenth century it had narrowed to include mainly scholars and evangelicals. It was still sufficiently popular among them to warrant (at least) fifty-five printings of various abridgments in only a century, and to generate scholarly editions and commentary. Debate about Foxe's veracity and the text's contribution to anti-Catholic propaganda continued. Actes and Monuments survived whole primarily within academic circles, with remnants only of the original text appearing in abridgments, generically called The Book of Martyrs, or plain Foxe. Some copies, including that presented to Matthew Parker, were hand-coloured.

Notable Editions and Derivative Works of "The Acts and Monuments"
| Edition | Date | Features |
|---|---|---|
| Strasbourg Latin Edition | 1554 | persecution of Lollards |
| Basel Latin Edition | 1559 | Although J. F. Mozley calls this "no more than a fragment", it has 732 numbered pages, much of it concerning the reign of Mary Tudor. |
| 1st English Edition printed by John Day | March 1563 | "gigantic folio volume" ~1800 pages |
| 2nd Edition, with John Field | 1570 | response to Catholic critics; "two gigantic folio volumes, with 2300 very large pages" |
| 3rd Edition | 1576 | reprint, inferior paper, small type |
| 4th Edition | 1583 | last in Foxe's lifetime, "2 volumes of about 2000 folio pages in double columns" |
| Timothy Bright's Abridged Edition | 1589 | dedicated to Sir Francis Walsingham |
| Clement Cotton's Abridged Edition | 1613 | titled Mirror of Martyrs |
| 6th edition | 1610 | 2 volumes; 1952 pages plus 27-page unpaginated index. Includes the Gunpowder Plot. Titled Actes and monuments of matters most speciall and memorable, happening in the Church : with an vniuersall historie of the same ... |
| Rev. Thomas Mason of Odiham's Abridged Edition | 1615 | titled Christ's Victorie over Sathans Tyrannie |
| Edition of the original | 1641 | Contains memoir of Foxe, now attributed to his son Simeon Fox. |
| Edward Leigh's Abridged Edition | 1651 | titled Memorable Collections |
| Jacob Bauthumley | 1676 | Brief Historical Relation of the Most Material Passages and Persecutions of the Church of Christ |
| Paul Wright | 1784 | The New and Complete Book of Martyrs, an update to cover the 18th century |
| Thomas Kelly | 1814 | The Book of Martyrs ..., "Revised & Improved by the Rev. John Malham", in folio |
| Edition by Stephen Reed Cattley with Life and Vindication of John Foxe by George Townsend, in eight volumes | 1837–41 | Much criticised by Samuel Roffey Maitland on scholarly grounds. |
| Michael Hobart Seymour | 1838 | The Acts and Monuments of the Church; containing the history and sufferings of the martyrs; popular and reprinted Victorian edition. |

=== Latin versions ===
Foxe began his work in 1552, during the reign of Edward VI. Over the next thirty years, it developed from small beginnings (in Latin) to a substantial compilation, in English, filling two large folio volumes. In 1554, in exile, Foxe published in Latin at Strasbourg a foreshadowing of his major work, emphasizing the persecution of the English Lollards during the fifteenth century; and he began to collect materials to continue his story to his own day.

Foxe published the version in Latin at Basel in August 1559, lacking sources, with the segment dealing with the Marian martyrs as "no more than a fragment." Of course, it was difficult to write contemporary English history while living (as he later said) "in the far parts of Germany, where few friends, no conference, [and] small information could be had."

John Foxe made a reputation through his Latin works. Both these versions were intended as the first volume of a two-volume work, the second volume to have a broader, European scope. Foxe did not publish these works; but a second volume to the Basel version was written by Henry Pantaleon (1563). Study has shown this period of the exiled English communities and their return to England in 1558, as the trained elite who would ensure a Protestant England.

=== First edition ===
In March 1563, Foxe published the first English edition of The Actes and Monuments from the press of John Day. Day's epitaph reads: "He set a Foxe to write how martyrs run/By death to life. Foxe ventured pains and health/To give them light: Daye spent in print his wealth,/And God with gain restored his wealth again,/ And gave to him as he gave to the poor." It was a "gigantic folio volume" of about 1800 pages, about three times the length of the 1559 Latin book. As is typical for the period, the full title was a paragraph long and is abbreviated by scholars as Acts and Monuments. Publication of the book made Foxe famous; the book sold for more than ten shillings, three weeks' pay for a skilled craftsman, but with no royalty to the author. The full title is Actes and Monuments of these latter and perilous days, touching matters of the Church, wherein are comprehended and described the great persecutions and horrible troubles that have been wrought and practised by the Romish prelates, specially in this realm of England and Scotland, from the year of our Lord 1000 unto the time now present; gathered and collected according to the true copies and writings certificatory, as well of the parties themselves that suffered, as also out of the bishops' registers, which were the doers thereof; by John Foxe.

=== Second edition ===
The second edition appeared in 1570, much expanded. New material was available, including personal testimonies, and publications such as the 1564 edition of Jean Crespin's Geneva martyrology. John Field assisted with research for this edition.

Acts and Monuments was immediately attacked by Catholics, including Thomas Harding, Thomas Stapleton, and Nicholas Harpsfield. In the next generation, Robert Parsons, an English Jesuit, also struck at Foxe in A Treatise of Three Conversions of England (1603–04). Harding, in the spirit of the age, called Acts and Monuments ' "that huge dunghill of your stinking martyrs," full of a thousand lies'. In the second edition, where the charges of his critics had been reasonably accurate, Foxe removed the offending passages. Where he could rebut the charges, "he mounted a vigorous counter-attack, seeking to crush his opponent under piles of documents." (Note: In short, Foxe reacted to Harpsfield's challenge like the commander of a besieged city, abandoning what could not be defended and fortifying what could. Harpsfield drove Foxe to more intensive and extensive research and made his martyrology a more impressive, although not necessarily more accurate, work of scholarship.") Even with deletions, the second edition was nearly double the size of the first, "two gigantic folio volumes, with 2300 very large pages" of double-columned text.

The edition was well received by the English church, and the upper house of the convocation of Canterbury, meeting in 1571, ordered that a copy of the Bishop's Bible and "that full history entitled Monuments of Martyrs" be installed in every cathedral church and that church officials place copies in their houses for the use of servants and visitors. The decision repaid the financial risks taken by Day.

=== Third and fourth editions ===
Foxe published a third edition in 1576, but it was virtually a reprint of the second, although printed on inferior paper and in smaller type. The fourth edition, published in 1583, the last in Foxe's lifetime, had larger type and better paper and consisted of "two volumes of about two thousand folio pages in double columns." Nearly four times the length of the Bible, the fourth edition was "the most physically imposing, complicated, and technically demanding English book of its era. It seems safe to say that it is the largest and most complicated book to appear during the first two or three centuries of English printing history." At this point Foxe began to compose his interpretation of the Apocalypse; he wrote more in Eicasmi (1587), left unfinished at his death.

The 1583 title page included the poignant request that the author "desireth thee, good reader, to help him with thy prayer."

== Abridgements and derived works ==
The first abridgment appeared in 1589. Offered only two years after Foxe's death, it honoured his life and was a timely commemorative for the English victory against the Spanish Armada (1588). Issued with a dedication to Sir Francis Walsingham, Timothy Bright's tight summary of Acts and Monuments headed a succession of hundreds of editions of texts based on Foxe's work, whose editors were more selective in their reading. Based with greater or lesser degrees of exactitude on the original Acts and Monuments, yet influenced always by it, editors continued to tell its tale in both popular and academic venues (although a different tale was told to each gathering).

=== "The Book{s} of Martyrs" ===
The majority of the editors knew Foxe's text as a martyrology. Taking their material primarily from the final two books of Acts and Monuments (that is, volume II of the 1570 edition), they generated derived texts that genuinely were "Book(s) of Martyrs". Famous scenes from Acts and Monuments, in illustrated text, were revived for each new generation. The earliest printed book bearing the title Book of Martyrs, however, appears to be John Taylor's edition in 1631. While occurring again periodically, that title was not much in use before 1750, and not regularized as the title of choice before 1850. The title, Foxe's Book of Martyrs (where the author's name reads as if part of the title) appears first in John Kennedy's 1840 edition, possibly as a printing error. (Note: The Short Title Registry of the Stationers's Company (STC) lists the first printed text by John Taylor, 1631, The Book of Martyrs (STC 23732); next appearance is in 1732, by "An Impartial Hand" (ESTC T118078); Kennedy, Foxe's Book of Martyrs, 1840, OCLC 22456257. 'Chrolonological Bibliography' in "Reflexive Foxe: The Book of Martyrs Transformed (unpubl diss, SFU 2002); and "'Foxe' as a Methodological Response to Epistemic Challenges: The Book of Martyrs Transported, John Foxe at Home and Abroad David Loades, ed. (Ashgate 2004), 'Sample Bibliography' pp.253–255.)

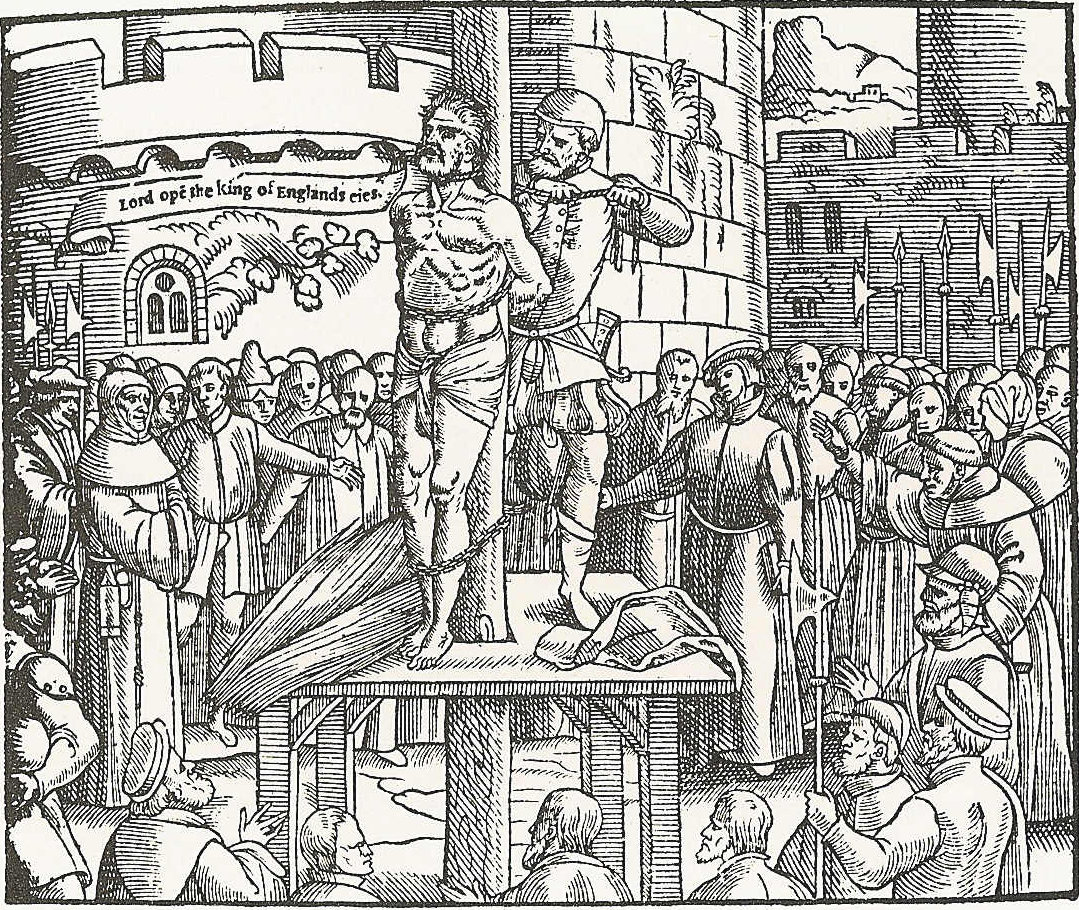
William Tyndale, just before being strangled and burned at the stake, cries out, "Lord, open the King of England's eyes", in woodcut from an early edition of Foxe's Book of Martyrs.

Characterized by some scholars as "Foxe's bastards", these Foxe-derived texts have received attention as the medium through which Foxe and his ideas influenced popular consciousness. Nineteenth-century professionalizing scholars, who wanted to distinguish the academically significant Acts and Monuments from the derived "vulgar corruption", dismissed these later editions as expressing "narrowly evangelical Protestant piety" and as nationalistic tools produced only "to club Catholics". Very little, still, is known about any of these editions. Characterized most recently as 'Foxe', with ironic quotation marks signaling a suspect term, and also as "Foxe-in-action", these Foxe-derived texts await researchers.

== Foxe as a historian ==
The author's credibility was challenged as soon as the book first appeared. Detractors accused Foxe of dealing falsely with the evidence, of misusing documents, and of telling partial truths.

In the early nineteenth century the charges were taken up again by a number of authors, most importantly Samuel Roffey Maitland. Subsequently, Foxe was considered a poor historian, in mainstream reference works. The 1911 Encyclopædia Britannica said this of Foxe "The gross blunders due to carelessness have often been exposed, and there is no doubt that Foxe was only too ready to believe evil of the Catholics, and he cannot always be exonerated from the charge of wilful falsification of evidence. It should, however, be remembered in his honour that his advocacy of religious toleration was far in advance of his day.[11th ed., volume 10, p.770]"; two years later in the Catholic Encyclopedia, Francis Fortescue Urquhart wrote of the value of the documentary content and eyewitness reports, but claimed that Foxe "sometimes dishonestly mutilates his documents and is quite untrustworthy in his treatment of evidence". The 14th edition of Encyclopedia Britannica (1960 printing) has an article on John Foxe written by J.F. Mozley who himself wrote a book "John Foxe and His Book" in 1940. Mozley was certainly sympathetic to John Foxe and Foxe's Book of Martyrs (see the Bibliography for Mozley's book). Mozley in summary concerning Foxe's Book of Martyrs states the following: "It is indeed prolix [i.e. long-winded], unsystematic, carelessly edited, one-sided, oversharp, sometimes credulous. But it is honest and it is strong in facts....It opens a window on the English Reformation by preserving much firsthand material unobtainable elsewhere.. . .The charges of deliberate falsification brought against him by Alan Cope (1566), Robert Parsons(1603) and some moderns [viz. S.R. Maitland etc.-ed] have no substance." (Encyclopedia Britannica,14th ed., 1960, Vol. 9, p. 573).

=== Foxe's source reliability ===
In contrast, J. F. Mozley maintained that Foxe preserved a high standard of honesty, arguing that Foxe's method of using his sources "proclaims the honest man, the sincere seeker after truth." (Note: "What the intent and custom is of the papists to do, I cannot tell: for mine own I will say, although many other vices I have, yet from this one I have always of nature abhorred, wittingly to deceive any man or child, so near as I could, much less the church of God, whom I with all my heart do reverence, and with fear obey." Acts and Monuments, 3, 393.) The 2009 Encyclopædia Britannica notes that Foxe's work is "factually detailed and preserves much firsthand material on the English Reformation unobtainable elsewhere." It was typical, however, in the late nineteenth and early decades of the twentieth centuries to treat Foxe's text as "not to be trusted....If not the father of lies, Foxe was thought to be the master of inventions, and so readers of the Encyclopedia [sic] Britannica were advised and warned."

=== Documented grounds ===
Foxe based his accounts of martyrs before the early modern period on previous writers, including Eusebius, Bede, Matthew Paris, and many others. He compiled an English martyrology from the period of the Lollards through to the persecution of Protestants by Mary I. Here Foxe had primary sources to draw on: episcopal registers, reports of trials, and the testimony of eyewitnesses. In the work of collection Foxe had Henry Bull as collaborator. The account of the Marian years is based on Robert Crowley's 1559 extension of a 1549 chronicle history by Thomas Cooper, itself an extension of a work begun by Thomas Lanuet. Cooper (who became a Church of England Bishop) strongly objected to Crowley's version of his history and soon issued two new "correct" editions. (Note: Cooper, Crowley and Foxe had all been students and fellows together at Magdalen College, at Oxford University. Foxe and Crowley both resigned from the college, apparently under pressure: Foxe then wrote to the college president objecting that all three had been persecuted by masters in the college, for holding dissenting beliefs.) John Bale set Foxe onto martyrological writings and contributed to a substantial part of Foxe's ideas as well as printed material.

=== Objectivity and advocacy ===
Foxe's book is in no sense an impartial account of the period. He did not hold to later centuries' notions of neutrality or objectivity, but made unambiguous side glosses on his text, such as "Mark the apish pageants of these popelings" and "This answer smelleth of forging and crafty packing." David Loades has suggested that Foxe's history of the political situation, at least, is 'remarkably objective'. He makes no attempt to make martyrs out of Wyatt and his followers, or anyone else who was executed for treason, except George Eagles, whom he describes as "falsely accused."

In their 1952 British Authors before 1800: A Biographical Dictionary, Kunitz and Haycraft wrote, "For a century at least it was practically required reading in every English-speaking Puritan household, often the only book owned except the Bible. Probably no single book has caused so many neuroses as has this one. Foxe was a fanatical Protestant, wrote with feverish energy, was completely credulous, and reveled in horror. No detail is too small or too dreadful to be described minutely, and no invective too violent to be applied to the Roman Catholics—for to his mind there were no martyrs except Protestants. His only theme is suffering, and he mangles his readers' nerves with one long monotony of agony and terror."

Sidney Lee, in the Dictionary of National Biography, called Foxe "a passionate advocate, ready to accept any primā facie evidence". Lee also listed some specific errors and suggested that John Foxe plagiarized. Thomas S. Freeman observes that, like a hypothetical barrister, Foxe had to deal with the evidence of what actually happened, evidence that he was rarely in a position to forge. But he would not present facts damaging to his client, and he had the skills that enabled him to arrange the evidence so as to make it conform to what he wanted it to say. Like the barrister, Foxe presents crucial evidence and tells a side of the story which must be heard, but his text should never be read uncritically, and his partisan objectives should always be kept in mind."

By the end of the 17th century, however, the work tended to be abbreviated to include only "the most sensational episodes of torture and death" thus giving to Foxe's work "a lurid quality which was certainly far from the author's intention."

It is true that Acts and Monuments "tended to be abbreviated". The second part of the claim, however, is in error. It could be simply deleted as an error, but it repeats and elaborates William Haller's second thesis as if a fact, that the later Foxe-derived abridgements had lost entirely intellect's levening influence. (The "Elect Nation" was Haller's first thesis). Haller read through some of the Foxe-derived martyrologies, editions by Martin Madan, John Milner and John Wesley, and observed "a progressive corruption and vulgarization of the original for the propagation of an increasingly narrow Protestant piety".

William Haller did not refer to "sensational episodes of torture and death", nor did he report on any texts reduced "only" to such matter. Neither has any specific edition been exhibited as proof, yet, it is conventionally believed and so frequently asserted that Sidney Lee, and Thomas Freeman after him, state it as a true overgeneralization. Thus, it should not be deleted as a simple error in fact, even if it is wrong. A scan of the titles for Foxe-derived editions make the claim unlikely, and Reflexive Foxe: The 'Book of Martyrs' Transformed, prove it false; findings supported by Haller and Wooden's less comprehensive glimpses into the later abridgments. (Note: From a 'Chronological Bibliography of Acts and Monuments~"Book[s] of Martyrs"/Foxe (16-20th centuries), a short list will follow 'Works Cited' in the references pages for this article. Note: STC and ESTC show the so-called 'popular' title, the 'Book of Martyrs' first used in 1631, by John Taylor; the title is not used again until 1741 by 'An Impartial Hand'.)

Acts and Monuments was cannibalized for material to warn of the dangers of Catholicism and, in Foxe's name, also to undermine resurgent High Church Anglicanism. The author's credibility and the text's reliability became suspect, then, for both Catholic and Anglican Church defenders. Samuel Roffey Maitland, Richard Frederick Littledale as well as Robert Parsons and John Milner, mounted campaigns to disprove Foxe's findings. Maitland's and others' critiques helped to awaken increasing antagonism toward intolerance in the public conscience. Combined with professionalized academic dissociation, left no voices to speak in Foxe's defence, and reduced Foxe's historical credibility such that "no one with any literary pretensions...ventured to quote Foxe as an authority."

John Milner, defender of the "old religion" (Catholicism), authored several tracts, pamphlets, essays, and Letters to the Editor: "Dear Sir…"; using all public means available to him for declaring that abuse of Englishmen was occurring "frequently", ipso edem, the defamation and harassment of Catholics in England – a treatment not similarly visited on Sectarian communities or the Quakers.

Milner's life project to discredit "Foxe" was polemical—that was the point of arguing: to persuade people to see things as the speaker constructed or, at least, to seeing some merit to his case. Before the Houses of Parliament in the years of Milner's and others activism, were bills for relieving English Catholics of tax penalties (for being Catholic), having to tithe to the Anglican Church, and relief from imposition of the Oath that stood between any Catholic and a government position.

The publication of J. F. Mozley's biography of Foxe in 1940 reflected a change in perspective that reevaluated Foxe's work and "initiated a rehabilitation of Foxe as a historian which has continued to this day." A new critical edition of the Actes and Monuments appeared in 1992.

"Since Mozley's landmark study (1940)," Warren Wooden observed in 1983, "Foxe's reputation as a careful and accurate, albeit partisan, historian especially of the events of his own day, has been cleansed and restored with the result that modern historians no longer feel constrained to apologize automatically for evidence and examples drawn from the Acts and Monuments." Patrick Collinson's formal acknowledgement and recognition of "John Foxe as Historian," invites redetermining historians' current relationship with the text. John Foxe was the "greatest [English] historian of his age," Collinson concluded, "and the greatest revisionist ever".

== Religious perspectives ==
Anglicans consider Foxe's book a witness to the sufferings of faithful Protestants at the hands of anti-Protestant Catholic authorities and their endurance unto death, seen as a component of English identity. Foxe emphasizes hearing or reading the Holy Scripture in the native language without mediation through a priesthood.

Catholics consider Foxe a significant source of English anti-Catholicism, charging among other objections to the work, that the treatment of martyrdoms under Mary ignores the contemporary mingling of political and religious motives — for instance, ignoring the possibility that some victims may have intrigued to remove Mary from the throne.

== Influence ==
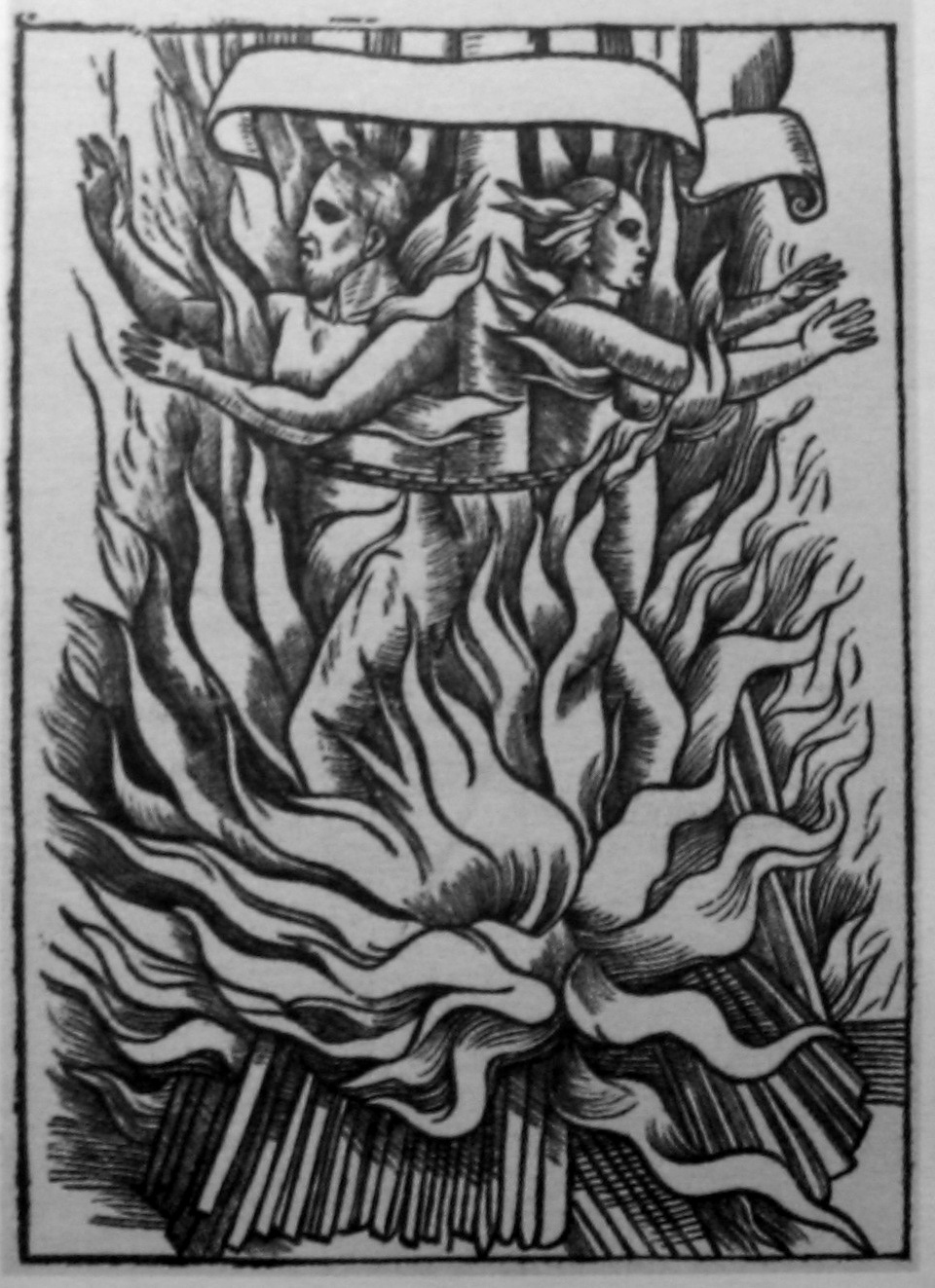
Dual martyrdom by burning, 1558; from a 1641 edition of Foxe.

Following a 1571 Convocation order, Foxe's Acts and Monuments was chained beside the Great Bible in cathedrals, select churches, and even several bishops' and guild halls. Selected readings from the text were proclaimed from the pulpit as was (and as if it were) Scripture. It was read and cited by both ecclesiastical and common folk, disputed by prominent Catholics, and defended by prominent Anglicans. Acts and Monuments sailed with England's gentleman pirates, encouraged the soldiers in Oliver Cromwell's army, and decorated the halls at Oxford and Cambridge. (Note: Information commonly described in Haller, Loades, Wooden, Greenberg and White, among others, noted previously.)

Acts and Monuments is credited as among the most influential of English texts. Gordon Rupp called it "an event". He counted it as a "normative document", and as one of the Six Makers of English Religion. (Note: Along with William Tyndale's Bible in English, Thomas Cranmer's "Book of Common Prayer", Miltons "Paradise Lost", John Bunyan's "Pilgrim's Progress", and Isaac Watts's "Hymns". Gordon Rupp, Six Makers of English Religion 1500-1700 (London, 1957), p 53.) Nor was Foxe's influence limited to the direct effects of his text. At least two of Rupp's Makers continued and elaborated Foxe's views. Christopher Hill, with others, has noted that John Bunyan cherished his Book of Martyrs among the few books that he kept with him while imprisoned. William Haller observed that John Milton's Of Reformation in England, and other tracts, took "not only the substance of the account… but also the point of view straight out of John Foxe's Acts and Monuments." Haller means by this, "the view of history advanced by propaganda in support of the national settlement in church and state under Elizabeth, kept going by the increasing reaction against the politics of her successors, and revived with great effect by the puritan opposition to Anglican prelacy in the Long Parliament."

After Foxe's death, the Acts and Monuments continued to be published and appreciatively read. John Burrow refers to it as, after the Bible, "the greatest single influence on English Protestant thinking of the late Tudor and early Stuart period."

== Position in English consciousness ==
The original Acts and Monuments was printed in 1563. This text, its dozens of textual alterations (Foxe's Book of Martyrs in many forms), and their scholarly interpretations, helped to frame English consciousness (national, religious and historical), for over four hundred years. Evoking images of the sixteenth-century martyred English, of Elizabeth enthroned, the Enemy overthrown, and danger averted, Foxe's text and its images served as a popular and academic code. It also alerted English folk to the threat of harboring citizens who bore allegiance to foreign powers. Acts and Monuments is academically linked with notions of English nationhood, liberty, tolerance, election, apocalypse, and Puritanism. The text helped to situate the English monarchy in a tradition of English Protestantism, particularly Whiggism; and it influenced the seventeenth-century radical tradition by providing materials for local martyrologies, ballads, and broadsheets. (Note: Common information, see: John Mozley, John Foxe and his Book (Society for the promotion of Christian Knowledge, 1940); William Haller, John Foxe's "Book of Martyrs" and the Elect Nation(Jonathon Cape. 1963). Recently updated, but more to say on print culture, than it adds to our knowledge of John Foxe, John N. King,Foxe's "Book of Martyrs" and Early Modern Print Culture (Cambridge, 2006); Thomas S. Freeman, "Life of John Foxe" TAMO; Greenberg, "Community of the Texts"; Patrick Collinson, Archbishop Grindal 1519-1583: The Struggle for a Reformed Church (London and Berkeley, 1979), 80-81.)

== In historiography ==
Warren Wooden presented John Foxe's key significance as a transitional figure in English historiography in 1983. "Foxe identified the key themes of the Reformation … along with the central props of Protestant belief." Wooden observed that Foxe also did much to determine the grounds of the controversy. By offering a full-scale historical investigation, "Foxe helped to shape the controversy along historical and prophetic lines, rather than epistemological or linguistic ones." Patrick Collinson confirmed that Foxe was indeed a worthy scholar and that his text was historiographically reliable in 1985, and set in process the British Academy's funding for a new critical edition in 1984, completed by 2007.

Acts and Monuments acted as something of a Bible for English folk (commonly asserted) and also for academics (rarely acknowledged), influencing their histories, historical sensibility and consciousness to an unprecedented degree. University-trained researchers professionalized the original author's findings, his facts checked and challenged, being more often proved than not in seventeenth-eighteenth century inquiries, and their findings were verified through the next two centuries. Foxe's data and vision sensibly provided a foundation for informed academic conclusions. John Strype was among the early beneficiaries, and he praised John Foxe for preserving the documents on which his own ecclesiastical history depended.

Acts and Monuments substantially defined, among many other histories from John Strype onward, Arthur Geoffrey Dickens's influential The English Reformation (1964, 1989 revised), which has been characterized by a critic as "a sophisticated exposition of a story first told by John Foxe". Although Haigh's observation participates in a revisionist agenda that does not acknowledge what else he brought to the construction, Dickens' dependence on Foxe's text is indisputable. Why should that dependency be so worthy of comment? Dickens wrote a history that was informed by facts and—similarly to Milton—also the substance of his text, derived directly from Foxe's Acts and Monuments. Foxe's historical vision and the documentation to support it, was taught to young Arthur Dickens, along with his fellows, as a schoolboy.

Historiography, as the study of the writing of history, is in this case subsumed in history, as that which happened in the past and continues into the colloquial present. Discussing Foxe in the constructions of historical (national/religious) consciousness has always been also a discussion about the meaning and writing of history. Approaching this subject puts researchers into a kind of liminal zone between borders, where relations slip from one category to another – from writing history, to discussing history writing (historiography), to considering collective history in human consciousness (historical consciousness and collective memory).

The text in this case has always been multiple and complex. Several researchers have remarked on how malleable, how easily mutable Foxe's text was, and so inherently contradictory, characteristics that increased its potential influence. (Note: Glyn Parry calls it "dangerously malleable" in John Foxe: an historical perspective,, 170. As an example of how malleable, see "In a Tradition of Learned Ministry: Wesley's 'Foxe'", Journal of Ecclesiastical Studies 59/2 April 2008, pp 227-58.) It is a difficult text to pin down, what Collinson called "a very unstable entity", indeed, "a moving target". "We used to think that we were dealing with a book," Collinson mused aloud at the third Foxe Congress (1999), "understood in the ordinary sense of that term, a book written by an author, subject to progressive revision but always the same book ... and [we thought] that what Foxe intended he brought about."

Through the late nineties and into the twenty-first century, the Foxe Project has maintained funding for the new critical edition of Acts and Monuments and to help promote Foxeian studies, including five "John Foxe" Congresses and four publications of their collected papers, in addition to dozens of related articles and two specialized books or more produced independently.

== Modern reception and anniversary ==
March 2013 marked 450 years since Foxe's 1563 publication. Foxe's first edition capitalized on the new technology of the printing press. Similarly, the new critical edition of Acts and Monuments benefits from, and is shaped by, new technology. Digitalized for the internet generation, scholars can now search and cross-reference each of the first four editions, and benefit from several essays introducing the texts. The conceptual repertoire available for reading has so altered from that of John Foxe's era that it has been asked how it is possible to read it at all. Netzley posed this question focusing on the sixteenth century texts, polemics, and its readers. In its own time, and as Foxe had anticipated, people sought out the parts that felt most relevant. There is extensive literature on the culture and politics of reading in the early modern period.

Patrick Collinson concluded at the third Foxe Congress (Ohio, 1999) that as a result of the "death of the author" and necessary accommodations to the "postmodern morass" (as he termed it then), The Acts and Monuments "is no longer a book [in any conventional sense]."

== See also ==
- Canterbury Martyrs
- Colchester Martyrs
- Guernsey Martyrs
- Marian Persecutions
- Martyrology
- Martyrs Mirror (1660), by Thieleman J. van Braght
- Perth Martyrs
- Windsor Martyrs
- Robert Benet
- Thomas Benet
- Richard Bertie
- Adam Damlip
- Henry Filmer
- Anthony Pearson
- Margaret Polley
- John Rogers
- Laurence Saunders
- Robert Testwood
- Christopher Wade
- Katherine Willoughby, Duchess of Suffolk

== Bibliography ==
- Aston, Margaret; Ingram, Elizabeth (1997). "The Iconography of the Acts and Monuments". In Loades, David (ed.). John Foxe and the English Reformation. Scholar.
- Aston, Margaret (2011). "Books 10-12: The Illustrations". The Unabridged Acts and Monuments Online or TAMO. Digital Humanities Institute.
- Baldwin Smith, Lacey (1997). Fools, Martyrs and Traitors: The story of Martyrdom in the west. New York: Alfred A. Knopf. ISBN 9780810117242.
- Bright, Timothy (1589). An abridgment of the book of 'Acts and Monuments of the church' by Father Master John Foxe. London.
- Breitenberg, Mark (Fall 1989). "The Flesh made Word: Foxe's Acts and Monuments". Renaissance and Reformation. 13 (4): 381–407. JSTOR 43444741.
- Burrow, John (2008). A History of Histories. New York: Alfred A. Knopf. ISBN 9780307268525.
- Collinson, Patrick (1985). "Truth and Legend: the Veracity of John Foxe's Book of Martyrs". In Duke, A. C.; Tame, C. A. (eds.). Clio's Mirror: Historiography in Britain and the Netherlands. Zutphen. ISBN 978-9060113493.
- Collinson, Patrick (29 April – 2 May 1999). John Foxe and National Consciousness. 3rd John Foxe Congress: John Foxe and His World. State University of Ohio.
- Collinson, Patrick (2002). "John Foxe and National Consciousness". In Highley, Christopher; King, John N. (eds.). John Foxe and His World. Aldershot. pp. 10–34. doi:10.4324/9781315251486-2. ISBN 9781315251486.
- Dickens, Arthur G. (1964). The English Reformation. London.
- Fairfield, Leslie P. (1976). John Bale: Mythmaker for the English Reformation. Cornell UP. ISBN 9780911198423.
- Foxe, John (1559). Rerum in ecclesia gestarum ... pars prima, in qua primum de rebus per Angliam et Scotiam gestis atque in primis de horrenda sub Maria nuper regina persecutione narratio continetur. "The last page states, "Atque hîc horrendae persecutionís finis fuit, sublata è uiuís Maria regina: cuius mors pòst paulò, mense Nouembris sequebatur", of the end of Mary Tudor's reign in 1558."
- Foxe, John (1563). Acts and Monuments. London: Day.
- Foxe, John (1570). Acts and Monuments. London: Day.
- Foxe, John (1641). The Ecclesiasticall historie: containing the Acts and monuments of martyrs ...
- Evenden, Elizabeth; Freeman, Thomas S. (2011). Religion and the Book in Early Modern England: The Making of John Foxe's 'Book of Martyrs'. Cambridge University Press. ISBN 9780521833493 – via Google Books.
- Freeman, Thomas (2011). "John Foxe: A Biography". The Unabridged Acts and Monuments Online or TAMO. Sheffield: Digital Humanities Institute.
- Greenberg, Devorah (2002). Reflexive Foxe: The Book of Martyrs Transformed, sixteenth to twenty-first centuries (unpublished dissertation). SFU.
- Greenberg, Devorah (2004a). Loades, David (ed.). "'Foxe' as a Methodological Response to Epistemic Challenges:"The Book of Martyrs Transported"". John Foxe at Home and Abroad. Aldershot: 237–255. OCLC 53097181.
- Greenberg, Devorah (2004b). "Eighteenth-century 'Foxe': History, Historiography, and Historical Consciousness". The Unabridged Acts and Monuments Online or TAMO. Sheffield: Digital Humanrities Institute.
- Greenberg, Devorah (5–7 July 2004c). Truth and Veracity: The Legend of 'Foxe'. 5th Foxe Congress: John Foxe and the Catholic Tradition. Magdalene College, Cambridge University.
- Greenberg, Devorah (2005). "Community of the Texts: Producing the first and the second 'Acts and Monuments'". Sixteenth Century Journal. 36 (3): 695–715. doi:10.2307/20477486. JSTOR 20477486.
- Greenberg, Devorah (April 2008). "In a Tradition of Learned Ministry: Wesley's 'Foxe'". Journal of Ecclesiastical Studies. 59 (2): 227–258. doi:10.1017/S0022046907002515.
- Haigh, Christopher (1987). "Introduction". In Haigh, Christopher (ed.). The English Reformation Revised. Cambridge. doi:10.1017/CBO9780511622113. ISBN 9780511622113.
- Hall, David D. (1989). Worlds of Wonder, Days of Judgment: Popular Religious Belief in Early New England. Harvard University Press. ISBN 9780674962163.
- Haller, William (1963). John Foxe's "Book of Martyrs" and the Elect Nation. Jonathon Cape.
- Haller, William (1962). "The Tragedy of God's Englishman". In Mazzeo, J.A. (ed.). Reason and the Imagination: Studies in the History of Ideas 1600-1800. New York.
- Harris, Jose (1994). Private Lives, Public Spirit: a Social History of Britain, 1870-1914. London: Penguin. ISBN 978-0140125481.
- Haydon, Colin (1993). Anti-Catholicism in Eighteenth-century England, c. 1714-80: a political and social study. Manchester University Press. p. 29. ISBN 9780719028595.
- Highley, Christopher; King, John N., eds. (2002). John Foxe and his World. Ashgate. ISBN 9780754603061.
- Hill, Christopher (1988). A Turbulent, Seditious, and Factious People. Oxford. ISBN 9781784786861.
- Hughes, Philip (1951). Reformation in England. Vol. II (5th ed.).
- Jeffrey, David L. (1992). A Dictionary of Biblical Tradition in English Literature. Wm. B. Eerdmans Publishing. ISBN 978-0-8028-3634-2.
- Ridley, Jasper (2001). Bloody Mary's Martyrs: The story of England's Terror. New York: Caroll and Graf. ISBN 9781841193359.
- King, John N. (1999). Tudor Royal Iconography: Literature and Art in an age of Religious Crisis. Princeton University Press.
- King, John N. (2006). Foxe's Book of Martyrs and Early Modern Print Culture. Cambridge: Cambridge University Press.
  Review: Pettegree, Andrew (February 2008). "John N. King. Foxe's Book of Martyrs and Early Modern Print Culture". Review. The Review of English Studies. 59 (238): 147–148. doi:10.1093/res/hgm136.
- King, John N. (2009). Foxe's Book of Martyrs: Select Narratives. Oxford: Oxford University Press.
- Kunitz, Stanley J.; Haycraft, Howard (1952). British Authors Before 1800: A Biographical Dictionary. New York.
- Lander, Jesse M. (2006). Inventing Polemic: Religion, Print and Literary culture. Oxford.
- Loades, David (1991). Reign of Mary Tudor (1 ed.). Routledge. ISBN 978-0582057593.
- Loades, David, ed. (1997). John Foxe and the English Reformation. Scholar. ISBN 9781859283516.
- Loades, David, ed. (1999). John Foxe: an historical perspective. Aldershot. ISBN 9781840146783.
- Loades, David (2011). "The Early Reception". The Unabridged Acts and Monuments Online or TAMO. Digital Humanities Institute.
- Luborsky, Ruth Sampson (1997). "The Illustrations: Their Pattern and Plan". In Loades, David (ed.). John Foxe: Historical Perspectives. Ashgate. pp. 67–84.
- Maitland, Samuel (1837). Six letters on Foxe's Acts and Monuments. Creative Media Partners, LLC.
- Mozley, John (1940). "John Foxe and his Book". Society for the Promotion of Christian Knowledge. OCLC 2014244.
- Netzley, Ryan (Spring 2006). "An End to Reading? The practice and possibility of reading Foxe's "Acts and Monuments"". ELH. 73 (1): 187–214. doi:10.1353/elh.2006.0008. S2CID 162325126.
- Newcombe, David G.; Pidd, Michael, eds. (2001). "Facsimile of John Foxe's Book of Martyrs". The British Academy (Version 1.0 on CD-ROM). Oxford University Press.
- Nicholson, Eirwin (1999). Loades, David (ed.). "Eighteenth Century Foxe: Evidence for the impact of Acts and Monuments". John Foxe and the English Reformation. Ashgate.
- Rupp, Gordon (1957). Six Makers of English Religion 1500–1700. London.
- Oliver, Leslie M. (1943). "The Seventh edition of Actes and Monuments". The Papers of the Bibliographical Society of America. 37: 243–260. doi:10.1086/pbsa.37.4.24293456. S2CID 191395829.
- Olsen, Viggo Norskov (1973). John Foxe and the Elizabethan Church. University of California Press. p. 40. ISBN 9780520020757.
- Robinson, Benedict S (2017). "John Foxe and the Anglo-Saxons". John Foxe and his World. pp. 54–72. doi:10.4324/9781315251486-4. ISBN 9781315251486. S2CID 187212223.
- Rust, Jennifer (2013). "Reforming the Mystical Body: From Mass to Martyr in John Foxe's Acts and Monuments". ELH. 80 (3): 627–659. doi:10.1353/elh.2013.0029. S2CID 162395217.
- Sharpe, Kevin (2000). Reading Revolutions in Early Modern England. New Haven/London. ISBN 9780300081527.
- Snook, Edith (2005). Women, Reading, and the Cultural Politics of Early Modern England. Aldershot. ISBN 978-0754652564.
- Strype, John (1846). Ecclesiastical Memorials" three volumes. Vol. I. Cambridge. p. 321.
- Townsend, George (1965). Pratt, Josiah (ed.). "Life and Defence of John Foxe". Acts and Monuments 8 Vols. I:2-151. New York.
- Wooden, Warren (1983). John Foxe. Twayne. ISBN 9780805768305.
- White, Helen (1963). Tudor Books of Saints and Martyrs. Madison, WI: University of Wisconsin Press.
- Woolf, Daniel (2000). Reading History in early modern England. Cambridge. ISBN 9780521780469.
