= Philip Hunton =

British clergyman and writer

Philip Hunton (c. 1600–1682) was an English clergyman and political writer, known for his May 1643 anti-absolutist work A Treatise of Monarchy. It became a banned book under the Restoration.

== A Treatise of Monarchie (1643) ==
At the time of publication, it provoked a much better-known rebuttal, the 1648 Anarchy of a Limited and Mixed Monarchy by Robert Filmer. It was part of a pamphleteering exchange initiated by the royal chaplain Henry Ferne.

Hunton was among the few who attempted to chart a 'middle course' between the Royalists and the Parliamentarians. In his Treatise, he cites both Charles Herle (a Parliamentary supporter) and royalist Henry Ferne (against whom much of the Treatise was directed). This was though only to contradict both, and chart a new position. He outlined a theory of active/passive obedience, and active/passive resistance, arguing that, unless the defense of the whole community is at stake, it is unlawful to actively/violently resist the most tyrannous and unlawful actions of the ruler. According to William Haller, Hunton:

...labors like the rest to unriddle an absolute basis for government, but falling into the dilemma when king and parliament are found hopelessly at odds, he candidly concludes that 'in this case, which is beyond the Government, the appeal must be to the Community, as if there were no Government: and as by evidence mens Consciences are convinced, they are bound to give their utmost assistance.' This was an admission which, however faithful to the facts of the moment, worked havoc to all accustomed political reasoning.

Christopher Hill, however, calls him a "representative thinker".

His is among the few major works of the period to provide a holistic theory of the balance of powers. While other writers would make the case for Parliament in the present circumstances, and as to why Parliament should be considered supreme (indeed, Herle admits, for example, that the realm was arbitrarily subject to Parliament), Hunton argued that no power in a 'mixed government' could be supreme, and all the powers were coordinate. Indeed, it was best to be 'undecided' about the relative strength of the powers, rather than to try and enforce the supremacy of one, as that would alter the structure of government.

== Later attitudes ==
Unlike some other Parliamentary supporters, in his reprisals, Hunton remained consistent throughout, as one can see in his Vindication of the Treatise of Monarchy of March 1644. Unlike Henry Parker, who arguably moderated some of his claims regarding popular sovereignty in Jus Populi (in the face of John Maxwell's January treatise and Ferne's work), and William Bridge (whose work takes on a distinctively more radical note), Hunton essentially repeats all his points unchanged.

== Later life ==
In favour under the Commonwealth, he was made provost of New College, Oliver Cromwell's foundation in Durham. His fortunes declined under Charles II. In 1683 his books were included in a book-burning by the University of Oxford, along with those of Richard Baxter, John Harrington, Thomas Hobbes and John Milton.

== Primary sources ==
- A Treatise of Monarchy (1643)
- Vindication of Treatise (1644)
- Sacro-Sancta Regum Majestas (Maxwell)
- Jus Populi, Observations (Parker 1644 and 1642 respectively)
- Wounded Conscience (William Bridge)
- Fuller Reply to Dr. Ferne (Charles Herle)
