= Margaret Polley =

English Protestant martyr

Margaret Polley (died July 1555) was an English Protestant martyr from Popingberry, Rochester, Kent. Her story is recorded in Foxe's Book of Martyrs.

She was questioned by Maurice Griffith, Bishop of Rochester, condemned to death for heresy, and imprisoned for over a month. John Foxe wrote that Polley:

"was in the prime of her life, pious, charitable, humane, learned in the Scriptures, and beloved by all who knew her."

She was executed in Tunbridge in July 1555, on the same day as Christopher Wade.
