= John Foxe =

English historian and martyrologist (died 1587)

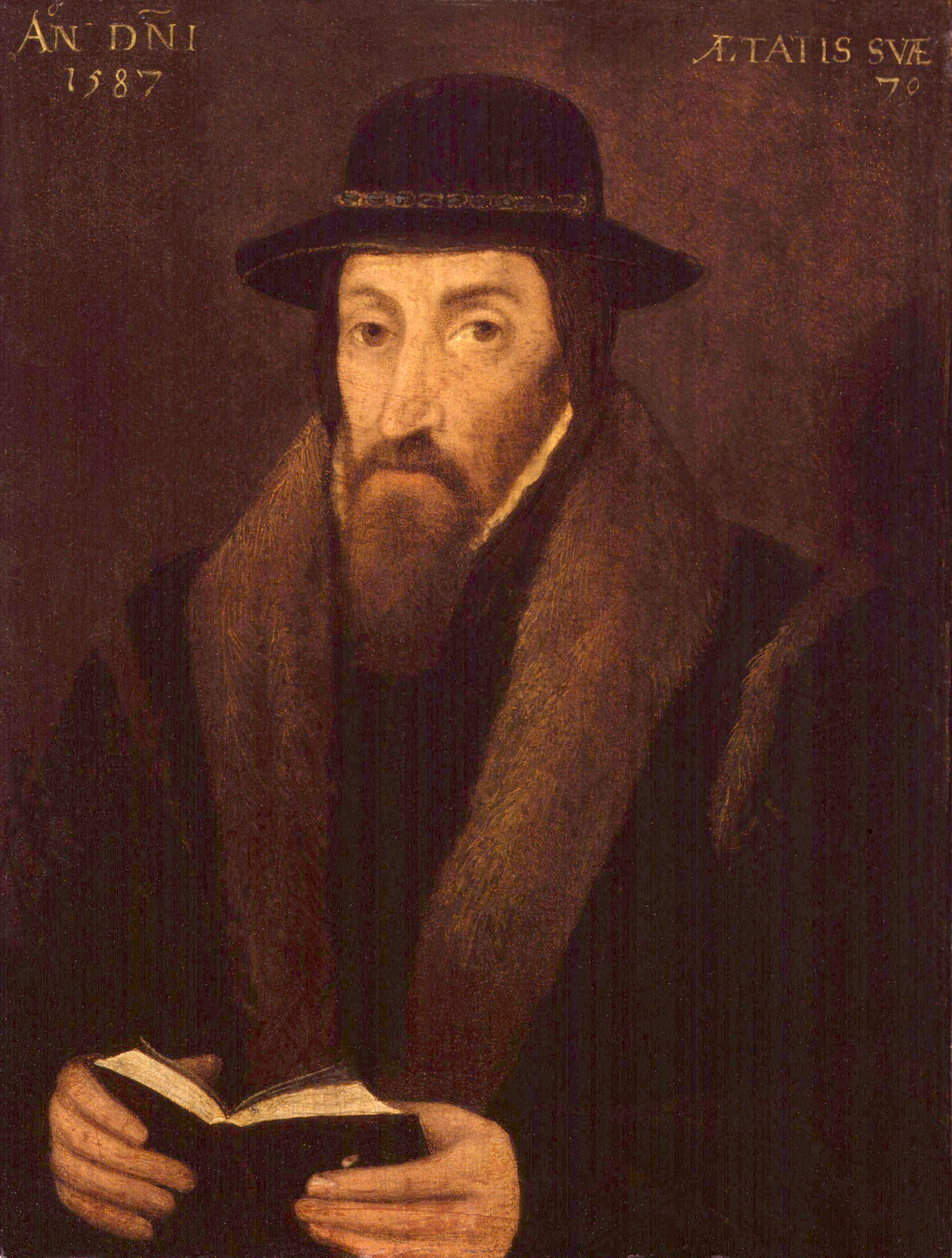
- 1587 portrait
- Born: 1516/1517; Boston, Lincolnshire, England
- Died: 18 April 1587; London, England
- Occupations: Clergyman, author
- Writing career
- Genre: Church history
- Movement: Puritan

John Foxe (1516/1517 – 18 April 1587) was an English clergyman, theologian, and historian, notable for his martyrology Foxe's Book of Martyrs, telling of Christian martyrs throughout Western history, but particularly the sufferings of English Protestants and "proto-Protestants" from the 14th century and in the reign of Mary I. The book was widely owned and read by English Puritans and helped to mould British opinion on the Catholic Church for several centuries.

== Education ==
Foxe was born in Boston, Lincolnshire, England, of a middlingly prominent family and seems to have been an unusually studious and devout child. In about 1534, when he was about 16, he entered Brasenose College, Oxford, where he was the pupil of John Hawarden (or Harding), a fellow of the college. In 1535 Foxe was admitted to Magdalen College School, where he may either have been improving his Latin or acting as a junior instructor. He became a probationer fellow in July 1538 and a full fellow the following July.

Foxe took his bachelor's degree on 17 July 1537, his master's degree in July 1543, and was lecturer in logic in 1539–1540. A series of letters in Foxe's handwriting dated to 1544–45, shows Foxe to be "a man of friendly disposition and warm sympathies, deeply religious, an ardent student, zealous in making acquaintance with scholars." By the time he was twenty-five, he had read the Latin and Greek fathers, the schoolmen, the canon law, and had "acquired no mean skill in the Hebrew language."

== Resignation from Oxford ==
Foxe resigned from his college in 1545 after becoming a Protestant and thereby subscribing to beliefs condemned by the Church of England under Henry VIII. After a year of "obligatory regency" (public lecturing), Foxe would have been obliged to take holy orders by Michaelmas 1545, and the primary reason for his resignation was probably his opposition to clerical celibacy, which he described in letters to friends as self-castration. Foxe may have been forced from the college in a general purge of its Protestant members although college records state that he resigned of his own accord and "ex honesta causa". Foxe's change of religious opinion may have temporarily broken his relationship with his stepfather and even have put his life in danger. Foxe personally witnessed the burning of William Cowbridge in September 1538.

After being forced to abandon what might have been a promising academic career, Foxe experienced a period of dire need. Hugh Latimer invited Foxe to live with him, but Foxe eventually became a tutor in the household of Thomas Lucy of Charlecote, near Stratford-on-Avon. Before leaving the Lucys, Foxe married Agnes Randall on 3 February 1547. They had six children.

== London under Edward VI ==
Foxe's prospects, and those of the Protestant cause generally, improved after the accession of Edward VI in January 1547 and the formation of a Privy Council dominated by pro-reform Protestants. In the middle of, or at the end of 1547 Foxe moved to London and probably lived in Stepney. There he completed three translations of Protestant sermons published by the "stout Protestant" Hugh Singleton. During this period Foxe also found a patron in Mary Fitzroy, Duchess of Richmond, who employed him as tutor to the children of her brother, Henry Howard, Earl of Surrey, a Roman Catholic who had been executed for treason in January 1547. The children were Thomas, who would become the fourth duke of Norfolk and a valuable friend of Foxe; Jane, later Countess of Westmorland, and Henry, later earl of Northampton. The duchess was the widow of Henry VIII's illegitimate son Henry FitzRoy and in that sense was the sister-in-law of the new king. Foxe lived in the duchess's London household at Mountjoy House and later at Reigate Castle, and her patronage "facilitated Foxe's entry into the ranks of England's Protestant elite." During his stay at Reigate, Foxe helped suppress a cult that had arisen around the shrine of the Virgin Mary at Ouldsworth, which had been credited with miraculous healing powers. On another occasion he took the children under his care on a trip to Dorset, where he went on board a pirate ship anchored at West Lulworth and kept a valuable parcel of red and black velvet in safe-keeping for the ship's captain.

Foxe was ordained deacon by Nicholas Ridley on 24 June 1550. His circle of friends, associates, and supporters came to include John Hooper, William Turner, John Rogers, William Cecil, and most importantly John Bale, who was to become a close friend and "certainly encouraged, very probably guided, Foxe in the composition of his first martyrology." From 1548 to 1551, Foxe brought out one tract opposing the death penalty for adultery and another supporting ecclesiastical excommunication of those who he thought "veiled ambition under the cloak of Protestantism." He also worked unsuccessfully to prevent two burnings for religion that occurred during the reign of Edward VI.

== Marian exile ==
On the accession of Mary I in July 1553, Foxe lost his tutorship when the children's grandfather, the Duke of Norfolk was released from prison. Foxe walked warily as befitted one who had published Protestant books in his own name. As the political climate worsened, Foxe believed himself personally threatened by Bishop Stephen Gardiner. Just ahead of officers sent to arrest him, he sailed with his pregnant wife from Ipswich to Nieuwpoort. He then travelled to Antwerp, Rotterdam, Frankfurt and Strasbourg, which he reached by July 1554. In Strasbourg, Foxe published a Latin history of the Christian persecutions, the draft of which he had brought from England and according to Encyclopedia Britannica, "formed the first outline of the Actes and Monuments." The final publication would then help shape the depiction and legend of Mary I as "Bloody Mary".

In the autumn of 1554, Foxe moved to Frankfurt, where he served as a preacher for the English church ministering to refugees in the city. There he was unwillingly drawn into a bitter theological controversy. One faction favoured the church polity and liturgy of the Book of Common Prayer, while the other advocated the Reformed models promoted by John Calvin's Genevan church. The latter group, led by John Knox, was supported by Foxe; the former was led by Richard Cox. Eventually Knox, who seems to have acted with more magnanimity, was expelled, and in the autumn of 1555, Foxe and about twenty others also left Frankfurt. Although Foxe clearly favoured Knox, he was irenic by temperament and expressed his disgust at "the violence of the warring factions".

Moving to Basel, Foxe worked with his fellow countrymen John Bale and Lawrence Humphrey at the drudgery of proofreading. (Educated Englishmen were noted for their learning, industry and honesty and "would also be the last persons to quarrel with their bread and butter." No knowledge of German or French was required because the English tended to socialise with one another and could communicate with scholars in Latin.) Foxe also completed and had printed a religious drama, Christus Triumphans (1556), in Latin verse. Yet despite receiving occasional financial contributions from English merchants on the continent, Foxe seems to have lived very close to the margin and been "wretchedly poor."

When Foxe received reports from England about the ongoing religious persecution there, he wrote a pamphlet urging the English nobility to use their influence with the queen to halt it. Foxe feared that the appeal would be useless, and his fears proved correct. When Knox attacked Mary Stuart in his now famous The First Blast of the Trumpet Against the Monstrous Regiment of Women, Foxe apparently criticized Knox's "rude vehemency" although their friendship seems to have remained unimpaired.

== Return to England ==
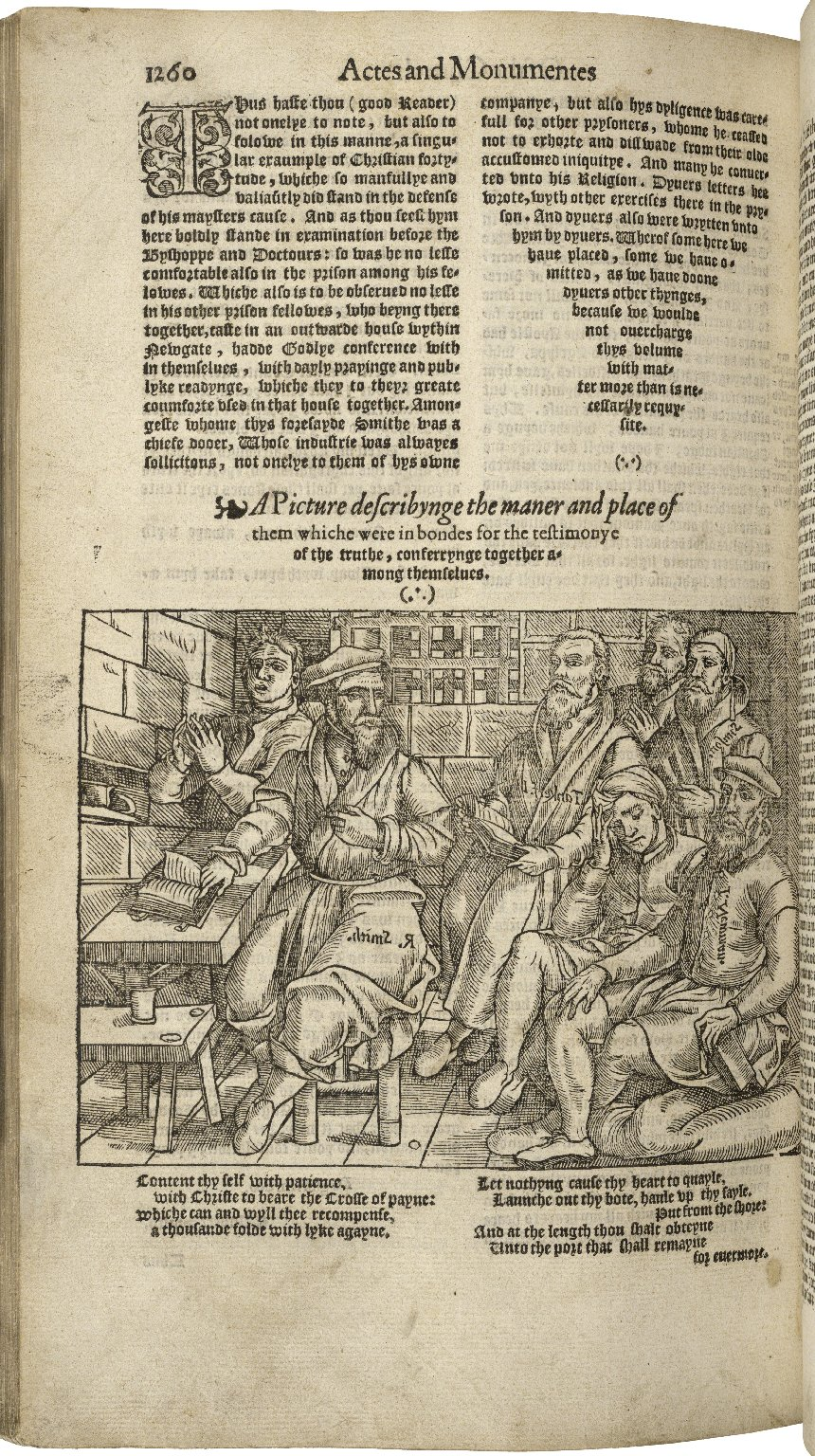
A page from the first edition of Actes and Monuments, also known as Foxe's Book of Martyrs, published in 1563.

After the death of Mary I in 1558, Foxe was in no hurry to return home, and he waited to see if religious changes instituted by her successor, Elizabeth I, would take root. Foxe was also so poor that he was unable to travel with his family until money was sent to him. Back in England, he seems to have lived for ten years at Aldgate, London, in the house of his former pupil, Thomas Howard, now Fourth Duke of Norfolk. Foxe quickly became associated with John Day the printer and published works of religious controversy while working on a new martyrology that would eventually become the Actes and Monuments.

Foxe was ordained a priest by his friend Edmund Grindal, now Bishop of London, but he "was something of a puritan, and like many of the exiles, had scruples about wearing the clerical vestments laid down in the queen's injunctions of 1559." Many of his friends eventually conformed, but Foxe was "more stubborn or single-minded." Some tried to find him preferments in the new regime, but it "was not easy to help a man of so singularly unworldly a nature, who scorned to use his powerful friendships to advance himself."

== Actes and Monuments ==
=== Latin editions ===
Foxe began his Book of Martyrs in 1552, during the reign of Edward VI, with the Marian Persecutions still in the future. In 1554, while still in exile, Foxe published in Latin at Strasbourg the first shadow of his great book, emphasising the persecution of the English Lollards during the 15th century.

As word of the contemporary English persecution made its way to the continent, Foxe began to collect materials to continue his story to the present. He published the first true Latin edition of his famous book at Basel in August 1559. Of course, it was difficult to write contemporary English history while living (as he later said) "in the far parts of Germany, where few friends, no conference, [and] small information could be had." But Foxe, who had left England poor and unknown, returned only poor. He had gained "a substantial reputation" through his Latin work.

=== First edition ===
On 20 March 1563, Foxe published the first English edition of the Actes and Monuments from the press of John Day. It was a "gigantic folio volume" of about 1800 pages, about three times the length of the 1559 Latin book. As is typical for the period, the full title was a paragraph long and is abbreviated by scholars as Acts and Monuments, although the book was popularly known then, as it is now, as Foxe's Book of Martyrs. Publication of the book made Foxe instantly famous – "England's first literary celebrity" – although because there were then no royalties, Foxe remained as poor as ever although the book sold for more than ten shillings, three weeks' pay for a skilled craftsman. This publication would then go on to become the second most popular book written in English, after the Bible.

=== Second edition ===
Actes and Monuments was immediately attacked by Catholics such as Thomas Harding, Thomas Stapleton, and Nicholas Harpsfield. In the next generation, Robert Parsons, an English Jesuit, also struck at Foxe in A Treatise of Three Conversions of England (1603–04). Harding, in the spirit of the age, called Actes and Monuments '"that huge dunghill of your stinking martyrs," full of a thousand lies'.

Intending to strengthen his book against his critics, and being flooded by new material brought to light by the publication of the first edition, Foxe put together a second edition in 1570 and where the charges of his critics had been reasonably accurate, Foxe removed the offending passages. Where he could rebut the charges, "he mounted a vigorous counter-attack, seeking to crush his opponent under piles of documents." Even though he deleted material that had been included in the first edition, the second edition was nearly double the size of the first, "two gigantic folio volumes, with 2300 very large pages" of double-columned text.

The edition was well received by the English church, and the upper house of the convocation of Canterbury meeting in 1571, ordered that a copy of the Bishop's Bible and "that full history entitled Monuments of Martyrs" be installed in every cathedral church and that church officials place copies in their houses for the use of servants and visitors. The decision was of certain benefit to Foxe's printer Day because he had taken great financial risks printing such a mammoth work.

=== Third and fourth editions ===
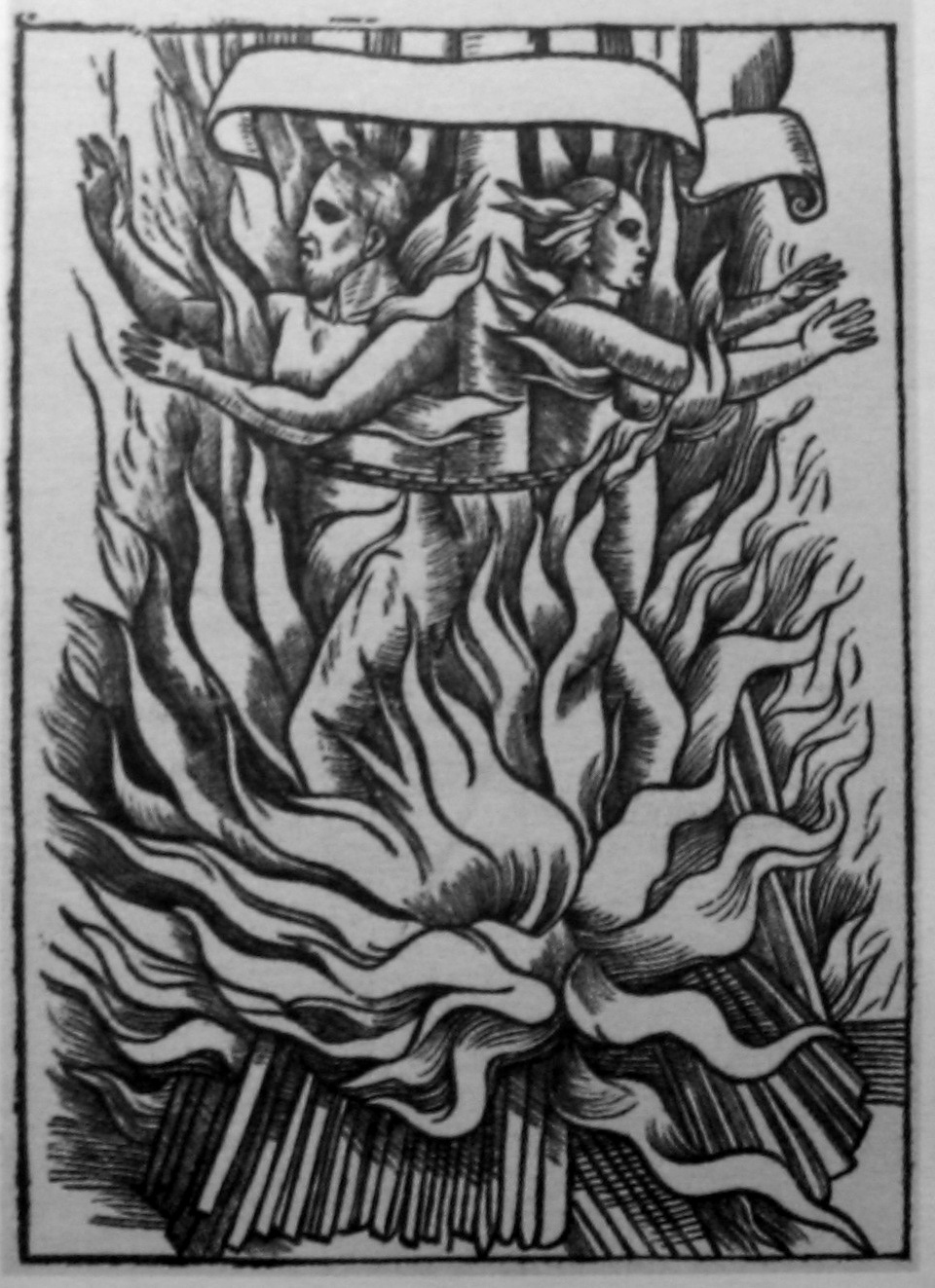
Dual martyrdom by burning, 1558; from a 1641 edition of Foxe.

Foxe published a third edition in 1576, but it was virtually a reprint of the second, although printed on inferior paper and in smaller type. The fourth edition, published in 1583, the last in Foxe's lifetime, had larger type and better paper and consisted of "two volumes of about two thousand folio pages in double columns." Nearly four times the length of the Bible, the fourth edition was "the most physically imposing, complicated, and technically demanding English book of its era. It seems safe to say that it is the largest and most complicated book to appear during the first two or three centuries of English printing history." The title page included the poignant request that the author "desireth thee, good reader, to help him with thy prayer."

=== Accuracy ===
Foxe based his accounts of martyrs before the early modern period on previous writers, including Eusebius, Bede, Matthew Paris, and many others. Foxe's own contribution was his compilation of the English martyrs from the period of the Lollards through the persecution of Mary I. Here Foxe had primary sources of all kinds to draw on: episcopal registers, reports of trials, and the testimony of eyewitnesses, a remarkable range of sources for English historical writing of the period. All this contributed to reinforcing the "English association of Catholicism with bigotry and cruelty".

Foxe's material is more accurate when he deals with his own period, although it is selectively presented, and the book is not an impartial account. Sometimes Foxe copied documents verbatim; sometimes he adapted them to his own use. Foxe's method of using his sources "proclaims the honest man, the sincere seeker after truth."

Foxe often treated his material casually, and any reader "must be prepared to meet plenty of small errors and inconsistencies." Furthermore, Foxe did not hold to later notions of neutrality or objectivity. He made unambiguous side glosses on his text, such as "Mark the apish pageants of these popelings" and "This answer smelleth of forging and crafty packing", as Foxe's age was one of strong language as well as of cruel deeds. The 1911 Encyclopædia Britannica went so far as to accuse Foxe of "wilful falsification of evidence." Nevertheless, Foxe is "factually detailed and preserves much firsthand material on the English Reformation unobtainable elsewhere." According to J. F. Mozley, Foxe presented "lifelike and vivid pictures of the manners and feelings of the day, full of details that could never have been invented by a forger."

In some cases, Foxe's reports were denied with incredulity by Catholic commentators: for example, Foxe claimed that seven people were burnt for teaching their children the Pater Noster, Creed and Ten Commandments in English. Contemporary Jesuit Robert Parsons wrote "Who will believe this monstrous tale [... this] fiction that we (Catholics) hold reading of scriptures in English [...] as heresy?"

== Life under Elizabeth I ==
=== Salisbury and London ===
Foxe had dedicated Acts and Monuments to the queen, and on 22 May 1563, he was appointed prebend of Shipton in Salisbury Cathedral, in recognition of his championship of the English church. Foxe never visited the cathedral or performed any duties associated with the position except to appoint a vicar, William Masters, a highly educated fellow Protestant and former Marian exile. Foxe's inaction as a canon of the cathedral led him to him being declared contumacious, and he was charged with failing to give a tithe for repairs to the cathedral. Perhaps his poverty made him unwilling to spare the time or money to make visits or contributions. In any case, he retained the position until his death.

By 1565, Foxe had been caught up in the vestments controversy led at that time by his associate Crowley. Foxe's name was on a list of "godly preachers which have utterly forsaken Antichrist and all his Romish rags" that was presented to Lord Robert Dudley some time between 1561 and 1564. He was also one of the twenty clergymen who on 20 March 1565 petitioned to be allowed to choose not to wear vestments; but unlike many of the others, Foxe did not have a London benefice to lose when Archbishop Parker enforced conformity. Rather, when Crowley lost his position at St Giles-without-Cripplegate, Foxe may have preached in his stead.

At some point before 1569, Foxe left Norfolk's house and moved to his own on Grub Street. Perhaps his move was motivated by his concerns about Norfolk's exceptionally poor judgment in attempting to marry Mary Stuart, which led to his imprisonment in the Tower in 1569 and his condemnation in 1572 following the Ridolfi Plot. Although Foxe had written Norfolk "a remarkably frank letter" about the injudiciousness of his course, after Norfolk's condemnation, he and Alexander Nowell ministered to the prisoner until his execution, which Foxe attended, on 2 June 1572.

In 1570, at the request of Edmund Grindal, Bishop of London, Foxe preached the Good Friday sermon at Paul's Cross. This lofty exposition of the Protestant doctrine of redemption and attack on the doctrinal errors of the Roman Catholic Church was enlarged and published that year as A Sermon of Christ Crucified. Another sermon Foxe preached seven years later at Paul's Cross resulted in his denunciation to the Queen by the French ambassador on grounds that Foxe had advocated the right of the Huguenots to take arms against their king. Foxe replied that he had been misunderstood: he had argued only that if the French king permitted no foreign power (the Pope) to rule over him, the French Protestants would immediately lay down their arms.

In 1571, Foxe edited an edition of the Anglo-Saxon gospels, in parallel with the Bishops' Bible translation, under the patronage of Archbishop Parker, who was interested in Anglo-Saxon and whose chaplain, John Jocelyn was an Anglo-Saxon scholar. Foxe's introduction argues that the vernacular scripture was an ancient custom in England.

=== Death and legacy ===
Foxe died on 18 April 1587 and was buried at St. Giles's, Cripplegate. His widow, Agnes, probably died in 1605. Foxe's son, Samuel Foxe (1560–1630) prospered after his father's death and "accumulated a substantial estate." Fortunately for posterity, he also preserved his father's manuscripts, and they are now in the British Library.

== Personality ==
Foxe was so bookish that he ruined his health by his persistent study. Yet he had "a genius for friendship," served as a spiritual counselor and was a man of private charity. He even took part in matchmaking. Foxe was so well known as a man of prayer that Francis Drake credited his victory at Cádiz in part to Foxe's praying. Furthermore, Foxe's extreme unworldliness caused others to claim that he had prophetic powers and could heal the sick.

Certainly, Foxe had a hatred of cruelty in advance of his age. When a number of Flemish Anabaptists were taken by Elizabeth's government in 1572 and sentenced to be burnt, Foxe first wrote letters to the Queen and her council asking for their lives and then wrote to the prisoners themselves (having his Latin draft translated into Flemish) pleading with them to abandon what he considered their theological errors. Foxe even visited the Anabaptists in prison. (The attempted intercession was in vain; two were burnt at Smithfield "in great horror with roaring and crying.")

John Day's son Richard, who knew Foxe well, described him in 1607 as an "excellent man … exceeding laborious in his pen … his learning inferior to none of his age and time; for his integrity of life a bright light to as many as knew him, beheld him, and lived with him" Foxe's funeral was accompanied "by crowds of mourners".

== Historical reputation ==
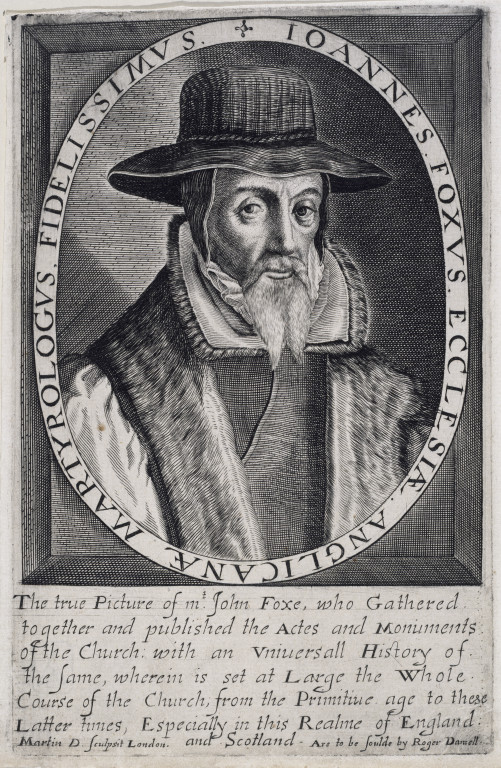
Foxe, engraving by Martin Droeshout

After his death, Foxe's Acts and Monuments continued to be published and appreciatively read. John Burrow refers to it as, after the Bible, "the greatest single influence on English Protestant thinking of the late Tudor and early Stuart period."

By the end of the 17th century, however, the work tended to be abbreviated to include only "the most sensational episodes of torture and death", thus giving to Foxe's work "a lurid quality which was certainly far from the author's intention." Because Foxe was used to attack Catholicism and a rising tide of high-church Anglicanism, the book's credibility was challenged in the early 19th century by a number of authors, most importantly, Samuel R. Maitland. In the words of one Catholic Victorian, after Maitland's critique, "no one with any literary pretensions … ventured to quote Foxe as an authority." Further analysis of Maitland's criticism in the 21st century has in the words of David Loades, that Maitland "deserves to be treated with genuine, but limited, respect. His demolition of the martyrologist's history of the Waldenses, and of some of his other medieval reconstructions, was accurate up to a point, but he never addressed those parts of the Acts and Monuments where Foxe was at his strongest, and his general conclusion that the work was nothing but a tissue of fabrications and distortions is not supported by modern analysis."

It was not until J. F. Mozley published John Foxe and His Book, in 1940, that Foxe's rehabilitation as a historian began, initiating a controversy that has continued to the present. Recent renewed interest in Foxe as a seminal figure in early modern studies created a demand for a new critical edition of the Actes and Monuments: Foxe's Book of Martyrs Variorum Edition.

In the words of Thomas S. Freeman, one of the most important living Foxe scholars, "current scholarship has formed a more complex and nuanced estimate of the accuracy of Acts and Monuments … Perhaps [Foxe] may be most profitably seen in the same light as a barrister pleading a case for a client he knows to be innocent and whom he is determined to save. Like the hypothetical barrister, Foxe had to deal with the evidence of what actually happened, evidence that he was rarely in a position to forge. But he would not present facts damaging to his client, and he had the skills that enabled him to arrange the evidence so as to make it conform to what he wanted it to say. Like the barrister, Foxe presents crucial evidence and tells one side of a story which must be heard. But he should never be read uncritically, and his partisan objectives should always be kept in mind."

== See also ==
- Jean Crespin
- John Foxe's apocalyptic thought
- Religion in the United Kingdom
