= The First Blast of the Trumpet Against the Monstruous Regiment of Women =

Book by John Knox

The First Blast of the Trumpet Against the Monstrous Regiment of Women
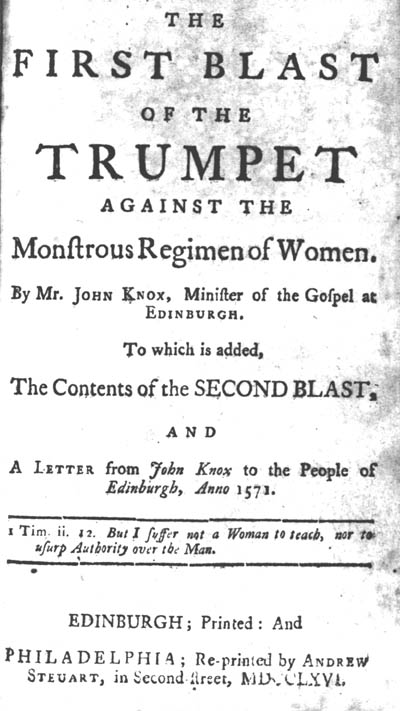
- Title page of a 1766 edition
- Author: John Knox (first published anonymously)
- Language: Early Modern English
- Genre: Pamphlet; Anti-feminism
- Publisher: J. Poullain and A. Rebul
- Publication date: 1558
- Publication place: Switzerland
- Dewey Decimal: 285.241
- LC Class: BX9421 K56

The First Blast of the Trumpet Against the Monstruous Regiment of Women is a polemical work by the Scottish reformer John Knox, published in 1558. It attacks female monarchs, arguing that rule by women is contrary to the Bible.

== Title ==
Two archaic terms are in the title: monstruous is from Latin mōnstruōsus and means "unnatural, misshapen, grotesque," similar to modern "monstrous;" many later editions change the word to "Monstrous." The term "regiment of women" does not refer to a military-style regiment of women, but means "rule by women" (Late Latin regimentum, "direction for government").

== Historical context ==
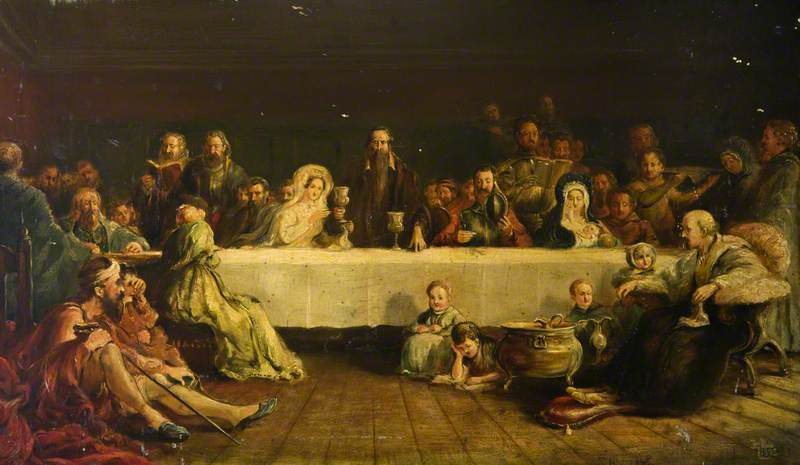
Depiction of Knox dispensing the sacrament at Calder House, Linlithgowshire in 1556. (Painting by Thomas Hutchison Peddie, 1895)

John Knox was a Scottish Protestant preacher and notary born in 1514 who was involved in some of the most contentious religious and political debates of the day. Exiled from Scotland for his evangelism by the Catholic government of Mary of Guise (mother of and regent for the child monarch Mary, Queen of Scots), he was allowed to preach in Northern England starting in 1549, which at the time was under the Protestant regime of King Edward VI. His preaching built Knox a congregation of followers who stayed loyal to him even after he had to flee to the Continent after the accession of the Catholic Mary Tudor to the English and Irish thrones. Knox believed that he was an authority on religious doctrine and frequently described himself as "watchman", drawing similarities between his life and that of Jeremiah, Ezekiel, Jehu and Daniel. He saw his duty as to "blow his master's trumpet". But his views were not popular with Mary Tudor, the new Catholic monarch, so in 1554 Knox fled to mainland Europe.

At the time, Scotland, Ireland and England were governed by queens regnant, both of them Catholic. While in Europe, Knox discussed this question of gynarchy with John Calvin and Heinrich Bullinger. Knox believed that gynarchy was contrary to the natural order of things, although Calvin and Bullinger believed it was acceptable for women to be rulers when the situation demanded.

While in Europe, Knox was summoned back to Scotland to a hearing to be tried for heresy. However Mary, Queen of Scots cancelled the hearing and in 1557, he was invited back to Scotland to resume his preaching. Upon his arrival at Dieppe he learned that the invitation had been cancelled. While waiting in Dieppe, the frustrated Knox anonymously wrote The First Blast of the Trumpet Against the Monstruous Regiment of Women. Unlike his other publications, Knox published the final version of The First Blast without consulting his exiled congregation and in 1558 he published it with the help of Jean Crespin.

== Content ==
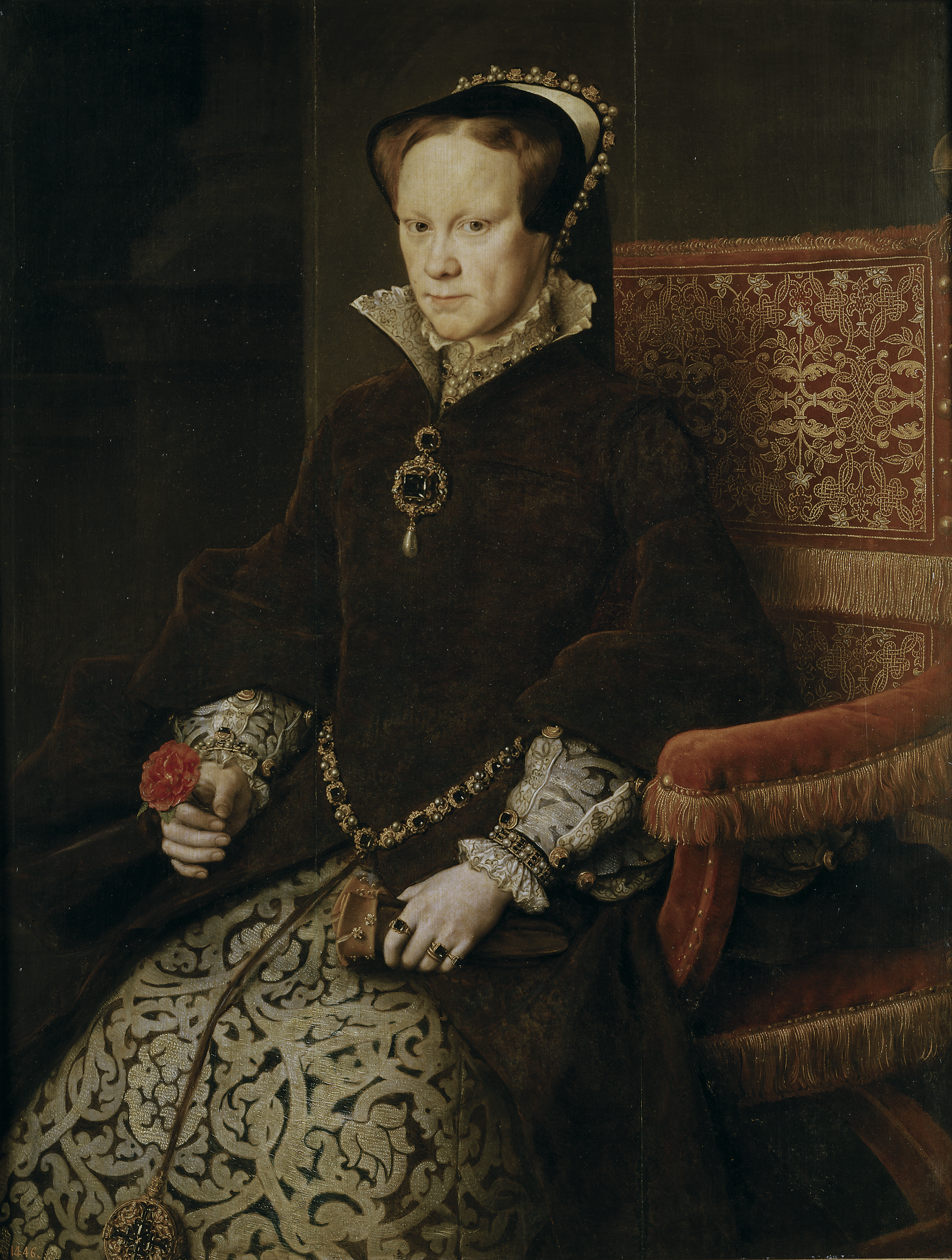
Mary I, Queen of England and Ireland

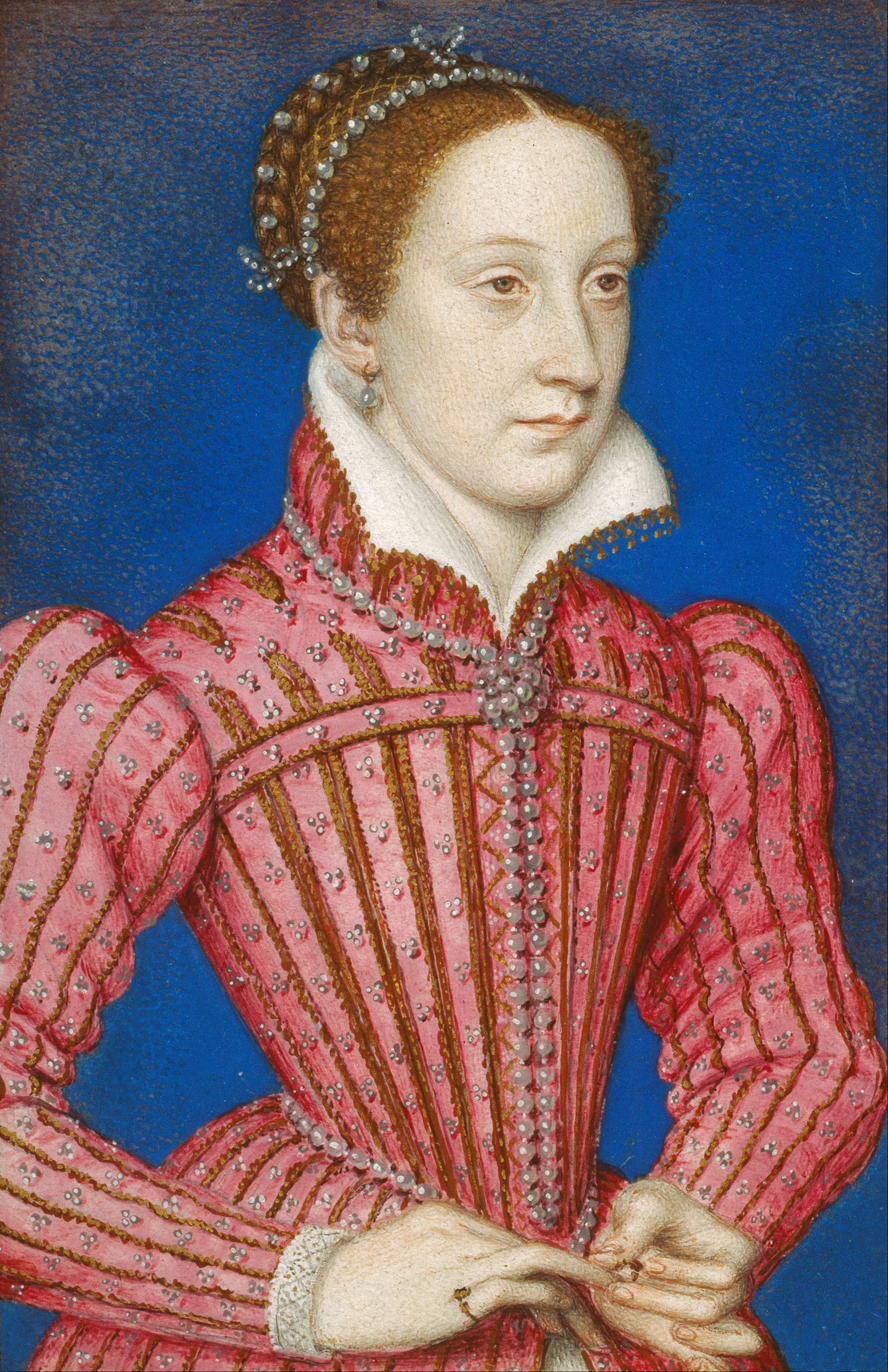
Mary, Queen of Scots

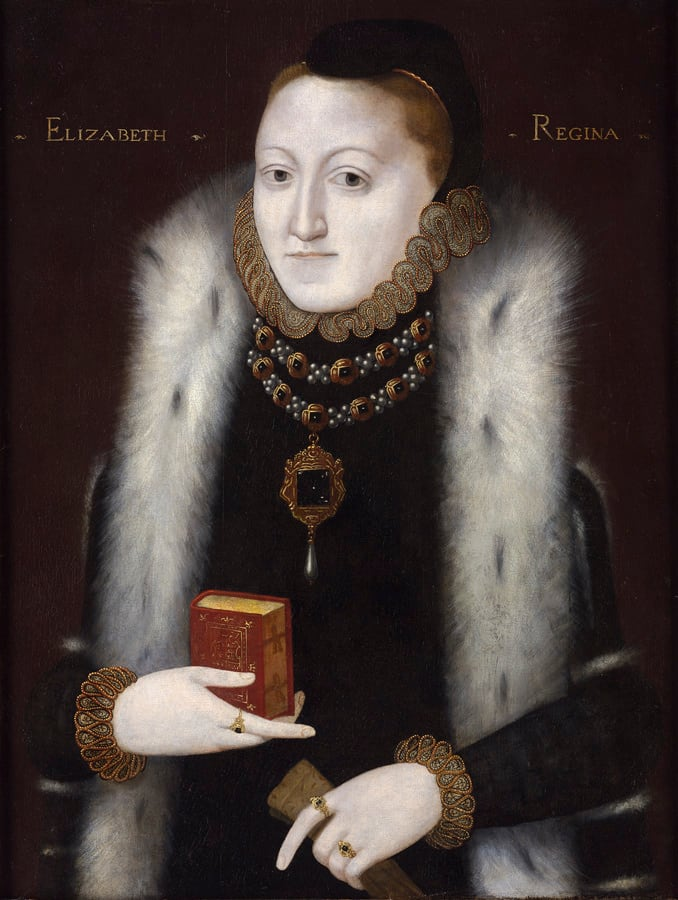
Elizabeth I, Queen of England and Ireland

The three queens of 1558

The bulk of The First Blast contained Knox's counterarguments to Calvin's viewpoints on gynarchy that they had discussed previously. While discussing gynarchy in general, Knox's target was mainly Mary, Queen of England and Ireland.

Knox, a staunch Protestant Reformer, opposed the Catholic queens on religious grounds, and used them as examples to argue against female rule over men generally. Building on his premise that, according to Knox's understanding of the Bible, "God, by the order of his creation, has [deprived] woman of authority and dominion" and from history that "man has seen, proved, and pronounced just causes why it should be", he argued the following with regard to the specific role of women bearing authority:

For who can denie but it repugneth to nature, that the blind shal be appointed to leade and conduct such as do see? That the weake, the sicke, and impotent persones shall norishe and kepe the hole and strong, and finallie, that the foolishe, madde and phrenetike shal gouerne the discrete, and giue counsel to such as be sober of mind? And such be al women, compared vnto man in bearing of authoritie. For their sight in ciuile regiment, is but blindnes: their strength, weaknes: their counsel, foolishenes: and judgement, phrenesie, if it be rightlie considered.

Knox had three primary sections in The First Blast. First, that gynarchy was "'repugnant to Nature'; second, 'a contumlie to God'; and finally, 'the subversion of good order'".

Knox believed that when a female ruled in society, it went against the natural order of things. He further went on to say that it was a virtue from God for women to serve men. Knox thought that civil obedience was a prerequisite for heaven and Mary was not in line with the civil obedience. Although there were exceptions to this order, Knox believed that God was the only one who could make those exceptions.

Knox appealed to the common belief that women were supposed to come after men because Eve came after (and from) Adam. Furthermore, God's anger against Eve for taking the forbidden fruit had continued and all women were therefore punished by being subjected to men.

In his analysis of the Creation, Knox furthered his argument by stating that women were created in the image of God "only with respect to creatures, not with respect to man". Knox believed that men were a superior reflection of God and women were an inferior reflection.

The First Blast contained four main counterarguments to John Calvin's arguments. First, Knox argued that while God had given authority to biblical female leaders, Deborah (judge of pre-monarchic Israel) and Huldah (a prophetess), God had not given that authority to any female in the 16th century AD. Elaborating, Knox stated that the only similarity Queen Mary had with Deborah and Huldah was their gender. This was not sufficient to Knox. Furthermore, Deborah and Huldah did not claim the right to pass on their authority, but the queens did.

One of Calvin's arguments was that gynarchy was acceptable since Moses had sanctioned the daughters of Zelophehad to receive an inheritance. Knox refuted this second point in The First Blast by pointing out that receiving an inheritance was not equivalent to gaining a civil office. The daughters were also required to marry within their tribe while Mary I had married Philip II of Spain.

Calvin had told Knox that Mary I's rule was sanctioned because Parliament and the general public had agreed to it. Knox countered this in The First Blast by stating that it did not matter if man agreed to the rule if God did not agree to it as well.

The fourth point that Knox disagreed with Calvin on was accepting of gynarchy because it was a national custom. Knox conversely believed that Biblical authority and God's will made Calvin's argument invalid.

The First Blast concluded by using a biblical metaphor to call the nobility to action and remove the queen from the throne. In the Bible, Jehoiada, representing Knox, had instructed the rulers of the people to depose Athaliah, who represented Mary I. The Jews then executed the high priest of Baal, who represented Stephen Gardiner. It was clear that Knox was calling for the removal of Queen Mary I. He may have even been demanding that she be executed.

While many Christians in the 16th century believed it was their Christian duty to always follow their monarch, Knox believed it was worse for a Christian to follow a ruler that was evil. He claimed that, if needed, a rebellion should take place to dethrone her. Many people in Scotland agreed with Knox that it was not natural for women to rule but they did not agree with his belief that the queens should be replaced. Because of Knox's bold call to action, his contemporaries began to consider Knox as a revolutionary.

== Aftereffects ==
Soon after publishing The First Blast, Knox continued to write fervently. Prior to August 1558, he wrote three items which supplemented The First Blast. He wrote to Mary of Guise to compel her to support Protestantism and to convince her to let him regain his right to preach. He wrote to the nobility to convince them of their duty to rise up against the queen. And he wrote to the people of Scotland to convince them of the need for reform.

Knox intended to write a Second Blast and a Third Blast, but after seeing how people responded to the First, neither ever became reality.

His polemic against female rulers had negative consequences for him when Elizabeth I succeeded her half-sister Mary I as Queen of England and Ireland; Elizabeth was a supporter of the Protestant cause, but took offence at Knox's words about female sovereigns. Her opposition to him personally became an obstacle to Knox's direct involvement with the Protestant cause in England after 1559. She blamed him and the city of Geneva for permitting The First Blast to be published. Members of the Genevan congregation were searched, persecuted, and exiled. In 1558, the queen prohibited "importing of heretical and seditious books" into England. After Knox revealed himself as the author of The First Blast, through a letter to the queen, he was refused entrance to England. Despite Knox's efforts to keep the blame for The First Blast on himself, his followers and other Protestants were punished.

In a letter to Anna Locke on 6 April 1569, John Knox said, "To me it is written that my First Blast hath blown from me all my friends in England." Knox ended his letter, though, by saying that he stood by what he had said. Through it all, Knox continued to see himself as a prophet and believe that he needed to still declare God's words.

When Mary of Guise died in 1560, Knox wrote that Mary's unpleasant death and the deaths of her sons and husband were a divine judgement that would have been prevented if she had listened to the words in The First Blast.

== Knox's contemporaries ==
Knox was not the only person to write against gynarchy. Two other main publications were also written, one by Christopher Goodman and the other by Anthony Gilby. Unlike Knox whose argument hinged on the premise of gender, Gilby and Goodman's arguments were rooted in Mary I being a Catholic. Others individuals including Jean Bodin, George Buchanan, Francois Hotman, and Montaigne also agreed with Knox, but their works were less known.

Goodman relied on some of Knox's ideas in his publication "How Superior Powers Oght to be Obeyd". He agreed that female rule was against God's will and natural law. After the publication of Goodman's and Knox works, their friendship increased. But, while Goodman eventually rescinded his words about women rulers, Knox never did.

On the other hand, many of Knox's contemporaries disagreed with his stance. In response to The First Blast, John Aylmer, an exiled English Protestant, wrote then published "An Harborowe for Faithful and Trewe Subjectes Agaynst the Late Blowne Blaste, Concerninge the Government of Wemen" on 26 April 1559. While Knox believed that the Bible held absolute authority on everything, including politics, Alymer disagreed. He believed that the narratives in the Bible were not always God's way of explaining right and wrong but were sometimes historical expositions only. Aylmer also argued that what Knox called "monstrous" was actually just "uncommon". This was portrayed by pointing out that although it was uncommon for a woman to give birth to twins, it was not monstrous.

Matthew Parker, John Foxe, Laurence Humphrey, Edmund Spenser, and John Lesley also opposed Knox's views in The First Blast and John Calvin and Theodore Beza banned it from being sold.

== Later academic assessment ==
Despite his polemic against gynarchy in The First Blast, some modern scholars of Knox have defended him against accusations of misogyny.

As Richard Lee Greaves, a professor of history at Florida State University, said, "John Knox has gained a certain degree of notoriety in the popular mind as an antifeminist because of his attack on female sovereigns in The First Blast of the Trumpet against the Monstrous Regiment of Women (1558). Yet his attack was by no means original, for similar views were propounded in the sixteenth century by diverse writers."

Susan M. Felch, director of Calvin Center for Christian Scholarship and a professor of English, believed that Knox was not misogynistic but just passionate about maintaining the natural order of things. Felch further stated that while Knox was writing The First Blast he was writing letters to women which were "remarkably free of gendered rhetoric". Knox addressed his female friends as partners in the fight against sin. Accompanied with expressions of non-romantic love, Knox gave spiritual advice to them but also believed that women could make their own spiritual decisions and encouraged them to do so. Felch believed that Knox did not think of Mary I as a lesser being, but believed that her decision to take the throne was sinful.

Richard G. Kyle also agreed that Knox could not have been misogynistic because, besides The First Blast, Knox's writing did not deride or ridicule women.

A. Daniel Frankforter, a history professor at Penn State, pointed to times when Knox complimented women as evidence for Knox's non-misogynistic beliefs. He cited, for example, the time when Knox told his mother-in-law that she was a mirror to his soul. Frankforter also believed that while Knox's rhetoric appears "virulent" and "misogynistic", it was likely no worse than everyone else in his time.

Rosalind K. Marshall, a historian and Fellow of the Royal Society of Literature, believed that the tone in The First Blast was defensive not aggressive. She further claimed that The First Blast was not meant as an accusation against all women but just the female monarchs. Additionally, Marshall believed that Knox was in a "religious fervour" when he wrote The First Blast and would not have normally written such cruel things when he held women in such high esteem.

Jane E. Dawson, a professor of Reformation History at the University of Edinburgh, pointed out that Knox did not always have antagonism toward Mary Queen of Scots since they previously worked well together. She also agreed that the high majority of Knox's writings were uplifting instead of condemning. She contests that Knox lashed out at Mary I because he felt isolated and persecuted.

== See also ==
- Complementarianism
- Patriarcha
- Women in Christianity
