= Christopher Wade (martyr) =

English Protestant martyr (died 1555)

Christopher Wade (died 1555) was an English Protestant martyr. His story is recorded in Foxe's Book of Martyrs.

He was executed by burning in July 1555, on the same day as Margaret Polley, in Dartford, Kent. He had been condemned by Maurice Griffith, bishop of Rochester.
