= J. F. Mozley =

British historian and bishop (1887–1974)

James Frederic Mozley (23 December 1887 – 8 July 1974) was a British historian and Anglican priest.

He was educated at Exeter College, Oxford, where he studied the Literae humaniores and graduated with a BA in 1910. He trained as an Anglican priest at Lichfield Theological College and was ordained in 1913. In 1937, he published a biography of the Bible translator William Tyndale, in 1940 a study of John Foxe's Book of Martyrs and in 1953 a work on Miles Coverdale's translation of the Bible. The Bible scholar Jack P. Lewis said Mozley's work "furnished excellent treatments of the Bibles of Coverdale and Tyndale".

== Works ==
- William Tyndale (London: Society for Promoting Christian Knowledge, 1937).
- John Foxe and His Book (London: Society for Promoting Christian Knowledge, 1940) Reprinted 1970 Octagon Books New York.

Reprinted 1970 Octagon Books New York

- Coverdale and His Bibles (Lutterworth Press, 1953).
