= John Foxe's apocalyptic thought =

The English Protestant cleric John Foxe of the 16th century, known primarily if somewhat misleadingly as a martyrologist on the basis of his major work Actes and Monuments, wrote also on the interpretation of the Apocalypse, both at the beginning of his writing career in the 1550s, and right at the end of it, with his Eicasmi of 1587, the year of his death.

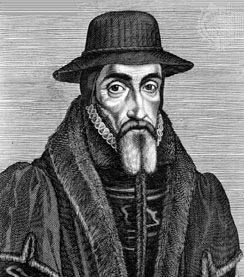
John Foxe, 1641 engraving by George Glover.

== Background ==
John Bale writing in the 1540s had identified the Protestant Church of England as an actor in the historical struggle with the "false church" of Catholicism; and backed up his views with interpretation of the Book of Revelation. The "English apocalyptic" was exceptional in the Protestant territories, with the concept of England as an "elect nation".

== Orthodoxy ==
Foxe's views became quite orthodox in the Church of England for a generation, and more: a war against Antichrist was being waged by the English people, but led by the Christian Emperor (echoing Constantine I) who was identified with Elizabeth I of England. They were then challenged within the Church of England, for example by Thomas Brightman, and from outside by John Napier in particular. Until the advent of Laudianism, the mixture of Foxe's historical support for the Church of England, including its bishops who were Marian martyrs, and his opposition to persecution, remained in the mainstream.

== Apocalyptic writings ==
Foxe's Latin drama Christus Triumphans (1556 in Basle, with a 1551 edition in London also recorded) presaged his later theory of the history of the Christian church. It was called a comœdia apocalyptica, and after 29 scenes ends on a note of anticipation and implication. The final act, of a work unfinished by design, brings the dramatisation of Revelation to the Protestant Reformation, and allegorically to the England of the time. Edmund Spenser may have drawn his own apocalyptic views and model from this work of Foxe.

The later editions of Actes and Monuments contained tables, of the numerological significance of numbers connected to the Book of Revelation, and a timeline of persecution of the Church.

== Foxe's amillennialism ==
Foxe was an "amillennial historicist"; which is not precisely the same as an amillennialist. The standard or initial position of the "English apocalyptic" was postmillennialist. Typical Tudor interpretations of the Christian millennium place it in the past; and Foxe does so. He was in the mainstream in opposing the premillennialist interpretations, typified (somewhat later) by Arthur Dent, George Gifford and John Napier. This approach of the period is not equivalent to idealism, the essentially allegorical interpretation of the Apocalypse, as current usage of terminology might imply.
