= Henry Robinson (writer) =

English merchant, writer (c. 1604–c. 1664)

Henry Robinson (c. 1604 – c. 1664) was an English merchant and writer. He is best known for a work on religious toleration, Liberty of Conscience from 1644.

== Life ==
He was educated at St John's College, Oxford, and was a freeman of the Mercers' Company. He had travelled in continental Europe as a young man. He resided and worked as a merchant in Tuscany for a period of approximately five years between 1630 and 1635. Robinson’s economic and religious thought bore the imprint of his stay in the Tuscan port city of Livorno. He was also much influenced by the Dutch example of tolerance and prosperity.

A supporter of the Independent line in religion, against the orthodox Presbyterians, he was involved in controversy with William Prynne.

In politics he with Henry Parker lent support in 1649 to Parliament in the debate over 'engagement', an oath to be required affirming the legitimacy of the Parliamentary regime. In the same year he was appointed to government administrative positions, dealing with accounts and sale of crown lands, and in 1650 with farm rents and acting as secretary to the excise commissioners.

In 1650 he set up as a business, though short-lived, an Office of Addresses and Encounters. It was in Threadneedle Street in London, and charged 6d. for answers to certain types of queries, concerning real estate and employment amongst other matters. There was a free service for the poor. The creation of such an Office had been pushed for three years by Samuel Hartlib, who had lobbied for public funds for it. Robinson was an associate of Hartlib, and provided a limited implementation of a grand reformist scheme, which drew also on the French model of Théophraste Renaudot that had operated by then for 20 years. Through the simple provision of a central Register of Addresses, Robinson argued, employers could find employees.

== Writings ==
In England, Robinson published several texts between 1643 and 1646 that were grounded in a secular, sceptical and Independent line, at a moment when there was a risk that the Presbyterian church would be established as the only state church of England to the exclusion of other denominations. He advocated the "free trading of truth", and wrote that "no man can have a natural monopoly of truth". He was one of a group of authors slightly ahead of John Milton in the arguments of Areopagitica against censorship. It has been said that there was essentially nothing in Milton's work that had not been anticipated by Robinson, William Walwyn, Roger Williams. According to recent research by David Adams, Milton’s Areopagitica was printed on a press owned by Robinson. The press also printed works advocating religious toleration by Welwyn and Williams.

Other contemporaries writing in the area of freedom of publication were John Lilburne and John Saltmarsh, and John Goodwin. The production of pamphlets in 1644 arguing for toleration was part of the Independents' campaign against the plans to establish a unified Presbyterian system of church government that would have authority over all Protestant congregations. Robinson was against religious coercion, and therefore against the setting-up of a new national church for England if the result was persecution. Toleration was apparently not to be extended to Roman Catholics.

He wrote extensively on trade and economics, including advocacy for English trade policy during the Rump Parliament, In economic policy his writings had some effect: in the areas of interest rates, naturalisation of foreigners, redistribution of trades from the London centre, and inland navigation, there was a measure of economic reform in the directions he with Hartlib had proposed.

He, in common with some of the Levellers, argued against jury trial.

== Works ==
- England's Safety, in Trades Encrease (1641)
- Liberty of Conscience: or the sole means to obtain Peace and Truth (1643)
- A Short Answer to A. S. (1645)
- Briefe Considerations, Concerning the Advancement of Trade and Navigation (1649)
- A Short Discourse between Monarchical and Aristocratical Government (1649)
- The Office of Addresses and Encounters (1650)
- Certain Proposals, to the People's Freedom and Accommodation (1652)
