= Henry Parker (writer) =

English barrister and political writer

Henry Parker (1604–1652) was an English barrister and political writer in the Parliamentarian cause.

He was a major figure as a propagandist and pamphleteer, "the most influential writer to defend the parliamentary cause in the 1640s". He provided the "ideological ballast for resistance", according to Geoffrey Robertson. He operated on behalf of the "coalition" of aristocrats and gentry who took over in the Long Parliament. He formulated a theory of sovereignty for the side of Parliament in its conflict with Charles I of England, based on the consent of the people.

== Life ==
He was born in Ratton, Sussex, where his father Sir Nicholas Parker was a justice of the peace and MP. His mother was Kathryn Temple, sister of Sir Thomas Temple, 1st Baronet, of Stowe. Thomas Parker, who represented Seaford in the Long Parliament, was his brother. His background was Winchester College, St Edmund Hall, Oxford (M.A. 1628) and Lincoln's Inn (called to the bar in 1637). He was a nephew, by marriage, and associate of William Fiennes, 1st Viscount Saye and Sele, and his early works are close to the direct political concerns of this patron. He was a cousin of the regicide, James Temple.

He was secretary to the Parliamentary Army in 1642, and secretary to the House of Commons with John Sadler in 1645. At the same time he was secretary to Robert Devereux, 3rd Earl of Essex, who emerged in 1642 in a prominent position as Parliamentary military leader. Parker's Observations upon some of his Majesty's late answers and expresses (1642) has been called the "single most influential tract of the period".

Correspondence of King Charles and Queen Henrietta Maria was captured after the royalist defeat at the Battle of Naseby in 1645. It was published, 39 letters being made public, edited and annotated by Parker, Sadler and Thomas May, as The Kings Cabinet Opened. The tactic adopted in this work of mild annotation, allowing Charles's words mostly to speak for themselves, proved itself effective.

After the death of Essex, in 1646, he took a position in Germany, as agent in Hamburg for the Merchant Adventurers. From this period dates his economic pamphlet, On a free trade, in support of mercantilism. He also became concerned with the political and military situation in Ireland. He wrote pamphlets on it, becoming on his return an apologist for Henry Ireton. From 1649 he was secretary to Oliver Cromwell's army, serving in Ireland, and is presumed to have died there.

In 1649, he with Henry Robinson argued for 'engagement', a kind of loyalty oath to be imposed by the victorious Parliamentary side to ensure recognition of its authority. He was an opponent of John Lilburne, the Leveller, and wrote in support of jury trial, a system attacked by Lilburne.

== Parker's positions and sources ==
His Discourse concerning Puritans drew on Virgilio Malvezzi and Paolo Sarpi, and attacked both episcopacy and Presbyterianism as autonomous systems. In True grounds (1641) he continued the case against independent religious institutions.

In a series of over 20 political pamphlets from 1640 onwards, he developed ad hoc but influential positions: absolute power for Parliament; thorough Erastianism on the religious question (a "cool secularist" for Christopher Hill); and an appeal to natural law, or the "law of nature" as the basis for political power. In The Case of shipmony (1640) he argued in terms of salus populi, the law of necessity, and the failure of the King's arguments to establish it. This went further than arguments simply directed against royal prerogative, and shifted the discussion of legality.

For J. G. A. Pocock, Parker is "no kind of classical republican". On the other hand the position of Observations on monarchy is that it is held "by way of trust". With Philip Hunton, Parker argued that political society has the nature of a contract, and required the consent of the people. He put the case that Parliament actually was representative of the people.

Parker's theory of sovereignty implicitly depended on Jean Bodin. As well as Bodin and Sarpi, Mendle sees Parker drawing on Richard Hooker, and Grotius.

== Royalist replies ==
Initially, the Observations of 1642 provoked replies that did not name it or engage directly with its arguments, but attacked its slogans. Two important examples were works from Dudley Digges and John Spelman, in A view of a printed book intituled Observations upon His Majesties late answers and expresses (1642). Robert Filmer in Patriarcha held up Parker's contractarian views as an artificial construct.

John Bramhall attacked both Parker and Thomas Hobbes, at different times, but using similar language. John Maxwell took Parker as a typical specimen, in Sacro-sancta regum majestas of 1644, published anonymously. He argued strongly against the concept that the king had his power through popular consent, and placed Parker in a tradition going back to William of Ockham and Marsilius of Padua.

== Influence ==
Christopher Hill states that Philip Hunton's Treatise of Monarchie (1643) is an attempted compromise between Parker and John Goodwin.

In general terms, the works of Parker, John Lilburne, Richard Overton, Isaac Penington and Henry Vane are considered the substrate for the later political theories of John Locke, James Harington and Algernon Sidney.

== Works ==
- Divine and Publike Observations (1638)
- The case of shipmony briefly discoursed (1640) online text
- The question concerning the divine right of episcopacie truly stated (1641)
- A discourse concerning Puritans. A vindication of those, who unjustly suffer by the mistake, abuse, and misapplication of that name (1641) as Philus Adelphus
- The altar dispute (1641)
- The true grounds of ecclesiasticall regiment (1641)
- An answer to Lord Digbies speech (1641)
- The Vintner's Answer to some scandalous Phamphlets (1642)
- The danger to England observed, upon its deserting the high court of Parliament (1642)
- Some few observations upon His Majesties late answer (1642)
- Observations upon some of His Majesties late answers and expresses (1642) Text
- A petition or declaration, humbly desired to be presented to the view of His most Excellent Majestie (1642)
- The manifold miseries of civill warre and discord in a kingdome (1642)
- Accommodation cordially desired and really intended (1642)
- An appendix to the late answer printed by His Majesties command (1642)
- The generall junto or The councell of union, chosen equally out of England, Scotland, and Ireland (1642)
- The Observator defended (1642)
- A question answered: how laws are to be understood, and obedience yeelded? (1642)
- Animadversions animadverted (1642)
- An appendix to the late answer printed by His Majesties command (1642)
- The Contra-Replicant, his complaint to his majestie (1643)
- A political catechism (1643)
- The Oath of Pacification (1643)
- To the High Court of Parliament: the humble remonstrance of the Company of Stationers London (1643)
- Jus populi (1644)
- Mr. William Wheelers case from his own relation (1644/5)
- The Kings cabinet opened (1645) with others
- The speech of Their Excellencies the Lords Ambassadours Extraordinary (1645)
- Jus Regum (1645)
- The Irish massacre (1646)
- The Trojan horse of the Presbyteriall government unbowelled (1646)
- An elegie upon ye death of my most noble & most honourable master Robert Earle of Essex (1646)
- Henry Parkers answer to the retreate of the armie. 24 Sept.. 1647 (1647)
- An answer to the poysonous sedicious paper of David Jenkins (1647)
- Severall poysonous and sedicious papers of Mr. David Jenkins answered (1647)
- The cordiall of Mr. D. Jenkins ... answered (1647)
- Memoriall. That in regard Mr. John Abbot register of the Prerogative Office had deserted his trust (1648)
- Of a free trade (1648)
- A letter of due censure, and redargution [sic] to Lieut: Coll: John Lilburne (1650)
- The true portraiture of the kings of England (1650)
- Reformation in courts, and cases testamentary (1650)
- Scotlands holy war (1651)
- The chief affairs of Ireland truly communicated (1651)
