= Thomas Harding (1516–1572) =

English Roman Catholic priest and controversialist

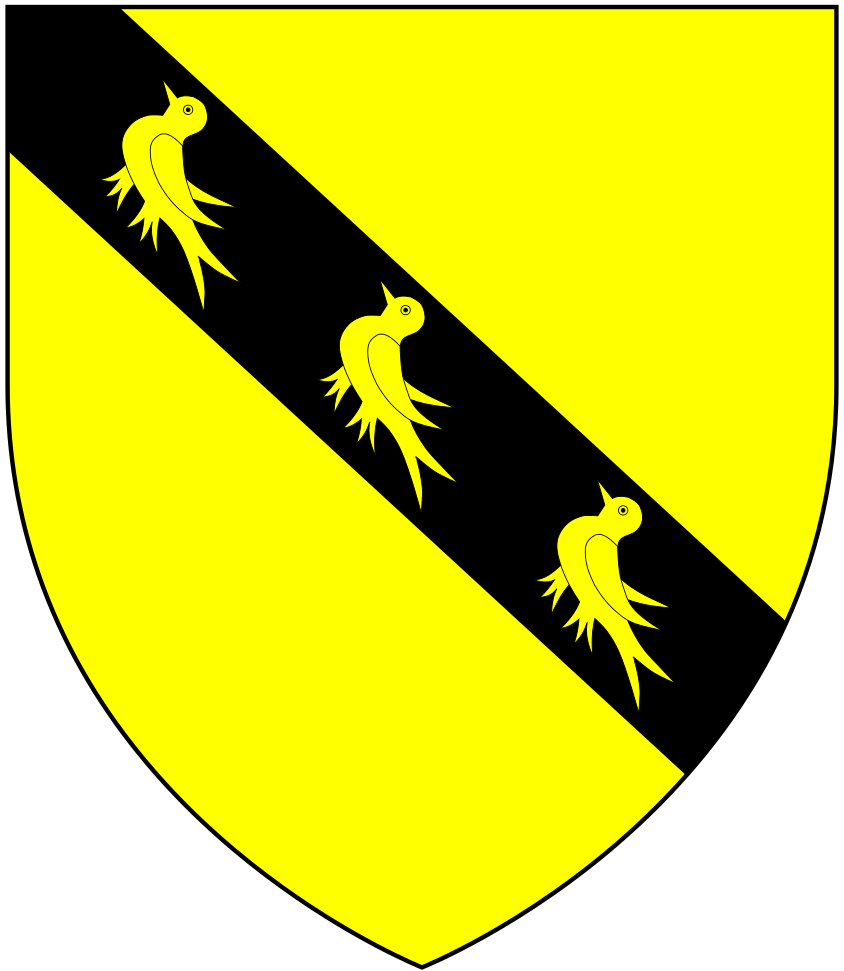
Arms of Harding: Or, on a bend sable three martlets of the field

Thomas Harding (1516 at Combe Martin, Devon – September 1572 at Leuven) was an English Roman Catholic priest and controversialist. He was one of the Worthies of Devon of the biographer John Prince (d.1723).

== Life ==
He went to New College, Oxford, in 1534, was admitted a Fellow in 1536, and took his master's degree in 1542, in which year he was appointed Regius Professor of Hebrew by Henry VIII. Having been ordained priest he became chaplain to Henry Grey, Marquess of Dorchester (afterwards Duke of Suffolk). He at first embraced the Reformed opinions, but on the accession of Mary he declared himself a Catholic, despite the upbraidings of his friend Lady Jane Grey.

In 1554 he took the degree of Doctor of Divinity and was appointed prebendary of Winchester, becoming treasurer of Salisbury in the following year. He also acted as chaplain and confessor to Bishop Gardiner. When Elizabeth I became queen, he was deprived of his preferments and imprisoned. Subsequently, he lived in exile in Leuven. There he served St. Gertrude's church and devoted himself to study and to his long controversy with John Jewel, Bishop of Salisbury.

== Works ==
In 1564, he published "An answere to Maister Juelles Challenge", Jewel having undertaken to conform to the Catholic Church if any Catholic writer could prove that any of the Church Fathers of six centuries taught any of twenty-seven articles he selected. Jewel replied first in a sermon (which Harding answered in a broadsheet "To Maister John Jeuell", printed at Antwerp in 1565) and then in a book. Against the latter Harding wrote "A Rejoindre to M. Jewel's Replie" (Antwerp, 1566) and "A Rejoindre to M. Jewel's Replie against the Sacrifice of the Mass" (Louvain, 1567).

Meanwhile, he had become engaged in a second controversy with the same author, and, in his confutation of a book entitled an "Apologie of the Church of England" (Antwerp, 1565), he attacked an anonymous work, the authorship of which Jewel admitted in his "Defence of the Apologie of the Churche of Englande". Harding retorted with "A Detection of Sundrie Foule Errours, Lies, Sclaunders, corruptions, and other false Dealinges, touching Doctrine and other matters uttered and practized by M. Jewel" (Louvain, 1568).

In 1566, Pope Pius V appointed Harding and Nicholas Sanders as Apostolic delegates to England, with special powers of giving faculties to priests and of forbidding Catholics to frequent Protestant services.

Harding supported exiled English Catholics, and William Allen in founding the English College at Douai. He was buried (16 September 1572) in the Church of St Gertrude, Leuven.
