= Jean Crespin =

French Protestant lawyer and printer

Jean Crespin (c. 1520 – 12 April 1572) was a French Protestant lawyer who became a significant printer and martyrologist in Geneva.

== Life ==
He was born at Arras and studied law at Leuven. In 1540 he was in Paris, where he worked with his friend François Baudouin under the leading jurist and advocate Charles Du Moulin, and became himself advocate at the Parlement of Paris. He became interested in the doctrines of the Reformed Church; and when he returned to Arras, his relations with the Protestants caused him to be treated as a heretic.

In 1545 he went to Strasbourg, where he married. In 1548 he moved near his friend John Calvin; with his family he settled in Geneva, where he established a printing-press. In 1555 he received citizenship there. He died at Geneva in 1572.

== Works ==
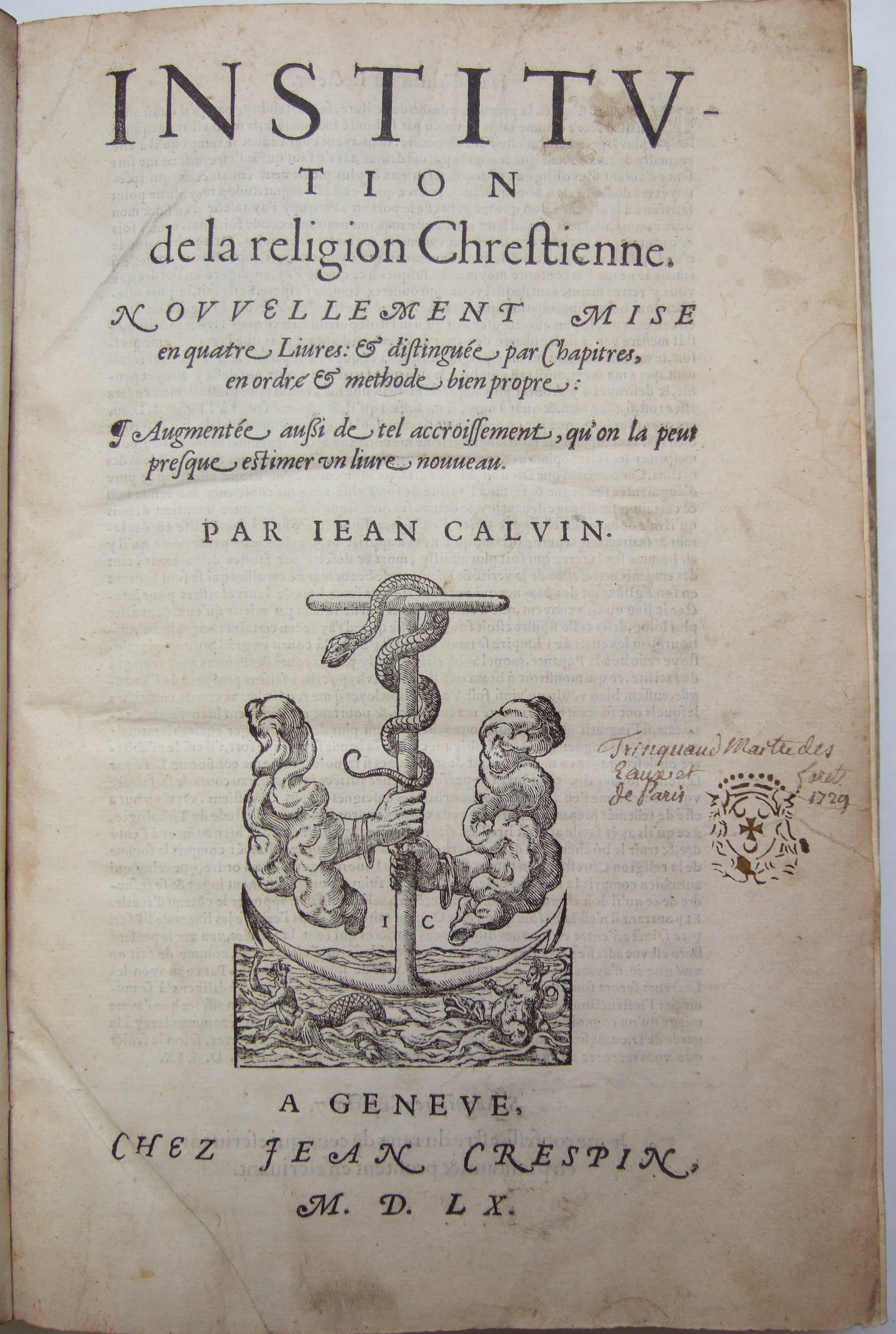
Crespin's edition of Calvin's Institutes of the Christian Religion, 1560.

In common with other printers and publishers of his time he also wrote and compiled books, most famously his martyrology, now popularly known as the Livre des Martyrs. This went through several editions between 1554 and 1570, under a variety of titles.

- Le Livre des Martyrs (Geneva, 1554)
- Recueil de plusieurs personnes qui ont constamment enduré la mort pour le nom de N. S. J. C. depuis Jean Hus jusqu'à cette année présente 1554 (1555);
- Troisieme partie du recueil des martyrs (1556)
- Quatrieme partie des actes des martyrs (1561)
- Cinquieme partie des actes des martyrs (1563)
- Actes de Martyrs (1564)
- Histoire des vrays témoins de la vérité de l'Évangile depuis Jean Hus jusqu'à présent (1570).

In addition, he is credited with:

- Le Marchand converti, tragédie nouvelle (1558);

1553 Printing of the NT in Greek To view text, see youtu.be/GsB-RfM87LU?si=qE0sgbxUXu0nx4o8

== See also ==
- Foxe’s Book of Martyrs
