= William Haller =

American historian of religion (1885–1974)

William Haller (1885 – 1974) was an American historian of Puritanism.

== Works ==
=== Books ===
- The Early Life of Robert Southey, 1774–1803 (New York: Columbia University Press, 1917).
- Tracts on Liberty in the Puritan Revolution, three volumes (New York: Columbia University Press, 1934).
- The Rise of Puritanism, or, the Way to the New Jerusalem as Set Forth in Pulpit and Press from Thomas Cartwright to John Lilburne and John Milton, 1570–1643 (New York: Columbia University Press, 1938).
- The Leveller Tracts, 1647–1653, co-edited with Godfrey Davies (New York: Columbia University Press, 1944).
- Liberty and Reformation in the Puritan Revolution (New York: Columbia University Press, 1955).
- Foxe's Book of Martyrs and the Elect Nation (London: Jonathan Cape, 1963).
- Elizabeth I and the Puritans (Ithaca, New York: Cornell University Press, 1964).

=== Articles ===
- 'Byron and the British Conscience', The Sewanee Review, Vol. 24, No. 1 (January 1916), pp. 1-18.
- 'Order and Progress in Paradise', PMLA, Vol. 35, No. 2 (1920), pp. 218-225.
- 'Southey's Later Radicalism', PMLA, Vol. 37, No. 2 (June 1922), pp. 281-292.
- 'Before Areopagitica', PMLA, Vol. 42, No. 4 (December 1927), pp. 875-900.
- 'The Puritan Art of Love', co-authored with Malleville Haller, Huntington Library Quarterly, Vol. 5, No. 2 (January 1942), pp. 235-272.
- '"For the Liberty of Unlicenc'd Printing"', The American Scholar, Vol. 14, No. 3 (Summer 1945), pp. 326-333.
- '"Hail Wedded Love"', ELH, Vol. 13, No. 2 (June 1946), pp. 79-97.
- 'Two Early Allusions to Milton's "Areopagitica"', Huntington Library Quarterly, Vol. 12, No. 2 (February 1949), pp. 207-212.
- 'The Word of God in the Westminster Assembly', Church History, Vol. 18, No. 4 (December 1949), pp. 199-219.
- 'The Word of God in the New Model Army', Church History, Vol. 19, No. 1 (March 1950), pp. 15-33
- '"What Needs My Shakespeare?"', Shakespeare Quarterly, Vol. 3, No. 1 (January 1952), pp. 3-16.
- 'Milton and the Protestant Ethic', Journal of British Studies, Vol. 1, No. 1 (November 1961), pp. 52-57.
