= List of Guggenheim Fellowships awarded in 1950 =

One hundred and fifty-eight Guggenheim Fellowships were awarded in 1950. This marked the 25th anniversary of the fellowship. $500,000 was disbursed to 158 people, including 24 Californians (12 of which were University of California faculty members) and 6 Canadians.

== 1950 U.S. and Canadian Fellows ==
Category	Field of Study	Fellow	Institutional association	Research topic	Notes	Ref
Creative Arts	Fiction	Lincoln Barnett		Writing		
Creative Arts	Fiction	Eleanor Clark		Series of essays about Rome, later published as Rome and a Villa (1952)	Also won in 1947	
Creative Arts	Fiction	Eleanor Green		Writing	Also won in 1949	
Creative Arts	Fiction	Peter M. H. Taylor	University of North Carolina Woman's College	Writing		
Creative Arts	Fiction	Janet Lewis Winters		Writing		
Creative Arts	Fine Arts	Federico Castellon		Painter	Also won in 1941	
Creative Arts	Fine Arts	Milton Goldstein		Development of a new color process for printmaking		
Creative Arts	Fine Arts	Martin Jackson		Painting and lithography	Also won in 1949	
Creative Arts	Fine Arts	Malcolm Haynie Myers		Painting	Also won in 1951	
Creative Arts	Fine Arts	Steve Raffo			Also won in 1951	
Creative Arts	Fine Arts	Andrée Ruellan				
Creative Arts	Fine Arts	David Smith		Sculpture	Also won in 1951	
Creative Arts	Fine Arts	Benton Murdoch Spruance	Beaver College	Color lithography	Also won in 1962	
Creative Arts	Music Composition	Elliott Carter		Composing	Also won in 1945	
Creative Arts	Music Composition	Irving Gifford Fine		Composing	Also won in 1958	
Creative Arts	Music Composition	Roger John Goeb		Composing	Also won in 1951	
Creative Arts	Music Composition	Gerald Raymond Kechley	University of Washington	Composing	Also won in 1949	
Creative Arts	Music Composition	Harry Partch		Development of an electronic musical instrument to play music on the forty-three tone per octave scale he invented	Joint with Lauriston C. Marshall; also won in 1943, 1944	
Creative Arts	Music Composition	Leo Smit		Composing		
Creative Arts	Music Composition	Robert E. Ward		Composing	Also won in 1949 and 1966	
Creative Arts	Music Composition	Ben Brian Weber		Composing	Also won in 1952	
Creative Arts	Poetry	Rosalie Moore		Writing	Also won in 1951	
Creative Arts	Poetry	Theodore Roethke	University of Washington	Writing	Also won in 1945	
Humanities	American Literature	Jay Leyda		Documentary reconstruction of the life and development of Emily Dickinson	Also won in 1951	
Humanities	Architecture, Planning and Design	Howard I. Chapelle				
Humanities	Architecture, Planning and Design	Christopher Tunnard	Yale University	American tradition in city planning		
Humanities	Bibliography	Lawrence Clark Powell	University of California, Los Angeles	History and present status of the relationship between the British antiquarian book trade and American research libraries	Also won in 1966	
Humanities	Biography	Victor Wolfgang von Hagen		E. G. Squier	Also won in 1949	
Humanities	British History	William Haller	Barnard College	History of Puritanism	Also won in 1947 and 1956	
Humanities	Classics	Aubrey Diller	Indiana University at Bloomington	Ptolemy's Geography		
Humanities	Classics	Gilbert Arthur Highet	Columbia University			
Humanities	Classics	Chester G. Starr	University of Illinois	Freedom of thought in the Roman Empire	Also won in 1958	
Humanities	East Asian Studies	Harold Robert Isaacs		Problems of nationalism in Southern Asia and American policy in relation to it		
Humanities	Economic History	Bray Hammond	Federal Reserve System (retired)	History of banking in the US and Canada	Also won in 1955	
Humanities	English Literature	Northrop Frye	University of Toronto	Structure of allegory in Spenser's The Faerie Queen; also, the symbolism of Shakespearean comedy		
Humanities	English Literature	Davis Philoon Harding	Yale University	Effect of Milton's knowledge of classical languages and literature on Paradise Lost		
Humanities	English Literature	Virgil Barney Heltzel	Northwestern University	Elizabethan literary patronage	Also won in 1949 and 1965	
Humanities	English Literature	Edward Niles Hooker	University of California, Los Angeles	Edition of the complete works of John Dryden	Joint with Hugh Thomas Swedenberg; also won in 1942	
Humanities	English Literature	George Winchester Stone, Jr.	George Washington University	Calendar of dramatic performances in London, 1660-1800	Also won in 1951 and 1963	
Humanities	English Literature	Hugh Thomas Swedenberg	University of California, Los Angeles	Edition of the complete works of John Dryden	Joint with Edward Niles Hooker	
Humanities	English Literature	John Harold Wilson	Ohio State University	Acting methods in the restoration theater, 1660-1700		
Humanities	Fine Arts Research	Albert William Christ-Janer	University of Chicago	Modern American church art and architecture		
Humanities	Fine Arts Research	Richard Krautheimer	Vassar College		Also won in 1953 and 1963	
Humanities	Fine Arts Research	Martín S. Soria	Michigan State College	Latin American painting and sculpture, 16th to 18th century		
Humanities	Fine Arts Research	Edgar Wind	Smith College	Raphael's School of Athens		
Humanities	Folklore and Popular Culture	Herbert Norman Halpert	Murray State College	Pine country of South Jersey, with special references to the folklore and folk music of that area		
Humanities	Folklore and Popular Culture	Marshall Winslow Stearns	Cornell University	History of jazz		
Humanities	French Literature	M. Amelia Klenke	College of. St. Mary of the Springs	Anglo-Norman literature		
Humanities	French Literature	Georges Claude May	Yale University	Historical, sociological, literary, and scientific background of Diderot's novel La Religieuse	Also won in 1984	
Humanities	General Nonfiction	Diana Trilling		The American family	Also won in 1991	
Humanities	German and East European History	Dietrich Gerhard	Washington University in St. Louis	Stabilizing forces in European history, 12th-19th centuries		
Humanities	German and Scandinavian Literature	Jean Hamilton Hubener	Victoria University, Toronto	German literary and scholarly publications during World War II and the immediate post-war period which reflect trends of German thinking and discussion		
Humanities	German and Scandinavian Literature	Victor Lange	Cornell University	Goethe's fiction	Also won in 1966	
Humanities	History of Science and Technology	Marshall Clagett	University of Wisconsin	Early history of science, particularly physics and calculus	Also won in 1946	
Humanities	Italian Literature	Charles S. Singleton	Harvard University	Critical edition of Boccaccio's Decameron	Also won in 1954 and 1962	
Humanities	Linguistics	Robert Fowkes	Corps of Engineers and New York University	Welsh language		
Humanities	Linguistics	W. Cabell Greet	Barnard College	European names, especially place names		
Humanities	Linguistics	Henry M. Hoenigswald	University of Pennsylvania	Grammar and lexicography of the Etruscan language		
Humanities	Linguistics	Helge Kökeritz	Yale University	Shakespeare's pronunciation	Also won in 1943	
Humanities	Literary Criticism	Richard Harter Fogle	Tulane University	Literary criticism of Samuel Taylor Coleridge and its influence on the "new" criticism		
Humanities	Literary Criticism	Walter B. C. Watkins			Also won in 1946	
Humanities	Medieval History	Herbert Bloch	Harvard University	Peter the Deacon and the Revival of Roman History in the 12th century		
Humanities	Medieval Literature	Pearl Kibre				
Humanities	Medieval Literature	Gerhart B. Ladner	University of Notre Dame	Influence of the early Christian idea of reform on medieval and renaissance civilization		
Humanities	Music Research	Isabel Pope		Spanish secular vocal music of the early Renaissance		
Humanities	Near Eastern Studies	Edith Porada		Travels in Turkey, Iraq, and Iran	Also won in 1982	
Humanities	Near Eastern Studies	Kenneth Meyer Setton	University of Manitoba	Athens in the Middle Ages	Also won in 1949	
Humanities	Philosophy	Monroe Curtis Beardsley	Swarthmore College	Philosophical and literary inquiry into the use of metaphor in the English language		
Humanities	Philosophy	Max Black	Cornell University	Philosophy of language		
Humanities	Philosophy	Ernest Nagel	Columbia University		Also won in 1934	
Humanities	Philosophy	Gregory Vlastos	Cornell University	Development of the moral and political concepts of Greek democracy	Also won in 1958	
Humanities	Religion	Robert McQueen Grant	University of the South	Relation between early Christianity and Hellenistic science	Also won in 1953, 1959	
Humanities	Russian History	Bertram D. Wolfe			Also won in 1949 and 1953	
Humanities	South Asian Studies	Franklin Edgerton	Yale University	Buddhist hybrid Sanskrit grammar and dictionary		
Humanities	Spanish and Portuguese Literature	Stephen Gilman	Ohio State University	Creative techniques of Benito Pérez Galdós		
Humanities	Spanish and Portuguese Literature	María Rosa Lida de Malkiel	University of California, Berkeley	Alexander the Great reinterpreted in early Old Spanish literature	Also won in 1949	
Humanities	Spanish and Portuguese Literature	Juan López-Morillas	Brown University	Philosophies of the Generation of '98 in Spain	Also won in 1957	
Humanities	Spanish and Portuguese Literature	Edwin S. Morby	University of California, Berkeley	Critical edition of Lope de Vega's La Dorotea	Also won in 1964	
Humanities	Theatre Arts	Boris Aronson		Concept of stage scenery		
Humanities	Theatre Arts	Rosamond Gilder	Barnard College	Modern American theater		
Humanities	United States History	Robert Donald Clark	University of Oregon	Biography of Bishop Matthew Simpson		
Humanities	United States History	John Hope Franklin	Howard University	Southern travelers' reactions to northern civilization, 1800-1860	Also won in 1973	
Humanities	United States History	George Edwin McMillan		Social history of the South, 1930-1948		
Humanities	United States History	James Z. Rabun	Emory University	Alexander H. Stephens		
Humanities	United States History	Charles Maurice Wiltse		Final volume of a three-volume biography of John C. Calhoun	Also won in 1949	
Natural Sciences	Applied Mathematics	Harry Richard Seiwell	Woods Hole Oceanographic Institution	Time series analysis of observational data		
Natural Sciences	Astronomy and Astrophysics	Bart Jan Bok	Harvard Observatory	Southern Milky Way		
Natural Sciences	Astronomy and Astrophysics	Dave Fultz	University of Chicago	Large-scale motions of planetary atmospheres		
Natural Sciences	Chemistry	Robert Arnold Alberty	University of Wisconsin	Competitive inhibition in enzyme-catalyzed reactions		
Natural Sciences	Chemistry	Sidney William Benson	University of Southern California	Chemical kinetics		
Natural Sciences	Chemistry	Bryce L. Crawford	University of Minnesota	Statistical mechanics applied to chemical problems	Also won in 1972	
Natural Sciences	Chemistry	Norman Henry Cromwell	University of Nebraska	Stereochemistry and ring-cleavage reaction mechanisms of ethylene imines	Also won in 1957	
Natural Sciences	Chemistry	William G. Dauben	University of California, Berkeley	Chemistry of Vitamin D	Also won in 1965	
Natural Sciences	Chemistry	Paul Mead Doty	Harvard University	Theory and application of light scatterling to collodial solutions		
Natural Sciences	Chemistry	Theodore A. Geissman	University of California, Los Angeles	Modes of action of physiologicall active substances	Also won in 1964	
Natural Sciences	Chemistry	Frederick Otto Koenig	Stanford University	Principles of electro-chemical thermodynamics	Also won in 1949	
Natural Sciences	Chemistry	Lester Peter Kuhn	Aberdeen Proving Ground			
Natural Sciences	Chemistry	Blaine C. McKusick	DuPont Company	Chemistry of natural products		
Natural Sciences	Chemistry	Kenneth Sanborn Pitzer	US Atomic Energy Commission	Chemical applications of quantum and statistical mechanics		
Natural Sciences	Chemistry	Milton David Soffer	Smith College	Chemistry of morphine and related compounds		
Natural Sciences	Earth Science	Francis John Turner	University of California	Crystal structures in marbles and peridotites	Also won in 1959	
Natural Sciences	Mathematics	Ralph Philip Boas, Jr.	Mathematical Reviews			
Natural Sciences	Mathematics	Samuel Eilenberg	Princeton University		Also won in 1974	
Natural Sciences	Mathematics	Philip Hartman	Johns Hopkins University	Quantum mechanics		
Natural Sciences	Mathematics	Norman Earl Steenrod	Princeton University	Algebraic topography		
Natural Sciences	Medicine and Health	Richard W. Lippman	Cedars of Lebanon Hospital	Renal function and the treatment of renal diseases	Also won in 1951	
Natural Sciences	Medicine and Health	Samuel Robert Means Reynolds			Also won in 1937	
Natural Sciences	Medicine and Health	Stephen Polyak	University of Chicago	Structure and function of the eyes and their connections with the brain		
Natural Sciences	Medicine and Health	M. C. Terry		Association of taste blindness and diabetes in the "Negro population of Jamaica"		
Natural Sciences	Medicine and Health	Gerhardt von Bonin	University of Illinois College of Medicine	Construction of an electronic cell counter to assist studies of comparative anatomy of the cerebral cortex		
Natural Sciences	Molecular and Cellular Biology	Ernest Borek	City College of New York	Effect of temperature on the utilization of carbon dioxide by microorganisms	Also won in 1957	
Natural Sciences	Molecular and Cellular Biology	Edward Charles Cantino	University of Pennsylvania	Biochemistry of aquatic fungi		
Natural Sciences	Molecular and Cellular Biology	Frank Host Dickey	California Institute of Technology			
Natural Sciences	Molecular and Cellular Biology	Arthur William Galston	California Institute of Technology	Research at the Karolinska Institute	Also won in 1946	
Natural Sciences	Molecular and Cellular Biology	Irving Goodman	University of Colorado	Nucleic acid derivatives	Also won in 1949	
Natural Sciences	Molecular and Cellular Biology	Evan Charles Horning	University of Pennsylvania	Organic chemistry as applied to chemotherapeutic problems		
Natural Sciences	Molecular and Cellular Biology	Robert E. Hungate	Washington State College	Nutrition of ruminant animals		
Natural Sciences	Molecular and Cellular Biology	Frank Harris Johnson	Princeton University	Mechanisms that control biological processes	Also won in 1944 and 1945	
Natural Sciences	Molecular and Cellular Biology	Michael Kasha	University of Chicago	Intermolecular energy transfer		
Natural Sciences	Molecular and Cellular Biology	Kenneth James McCallum	University of Saskatchewan	Microwave spectroscopy in terms of molecular structure and molecular energy levels		
Natural Sciences	Molecular and Cellular Biology	F. H. L. Taylor	Boston City Hospital	Biochemical approaches to medicine		
Natural Sciences	Molecular and Cellular Biology	Kenneth V. Thimann	Harvard University	Physiology of micro-organisism	Also won in 1957	
Natural Sciences	Molecular and Cellular Biology	Hans Handforth Zinsser	University of Pennsylvania School of Medicine	Theoretical chemistry as applied to studies of renal dysfunction	Also won in 1949	
Natural Sciences	Organismic Biology and Ecology	William Eugene Berg	University of California	Cellular physiology of the mollusk Mytilus edulis		
Natural Sciences	Organismic Biology and Ecology	Herbert Friedmann	US National Museum	Parasitic reproductive habits of honeyguides and weaverbirds of Africa	Also won in 1953 and 1955	
Natural Sciences	Organismic Biology and Ecology	Francis Harper			Also won in 1951	
Natural Sciences	Organismic Biology and Ecology	Harlow Burgess Mills	Illinois Natural History Survey	Invertebrate soil fauna		
Natural Sciences	Organismic Biology and Ecology	Francis Joseph Ryan				
Natural Sciences	Organismic Biology and Ecology	Ray Fred Smith	University of California	Leaf beetles of the genus Diabrotica in the US and Mexico		
Natural Sciences	Organismic Biology and Ecology	George Willard Wharton, Jr	Duke University	Systematic study of the chiggers of Mexico and their relationships to the North Carolina fauna		
Natural Sciences	Physics	Julian Himely Bigelow	Princeton University	Logical theory and physical realizability of computational automata and of their influence on other fields of science		
Natural Sciences	Physics	Sidney Michael Dancoff	University of Illinois	Relativistic meson theory of nuclear forces		
Natural Sciences	Physics	David A. Lind	California Institute of Technology			
Natural Sciences	Physics	Julian Ellis Mack	University of Wisconsin	Atomic spectra		
Natural Sciences	Physics	Lauriston C. Marshall	University of California	Development of an electronic musical instrument to play music on the forty-three tone per octave scale	Joint with Harry Partch	
Natural Sciences	Plant Science	Edgar Anderson	Washington University in St. Louis and Missouri Botanical Garden	Origin and development of cultivated plants in the New World	Also won in 1943, 1956	
Natural Sciences	Plant Science	Howard Scott Gentry	University of Southern California			
Natural Sciences	Plant Science	Sergius Henry Mamay	Washington University in St. Louis	Coal age floras of Europe and America		
Natural Sciences	Plant Science	Nicholas Polunin	McGill University	Arctic botany	Also won in 1951	
Natural Sciences	Plant Science	Charles Madeira Rick, Jr.	University of California, Davis	Wild and cultivated tomatoes	Also won in 1948	
Natural Sciences	Statistics	Emil J. Gumbel				
Natural Sciences	Statistics	George Kingsley Zipf	Harvard University	Marketing phenomena		
Social Sciences	Anthropology and Cultural Studies	Edward Wyllys Andrews, IV	Central Intelligence Agency	Early Mayan archaeology in northern Yucatán		
Social Sciences	Anthropology and Cultural Studies	David Bidney	Indiana University	Myth in primitive and modern culture		
Social Sciences	Anthropology and Cultural Studies	Hjalmar R. Holand		Norse expeditions to pre-Columbian America		
Social Sciences	Anthropology and Cultural Studies	Walter Taylor				
Social Sciences	Economics	Wassily W. Leontief	Harvard University	Structure and functions of economic systems	Also won in 1940	
Social Sciences	Economics	Charles Edward Lindblom	Yale University	Relations between government and economic processes	Also won in 1985	
Social Sciences	Economics	W. Rupert Maclaurin	Massachusetts Institute of Technology	Economic of innovation in the housing industry		
Social Sciences	Economics	Edwin G. Nourse		Dynamic stabilization of free enterprise within the structure of free government	Also won in 1951	
Social Sciences	Political Science	Robert Alan Dahl	Yale University	Relations between government and economic processes	Also won in 1978	
Social Sciences	Political Science	Samuel J. Konefsky	Brooklyn College	Holmes and Braindeis: A Study in the Influence of Ideas	Also won in 1951	
Social Sciences	Political Science	Samuel Lubell		Roosevelt political heritage, showing the transformation of the US from a "normally Republican" to a "normally Democratic" majority	Also won in 1953	
Social Sciences	Political Science	Bernard Schwartz				
Social Sciences	Political Science	Julian Towster	Columbia University	Soviet Foreign Office and foreign service		
Social Sciences	Political Science	Eric Herman Wilhelm Voegelin	Louisiana State University		Also won in 1955	
Social Sciences	Psychology	Jean Evans			Also won in 1955	
Social Sciences	Psychology	Mary Henle			Also won in 1960	
Social Sciences	Sociology	Wolfram Eberhard	University of California, Berkeley	Social structure of southeast Anatolia	Also won in 1951	

== 1950 Latin American and Caribbean Fellows ==
Category	Field of Study	Fellow	Institutional association	Research topic	Notes	Ref
Creative Arts	Fine Arts	Juan Cruz Reyes	Instituto de Investigaciones Etnográficas	Pre-Hispanic sculpture and creativeness		
Humanities	Architecture, Planning and Design	Alvaro Ortega				
Humanities	Iberian and Latin American History	Francisco Cuevas Cancino				
Humanities	Intellectual and Cultural History	Juan Larrea			Also won in 1949	
Natural Sciences	Chemistry	Simão Mathias				
Natural Sciences	Chemistry	Marcos Tschapek				
Natural Sciences	Earth Science	Ismael Escobar Vallejo				
Natural Sciences	Mathematics	Mischa Cotlar		Ergodic theory	Also won in 1952	
Natural Sciences	Medicine and Health	Augusto A. Camara			Also won in 1951	
Natural Sciences	Medicine and Health	Luis Vargas García Alons				
Natural Sciences	Molecular and Cellular Biology	Francisco J. S. Lara			Also won in 1951	
Natural Sciences	Molecular and Cellular Biology	Osvaldo Argentino Peso				
Natural Sciences	Molecular and Cellular Biology	Raúl Esteban Trucco			Also won in 1949	
Natural Sciences	Neuroscience	José Bebin Bustamante			Also won in 1951	
Natural Sciences	Organismic Biology and Ecology	Abelardo Moreno Bonilla			Also won in 1949	
Natural Sciences	Organismic Biology and Ecology	Dioscoro S. Rabor			Also won in 1956	
Natural Sciences	Plant Science	Ramón Ferreyra				
Natural Sciences	Plant Science	José Cuatrecasas	Chicago Natural History Museum		Also won in 1951	
Natural Sciences	Plant Science	Henri Alain Liogier			Also won in 1953 and 1957	
Natural Sciences	Plant Science	Veridiana Victoria Rossetti	University of North Carolina	Physiology of phycomycetes		
Natural Sciences	Plant Science	Alberto Soriano	Ministerio de Agricultura y Ganadería	Research at the California Institute of Technology with Frits Warmolt Went		
Social Sciences	Anthropology and Cultural Studies	Milciades Chaves Chamorro				

== See also ==
- Guggenheim Fellowship
- List of Guggenheim Fellowships awarded in 1949
- List of Guggenheim Fellowships awarded in 1951
