= List of Guggenheim Fellowships awarded in 1948 =

One hundred and twelve Guggenheim Fellowships were awarded in 1948. Twenty-five of the artists and scholars were from California, the most from any state.

== 1948 U.S. and Canadian Fellows ==
| Category | Field of Study | Fellow | Institutional association | Research topic | Notes | Ref |
|---|---|---|---|---|---|---|
| Creative Arts | Drama and Performance Art | Theodore Ward | | Wrote play that would become John Brown | | |
| Creative Arts | Fiction | Saul Bellow | University of Minnesota | Writing | Also won in 1955 | |
| Creative Arts | Fiction | Sam Byrd | University of North Carolina | Writing | Also won in 1946 | |
| Creative Arts | Fiction | Elizabeth Bruce Hardwick | | Writing | | |
| Creative Arts | Fiction | James Farl Powers | | Writing | | |
| Creative Arts | Fiction | Jean Stafford | | Writing | Also won in 1945 | |
| Creative Arts | Fiction | William Woods | | Writing | | |
| Creative Arts | Fiction | Marguerite Young | | Writing | | |
| Creative Arts | Film | Francis Lee | | | | |
| Creative Arts | Film | John Hales Whitney | | Experimental works in abstract animated sound film | Also won in 1947 | |
| Creative Arts | Fine Arts | Eugene Berman | | Paintings and studies of Baroque architecture in Latin countries | Also won in 1946 | |
| Creative Arts | Fine Arts | Sue Fuller | Museum of Modern Art | Printmaking | | |
| Creative Arts | Fine Arts | Allan Capron Houser | Haskell Institute | Sculpture and painting at the San Carlos Apache Indian Reservation | | |
| Creative Arts | Fine Arts | Victoria Hutson Huntley | | | | |
| Creative Arts | Fine Arts | Mitchell Jamieson | | Painting | Also won in 1946 | |
| Creative Arts | Fine Arts | Reuben Tam | | Painting | | |
| Creative Arts | Fine Arts | Denny Winters | | Painting | | |
| Creative Arts | Music Composition | Nicolai Tichanovitch Berezowsky | | Composing | | |
| Creative Arts | Music Composition | Romeo Cascarino | | Composing | Also won in 1949 | |
| Creative Arts | Music Composition | Leon Kirchner | University of California, Berkeley | Composing | Also won in 1949 | |
| Creative Arts | Music Composition | Hubert Weldon Lamb | Wellesley College | Composing | | |
| Creative Arts | Music Composition | H. Owen Reed | Michigan State College | Composing | | |
| Creative Arts | Photography | Ansel Adams | | America's national parks and monuments | Also won in 1946, 1959 | |
| Creative Arts | Photography | James A. Fitzsimmons | | Color photography | | |
| Creative Arts | Poetry | Douglas Valentine LePan | High Commission of Canada, London | Writing | | |
| Creative Arts | Poetry | Kenneth Rexroth | | Writing | Also won in 1949 | |
| Creative Arts | Poetry | Peter R. Viereck | Smith College | Writing | Also won in 1954 | |
| Humanities | American Literature | Charles John Olson | | Narrative writing | Also won in 1939 | |
| Humanities | American Literature | Norman Holmes Pearson | Yale University | Edition of Nathaniel Hawthorne's letters | Also won in 1956 | |
| Humanities | Architecture, Planning and Design | Robert Woods Kennedy | Massachusetts Institute of Technology | Development of a new method of teaching design | | |
| Humanities | Architecture, Planning and Design | Hugh Sinclair Morrison | Dartmouth College | History of American architecture from the colonial period to the present | | |
| Humanities | British History | David Harris Willson | University of Minnesota | Biography on James I | Also won in 1941, 1943, 1963 | |
| Humanities | Classics | John Petersen Elder | Harvard University | Vatican Mythographers | | |
| Humanities | Classics | Louise Adams Holland | Bryn Mawr College | Study of the cults of Janus and Vesta "on the basis of the topography, climatic conditions and needs of the primitive city of Rome" | | |
| Humanities | Dance Studies | Edwin Denby | | Comparative study of European and American ballet | | |
| Humanities | East Asian Studies | Wing-tsit Chan | Dartmouth College | Neo-Confucianism in China, 11th to 20th centuries | | |
| Humanities | Economic History | Louis Morton Hacker | Columbia University | American post-Civil War generation, 1865-1900, in industrial and intellectual terms | Also won in 1958 | |
| Humanities | Economic History | Robert Sabatino Lopez | Yale University | History of the guilds of southern European manufacturers of coins from the 4th to 15th century | Also won in 1951 | |
| Humanities | English Literature | John Erskine Hankins | University of Kansas | Backgrounds of Shakespeare's philosophy | | |
| Humanities | English Literature | Louis L. Martz | Yale University | English religious poetry during the 16th and 17th centuries in relation to the Continental movement toward methodical religious meditation | Also won in 1981 | |
| Humanities | English Literature | Ada Nisbet | University of California, Los Angeles | Basic trends in the social and intellectual relations between England and America in the early Victorian period | Also won in 1954 | |
| Humanities | English Literature | Mark Schorer | University of California, Berkeley | Book on techniques of fiction and completion of a novel | Also won in 1941, 1942, 1973 | |
| Humanities | Fine Arts Research | Charles de Tolnay | Institute for Advanced Study | Monograph on Michelangelo, 1534-1564 | Also won in 1949, 1953 | |
| Humanities | Fine Arts Research | Horst Woldemar Janson | Washington University in St. Louis | Works of Donatello | Also won in 1955 | |
| Humanities | Fine Arts Research | Marvin Chauncey Ross | Walters Art Gallery | Alfred Barye | Also won in 1938, 1939, 1952 | |
| Humanities | Folklore and Popular Culture | Bertrand Harris Bronson | University of California, Berkely | Musical-literary companion to Francis James Child's English and Scottish Popular Ballads | Also won in 1943, 1944 | |
| Humanities | Folklore and Popular Culture | Harold Courlander | New York State Department of State | Life of the Indigenous peoples of South Africa | Also won in 1955 | |
| Humanities | French History | William Farr Church | Brown University | Political thought in 17th century France | Also won in 1945, 1953 | |
| Humanities | French Literature | Jean-Albert Bédé | Columbia University | 1948 in Europe, particularly France | | |
| Humanities | French Literature | William Kenneth Cornell | Yale University | History of the French Symbolist movement | | |
| Humanities | French Literature | Herbert Dieckmann | Washington University in St. Louis | Development and structure of Diderot's thought | | |
| Humanities | French Literature | Isidore Silver | Brown University | Pierre de Ronsard and the Hellenic Renaissance in France | | |
| Humanities | General Nonfiction | Sally Carrighar | | Study of Alaskan wildlife in preparation for a book that would become Icebound Summer (1953) | Also won in 1949 | |
| Humanities | General Nonfiction | Joseph Kinsey Howard | | Book about the Métis people | Also won in 1947 | |
| Humanities | German and East European History | Charles Calvert Bayley | McGill University | Consolidation of the College of Electors in Germany in the 14th century | | |
| Humanities | Iberian and Latin American History | Engel Sluiter | University of California, Berkeley | Dutch-Iberian colonial rivalry in the 17th century | | |
| Humanities | Italian History | Antonio Pace | Syracuse University | Benjamin Franklin and Italy | Also won in 1960 | |
| Humanities | Linguistics | Yakov Malkiel | University of California, Berkeley | Historical study of Hispanic word formation, including old and modern Portuguese, and dialectical varieties in the Iberian Peninsula and in Latin America | Also won in 1959, 1966 | |
| Humanities | Literary Criticism | Eric Russell Bentley | University of Minnesota | Nature of dramatic art | Also won in 1967 | |
| Humanities | Literary Criticism | Edwin Honig | University of New Mexico | Comparative studies of "certain works of epical and allegorical imagination in European literature" since Edmund Spenser | Also won in 1962 | |
| Humanities | Literary Criticism | Wilbur Samuel Howell | Princeton University | Historical survey on the theory of poetry and rhetoric in England and America, 1530-1900 | Also won in 1957 | |
| Humanities | Literary Criticism | Josephine Miles | University of California, Berkeley | History of English poetic language, specifically the 16th to 20th centuries | | |
| Humanities | Literary Criticism | Reuben Wallenrod | Brooklyn College | Modern Hebrew Palestinian literature | | |
| Humanities | Medieval Literature | Francis James Carmody | University of California, Berkeley | Arabic astronomy in the Middle Ages | | |
| Humanities | Medieval Literature | Ruth J. Dean | Mount Holyoke College | Descriptive catalogue of Anglo-Norman manuscripts in Europe and North America | | |
| Humanities | Medieval Literature | Elliott Van Kirk Dobbie | Columbia University | Editions of Beowulf and Judith | | |
| Humanities | Medieval Literature | Theodor Ernst Mommsen | Princeton University | Petrarch's historical works and ideas | | |
| Humanities | Medieval Literature | Helaine Newstead | Hunter College | Development of the Tristan legend in the Middle Ages | | |
| Humanities | Medieval Literature | John C. Pope | Yale University | History of the Anglo-Saxon period of English literature | | |
| Humanities | Medieval Literature | Arnold Williams | Michigan State College | Intellectual background of 14th-century English literature | | |
| Humanities | Music Research | Stephen Davidson Tuttle | University of Virginia | Keyboard works of the English Virginalist composers | | |
| Humanities | Music Research | Otto John Gombosi | Michigan State College | Certain popular patterns of Renaissance music and their tradition in English and America, from Elizabethan times to present | | |
| Humanities | Music Research | Erich Hertzmann | Columbia University | Beethoven's autograph compositions and sketches | | |
| Humanities | Philosophy | William Frankena | University of Michigan | History of ethical thought and moral philosophy in Great Britain and the US | | |
| Natural Science | Chemistry | Richard T. Arnold | University of Minnesota | Stereochemistry | | |
| Natural Science | Chemistry | Robert E. Connick | University of California, Berkeley | Complexion formation | Also won in 1958 | |
| Natural Science | Chemistry | Paul Antoine Giguère | Laval University | Molecular structure of hydrogen peroxide by the spectroscopic method | Also won in 1946 | |
| Natural Science | Chemistry | Michael Peech | Cornell University | Soil chemistry and soil-plant relationships | | |
| Natural Science | Earth Science | Walter Munk | Scripps Institute of Oceanography | Effect of wind stress upon ocean currents, with an emphasis on transient conditions | Also won in 1953, 1962 | |
| Natural Science | Mathematics | Claude Charles Chevalley | Princeton University | Theories of Lie groups | | |
| Natural Science | Mathematics | Irving Kaplansky | University of Chicago | Topological rings | | |
| Natural Science | Mathematics | Norman Levinson | Massachusetts Institute of Technology | Non-linear differential equations | | |
| Natural Science | Medicine and Health | Henry Shepard Fuller | University of North Carolina | Taxonomy and distribution of the mites of the family Trombiculidae, in relation to their transmission of diseases | | |
| Natural Science | Medicine and Health | Doris Phelps Orwin | Vanderbilt University School of Medicine | Reproductive and gynecological physiology | | |
| Natural Science | Molecular and Cellular Biology | Erwin Chargaff | Columbia University | Chemistry of lipoproteins and nucleoproteins and their role in cellular structure and specificity | | |
| Natural Science | Molecular and Cellular Biology | Roy Philip Forster | Dartmouth College | Kidney functions | Also won in 1955 | |
| Natural Science | Molecular and Cellular Biology | Choh Hao Li | University of California, Berkeley | Physico-chemical nature of growth and adrenocorticotropic hormones isolated from the anterior lobe of the pituitary | | |
| Natural Science | Neuroscience | James Mather Sprague | Johns Hopkins University Medical School | Anatomical organization of the spinal motor system | | |
| Natural Science | Organismic Biology and Ecology | Ellsworth Dougherty | | Evolution and genetics of Rhabditida nematodes | Also won in 1945 | |
| Natural Science | Organismic Biology and Ecology | George Henry Mickey | Louisiana State University | Genetic and cytological effects of treatment of the germ cells in Drosophila melanogaster with X-ray and UV radiation | | |
| Natural Science | Physics | Julian Knause Knipp | Iowa State University | Energy loss of fast ions in their passage through matter | | |
| Natural Science | Plant Science | Lawrence Rogers Blinks | Stanford University | Photochemistry of phycoerythrin | Also won in 1939, 1957 | |
| Natural Science | Plant Science | Orville Thomas Bonnett | University of Illinois | Developmental morphology and histology of the tassel and ear of types of maize | | |
| Natural Science | Plant Science | Pierre Dansereau | University of Montreal | Taxonomy of vascular plants, emphasizing the mechanism of evolution | | |
| Natural Science | Plant Science | Ralph Emerson | University of California, Berkeley | Mechanisms of sexuality and reproduction in aquatic fungi | Also won in 1956 | |
| Natural Science | Plant Science | Adriance Sherwood Foster | University of California, Berkeley | Morphology of certain tropical plants, particularly of the genus Mouriri | Also won in 1941 | |
| Natural Science | Plant Science | Roy Wesley Nixon | US Department of Agriculture | Ecological study of date varieties in French North Africa | | |
| Natural Science | Plant Science | Harold Ignatius Paul Olmo | University of California, Davis | Indigenous fruit and nut varieties of Persia and Afghanistan, with the purpose of introducing seeds and selon material into California for use in fruit breeding | | |
| Natural Science | Plant Science | Charles Madeira Rick, Jr. | University of California, Davis | Tomato species of the Andean region of South America and of California from the point of view of their breeding mechanisms | Also won in 1950 | |
| Natural Science | Plant Science | Ismael Vélez | Polytechnic Institute of San Germán | Herbaceous vegetation of the Caribbean archipelago, with an emphasis on the taxonomy and ecology of the herbaceous spermatophytes | | |
| Social Science | Anthropology and Cultural Studies | John Lawrence Angel | Jefferson Medical College | Biological history of the inhabitants of Ancient Greece | | |
| Social Science | Economics | George Vickers Haythorne | Department of Labour at Ottawa | Conditions necessary for developing and maintaining full employment in Canadian agriculture | | |
| Social Science | Economics | John Perry Miller | Yale University | Theory of markets and prices | | |
| Social Science | Economics | Paul Samuelson | Massachusetts Institute of Technology | Economics of inflationary conditions | | |
| Social Science | Economics | Warren Candler Scoville | University of California, Los Angeles | "Effects upon French industry and economic life of the persecution and migration of the Huguenots before and after the revocation of the Edict of Nantes" | Also won in 1955 | |
| Social Science | Law | Samuel Edmund Thorne | Yale University School of Law | Court of Chancery and the Court of Star Chamber during the late 16th and early 17th centuries, with a special emphasis on the transition from medieval to modern law | Also won in 1951, 1956 | |
| Social Science | Political Science | Robert W. Frase | Harvard University | Proposals for international control of atomic energy | | |
| Social Science | Political Science | George Francis Gilman Stanley | University of British Columbia | Governmental policy towards the Canadian Indian | | |
| Social Science | Psychology | Joseph Barrell | Pomfret School | Book: A Philosophical Study of the Human Mind | | |
| Social Science | Psychology | Robert Ward Leeper | University of Oregon | Psychology of personality | | |
| Social Science | Psychology | Gregory H. Razran | Queens College, New York | Interrelations between attitudinal controls and conditioned responses in humans | | |
| Social Science | Psychology | Hans Wallach | Swarthmore College | Psychology of perception | | |

== 1948 Latin American and Caribbean Fellows ==
| Category | Field of Study | Fellow | Institutional association | Research topic | Notes | Ref |
|---|---|---|---|---|---|---|
| Creative Arts | Fine Arts | Alejandro Mario Illanes | | Painting and engraving | | |
| Creative Arts | Fine Arts | Miguel Sopó Duque | | Sculpture | | |
| Creative Arts | Poetry | Agustí Bartra Lleonart | Lietres | Writing | Also won in 1949, 1960 | |
| Humanities | Linguistics | John Corominas | | Etymological dictionary of the Spanish language | Also won in 1945, 1957 | |
| Humanities | Literary Criticism | José Antonio Portuondo | | History of literary criticism in Spanish America | | |
| Humanities | Philosophy | José María Ferrater Mora | University of Chile | Main currents of philosophy in the United States | Also won in 1946 | |
| Natural Science | Astronomy and Astrophysics | Víctor M. Blanco | | Statistical astronomy, particularly determination of the luminosity function for stars in the vicinity of the sun | Also won in 1954 | |
| Natural Science | Engineering | Luis Hernán Tejada-Flores | | Phenomenon of dielectric recovery as related to the transmission of electric power | | |
| Natural Science | Mathematics | Cândido Lima da Silva Dias | University of São Paulo | Differential geometry and topology | | |
| Natural Science | Medicine and Health | Mauro Pereira Barretto | University of São Paulo | Monograph on the horseflies of neo-tropical America | | |
| Natural Science | Medicine and Health | Juan García Ramos | Institute of Cardiology, Mexico City | Neurology, particularly central excitation and inhibition | Also won in 1951 | |
| Natural Science | Molecular and Cellular Biology | Carlos Chagas | University of Brazil | Effects of UV rays on cell growth | | |
| Natural Science | Molecular and Cellular Biology | Thales Martins | Oswaldo Cruz Institute | Influence of hormones on animal behavior | Also won in 1947 | |
| Natural Science | Molecular and Cellular Biology | Roberto Luiz Pimenta de Mello | Ministry of Education and Health, Oswaldo Cruz Institute | Hematology, particularly metabolism of porphyrins | Also won in 1949 | |
| Natural Science | Molecular and Cellular Biology | Julio Morató Manaro | Institute of Endocrinology, Montevideo | Steroid chemistry and applications to clinical problems | | |
| Natural Science | Organismic Biology and Ecology | Juan Gerónimo Esteban | National University of Tucumán | Furnariidae of Argentina | | |
| Natural Science | Organismic Biology and Ecology | Abraham Willink | Miguel Lillo Institute | Hymenoptera of Argentina | Also won in 1962 | |
| Natural Science | Physics | José Leite Lopes | University of Brazil | Fundamental theory of nuclear force | | |
| Natural Science | Plant Science | Jaime Guiscafre-Arrillaga | | Host and parasite relationships between rots-producing plant pathogens and citrus fruits with the purpose of finding methods of controlling after-harvest fruit decays | | |

== See also ==
- Guggenheim Fellowship
- List of Guggenheim Fellowships awarded in 1947
- List of Guggenheim Fellowships awarded in 1949
