= List of Guggenheim Fellowships awarded in 1949 =

One hundred and forty-four Guggenheim Fellowships were awarded in 1949.

== 1949 U.S. and Canadian Fellows ==
Category	Field of Study	Fellow	Institutional association	Research topic	Notes	Ref
Creative Arts	Choreography	Doris Humphrey		Book about choreography "with special reference to sources and methods for the composition of modern dances"		
Creative Arts	Drama and Performance Art	John La Touche		Trilogy of lyrical plays		
Creative Arts	Fiction	Eleanor Green		Writing	Also won in 1950	
Creative Arts	Fiction	Jean Paul Malaquais		Writing		
Creative Arts	Fiction	Mary McCarthy		Writing	Also won in 1959	
Creative Arts	Fiction	Wallace Stegner	Stanford University	John Wesley Powell	Also won in 1952 and 1959	
Creative Arts	Fiction	Eudora Alice Welty		Writing	Also won in 1942	
Creative Arts	Fiction	Jay Williams		Writing		
Creative Arts	Film	Philip Francisco Stapp				
Creative Arts	Fine Arts	Hyman Bloom		Painting		
Creative Arts	Fine Arts	Eldzier Cortor		Painting		
Creative Arts	Fine Arts	Martin Jackson	Fleisher Art Memorial	Painting and lithography	Also won in 1950	
Creative Arts	Fine Arts	Peter Lipman-Wulf				
Creative Arts	Fine Arts	Arthur Osver		Painting	Also won in 1951	
Creative Arts	Fine Arts	Alexander Peter Russo		Painting	Also won in 1947	
Creative Arts	Fine Arts	Leonard Louis Schwartz		Sculpture		
Creative Arts	Fine Arts	Charles Umlauf		Sculpture		
Creative Arts	Music Composition	Samuel Barber		Composing	Also won in 1945 and 1947	
Creative Arts	Music Composition	John Cage		Composing		
Creative Arts	Music Composition	Romeo Cascarino		Composing	Also won in 1948	
Creative Arts	Music Composition	Alexei Haieff		Composing	Also won in 1946	
Creative Arts	Music Composition	Gerald Raymond Kechley		Composing	Also won in 1950	
Creative Arts	Music Composition	Leon Kirchner	University of California, Berkeley	Composing	Also won in 1948	
Creative Arts	Music Composition	Peter Mennin		Composing		
Creative Arts	Music Composition	Jerome Moross		Composing	Also won in 1947	
Creative Arts	Music Composition	Robert E. Ward		Composing	Also won in 1950 and 1966	
Creative Arts	Photography	Homer Gordon Page		"Classic street work"		
Creative Arts	Poetry	William Oliver Everson		Writing		
Creative Arts	Poetry	Kenneth Rexroth		Writing	Also won in 1948	
Creative Arts	Theatre Arts	John Waldhorn Gassner				
Humanities	Biography	Arna Bontemps	Fisk University	Frederick Douglass, Booker T. Washington, and W. E. B. DuBois		
Humanities	Biography	Rackham Holt		Sir Wilfred Grenfell		
Humanities	Biography	Jeannette Mirsky			Also won in 1947	
Humanities	Biography	Victor Wolfgang von Hagen		Ephraim George Squier	Also won in 1950	
Humanities	British History	Archibald Smith Foord	Yale University	Development of "His Majesty's Opposition" in England, 1714-1830	Also won in 1968	
Humanities	British History	Ruth A. McIntyre	Mount Holyoke College	English merchant class as promoters of early 17th-century discovery and colonial enterprise		
Humanities	British History	Dora Neill Raymond	Sweet Briar College	First Earl of Lytton		
Humanities	Classics	Elias Joseph Bickerman	Jewish Theological Seminary of America		Also won in 1959	
Humanities	English Literature	Emmett Langdon Avery	Washington State College	Calendar of theatrical performances in 18th-century London		
Humanities	English Literature	Richard David Ellmann	Harvard University	Poetry of W. B. Yeats	Also won in 1957 and 1970	
Humanities	English Literature	Virgil Barney Heltzel	Northwestern University	History of literary patronage in Elizabethan England	Also won in 1950 and 1965	
Humanities	English Literature	Malcolm MacKenzie Ross	University of Toronto	Christian symbolism in English poetry, 1600-1660		
Humanities	English Literature	Austin Warren	State University of Iowa	Poetry of John Donne		
Humanities	Fine Arts Research	Charles de Tolnay	Institute for Advanced Study	Michelangelo	Also won in 1948 and 1953	
Humanities	Fine Arts Research	Sydney Joseph Freedberg	Wellesley College	Mannerism in Florentine and Roman painting of the early 16th century	Also won in 1954	
Humanities	Fine Arts Research	Gordon Bailey Washburn	Rhode Island School of Design Museum	"Isms in Art Since 1800"		
Humanities	Fine Arts Research	Harold Edwin Wethey	University of Michigan		Also won in 1971	
Humanities	Fine Arts Research	Adja Yunkers	University of Mexico (visiting)		Also won in 1954	
Humanities	Folklore and Popular Culture	Richard Mercer Dorson	Michigan State College	English folklore and folklorists, 1860-1915	Also won in 1964 and 1971	
Humanities	Folklore and Popular Culture	Duncan Black Macdonald Emrich	Library of Congress	Folklore of the western States, exclusive of the Pacific Coast		
Humanities	Folklore and Popular Culture	Albert Bates Lord	Harvard University	Jugo-Slav music and epic poetry		
Humanities	French History	Paul Harold Beik	Swarthmore College	Conflicting social philosophies in the French Revolution	Also won in 1947	
Humanities	French History	Carl Vincent Confer	Syracuse University	Colonialism in France, 1870 to present		
Humanities	French Literature	William Joseph Roach	University of Pennsylvania	Legend of the Holy Grail	Also won in 1956	
Humanities	French Literature	Jean Joseph Seznec	Harvard University	Interrelations between the history of art and history of literature		
Humanities	French Literature	Philip Adrian Wadsworth	Yale University	LaFontaine's artistic and cultural development in his early poems, tales, and fables		
Humanities	French Literature	Ronald N. Walpole	University of California, Berkeley	Preparation of an edition of the Old French Johannis translation of the Pseudo-Turpin Chronicle		
Humanities	General Nonfiction	Robert Sharon Allen	Our Fair City	Operation of state government		
Humanities	General Nonfiction	Sally Carrighar		Book on Alaskan wildlife called Where Storms Begin	Also won in 1948	
Humanities	General Nonfiction	Bernard Mishkin		His experiences in Peru		
Humanities	General Nonfiction	Angelo M. Pellegrini	Yale University	Immigrant's Return (published 1951)		
Humanities	German and East European History	Robert A. Kann	Rutgers University	Cultural history of the German Austrians in modern times		
Humanities	History of Science and Technology	Francis Rarick Johnson	Stanford University	History of scientific thought and activity in Elizabethan England, with special emphasis on the relation of science to the other intellectual and material concerns of that age	Also won in 1942	
Humanities	Latin American Literature	Samuel Whitehall Putnam		Brazilian literature		
Humanities	Linguistics	Isidore Dyen	Yale University	Malayo-Polynesian languages spoken in the Philippine Islands and in the East Indies	Also won in 1964	
Humanities	Linguistics	Murray B. Emeneau	University of California, Berkeley	A Dravidian etymological dictionary, and a volume of texts in the Toda language	Also won in 1956	
Humanities	Literary Criticism	James Craig La Drière				
Humanities	Literary Criticism	Wylie Sypher	Simmons College	"Studies in Form"	Also won in 1958	
Humanities	Literary Criticism	James Thorpe	Princeton University	Critical study of the moral ideas in 18th-century literature	Also won in 1965	
Humanities	Medieval History	Robert Stuart Hoyt	State University of Iowa	Constitutional history of the royal demesne in England during the 12th, 13th, and 14th centuries		
Humanities	Medieval Literature	Morton Wilfred Bloomfield	Ohio State University	Intellectual background and content of the 14th-century English poem Piers Plowman	Also won in 1964	
Humanities	Medieval Literature	Cora Elizabeth Lutz	Wilson College	Education in the Middle Ages	Also won in 1954	
Humanities	Medieval Literature	Walter J. Ong	Saint Andrew Bobola House Boston	Peter Ramus and his place in English literary history	Also won in 1951	
Humanities	Music Research	Beekman Cox Cannon	Yale University	History of church music, 1600 to present	With Leo Franz Schrade	
Humanities	Music Research	Arthur Mendel		Music of Bach in performance		
Humanities	Music Research	Leo Franz Schrade	Yale University	History of church music from the Christian era to the end of the 16th century	With Beekman Cox Cannon; also won in 1951 and 1956	
Humanities	Near Eastern Studies	Kenneth Meyer Setton	University of Manitoba	Athens in the Middle Ages	Also won in 1950	
Humanities	Philosophy	Morton Gabriel White	Harvard University	Philosophical critique of certain 20th-century American social thinkers		
Humanities	Russian History	Bertram D. Wolfe			Also won in 1950 and 1953	
Humanities	Spanish and Portuguese Literature	María Rosa Lida de Malkiel		The Alexander legend reinterpreted in old Spanish literature	Also won in 1950	
Humanities	United States History	Paul Wallace Gates	Cornell University	Agricultural history of the United States, 1815-1860		
Humanities	United States History	Helene Maxwell Hooker		Francis J. Heney		
Humanities	United States History	Arthur Stanley Link	Princeton University	Woodrow Wilson		
Humanities	United States History	Arthur P. Whitaker	University of Pennsylvania	Spread of the 18th-century Enlightenment	Also won in 1929	
Humanities	United States History	Charles Maurice Wiltse			Also won in 1950	
Natural Science	Chemistry	Simon Harvey Bauer	Cornell University	Mechanisms of vibrational energy transfer between molecules upon collision, and a book on physical methods for the determination of molecular structures		
Natural Science	Chemistry	Leo Brewer	University of California, Berkeley	Spectroscopic technique applied to thermodynamic studies of chemical systems at high temperatures approaching those of the stars		
Natural Science	Chemistry	Marvin Carmack	University of Pennsylvania	Chemistry of natural products		
Natural Science	Chemistry	Frederick Otto Koenig	Stanford University	Principles of electrochemical thermodynamics	Also won in 1950	
Natural Science	Chemistry	Melvin Spencer Newman				
Natural Science	Chemistry	Cyrias Ouellet	Laval University			
Natural Science	Chemistry	Henry Taube	University of Chicago		Also won in 1955	
Natural Science	Chemistry	David Herschel Volman	University of California, Davis	Mechanisms and kinetics of the photochemical reactions of gaseous hydrogen peroxide		
Natural Science	Chemistry	Edgar Bright Wilson, Jr.	Harvard University	Methods of science	Also won in 1970	
Natural Science	Chemistry	László Zechmeister				
Natural Science	Earth Science	Howel Williams	University of California, Berkeley	Field study of certain volcanic regions in Mexico and Central America	Also won in 1957	
Natural Science	Mathematics	Wilfred Kaplan	University of Michigan			
Natural Science	Mathematics	Stephen Cole Kleene	University of Wisconsin			
Natural Science	Mathematics	George Whitelaw Mackey	Harvard University	Theory of topological groups and functional analysis	Also won in 1961 and 1970	
Natural Science	Medicine and Health	Sidney Raffel	Stanford University	Chemical factor responsible for the pathogenicity of the human tubercle bacillus		
Natural Science	Molecular and Cellular Biology	William C. Boyd	Boston University School of Medicine	Blood groups, particularly Rh types in populations of Near East and Africa		
Natural Science	Molecular and Cellular Biology	Michael Doudoroff	University of California, Berkeley	Formation and function of microbial enzymes involved in carbohydrate metabolism		
Natural Science	Molecular and Cellular Biology	Irving Goodman			Also won in 1950	
Natural Science	Molecular and Cellular Biology	Irwin Clyde Gunsalus	Indiana University		Also won in 1959 and 1967	
Natural Science	Molecular and Cellular Biology	Abraham Mazur				
Natural Science	Molecular and Cellular Biology	Claude Alvin Villee, Jr.	Harvard Medical School	Chemistry and metabolism of nucleoproteins		
Natural Science	Molecular and Cellular Biology	Hans Handforth Zinsser	University of Pennsylvania Medical School	Theoretical physical chemistry	Also won in 1950	
Natural Science	Neuroscience	Elwood Henneman				
Natural Science	Organismic Biology and Ecology	Elmer Grimshaw Butler				
Natural Science	Organismic Biology and Ecology	George E. Erikson	Harvard Medical School	Comparative anatomy of the New World primates		
Natural Science	Organismic Biology and Ecology	George Evelyn Hutchinson	Yale University	Lakes		
Natural Science	Organismic Biology and Ecology	George Robert Lunz	Bears Bluff National Fish Hatchery	Development of methods of oyster cultivation		
Natural Science	Organismic Biology and Ecology	Frank Alois Pitelka	University of California, Berkeley	Distribution, comparative ecology, phylogeny, and taxonomy of the American jays		
Natural Science	Organismic Biology and Ecology	Robert Cyril Stebbins	University of California, Berkeley	Distribution, structure, habits, and ecological requirements of amphibian and reptile species inhabiting North America		
Natural Science	Physics	Wendell Hinkle Furry	Harvard University	Interaction of radiation, electrons, and other elementary particles		
Natural Science	Physics	Emil Jan Konopinski	Indiana University			
Natural Science	Physics	Harald Herborg Nielsen	Ohio State University	Higher order interactions in polyatomic molecules		
Natural Science	Physics	Dorothy Walcott Weeks	Wilson College	Zeeman effect		
Natural Science	Physics	John Archibald Wheeler			Also won in 1946	
Natural Science	Plant Sciences	Muriel Virginia Bradley	University of California, Berkeley	Effect of normal and abnormal differences in chromosome number and nuclear structure on differentiation of cells		
Natural Science	Plant Sciences	David R. Goddard	University of Pennsylvania	Plant respiration		
Natural Science	Plant Sciences	George Frederik Papenfuss	University of California, Berkeley	Marine algae of South Africa		
Natural Science	Plant Sciences	Bernice Giduz Schubert	Harvard University	Monograph of the genus Desmodium of the Leguminosae		
Natural Science	Plant Sciences	Marta Sherman Walters	University of California, Berkeley	Meiosis in a group of interspecific grass hybrids		
Natural Science	Statistics	John Wilder Tukey	Princeton University			
Social Sciences	Anthropology and Cultural Studies	Luther S. Cressman	University of Oregon	Relation of early South-Central Oregon cultures to those of other areas	Also won in 1940	
Social Sciences	Anthropology and Cultural Studies	George M. Foster, Jr.		Research in Spain		
Social Sciences	Anthropology and Cultural Studies	Emil Walter Haury	University of Arizona	Chronology of cultures in the Andean region of South America		
Social Sciences	Anthropology and Cultural Studies	David G. Mandelbaum	University of California, Berkeley	Kota people of South India		
Social Sciences	Economics	Earl Francis Beach	McGill University	Application of higher mathematics to problems in economic		
Social Sciences	Economics	Raymond Adrien de Roover	Wells College	Operation of commercial capitalism and of business organization in the Middle Age	Also won in 1952	
Social Sciences	Economics	Daniel Marx, Jr.	Dartmouth College	Effects of international shipping conferences		
Social Sciences	Economics	Tibor Scitovsky	Stanford University	Economic cost of industrial development and reconstruction in France and Great Britain, with special reference to its theoretical implications		
Social Sciences	Education	Robert King Hall			Also won in 1945 and 1952	
Social Sciences	Law	Philip B. Kurland	Kurland and Wolfson		Also won in 1955	
Social Sciences	Political Science	M. Margaret Ball	Wellesley College	Regionalism in international relations		
Social Sciences	Political Science	Robert MacGregor Dawson	University of Toronto			
Social Sciences	Political Science	John Calyer Ranney	Smith College	British party system and its implications in modern democratic government		
Social Sciences	Political Science	Richard F. Wolfson				
Social Sciences	Psychology	Edward Norton Barnhart	University of California, Berkeley	Character and trend of political debate and discussion on public issues and police in Great Britain		
Social Sciences	Psychology	Hadley Cantril		Social psychology		

== 1949 Latin American and Caribbean Fellows ==
Category	Field of Study	Fellow	Institutional association	Research topic	Notes	Ref
Creative Arts	Music Composition	Roque Cordero		Composing		
Creative Arts	Music Composition	Vicente Salas Viu		Composing		
Creative Arts	Music Composition	Adolfo Salazar		Composing		
Creative Arts	Poetry	Agustí Bartra		Writing	Also won in 1948 and 1960	
Humanities	Intellectual and Cultural History	Juan Larrea			Also won in 1950	
Natural Sciences	Chemistry	Joño Baptista Veiga Salles				
Natural Sciences	Earth Science	Carlos de Paula Couto			Also won in 1951 and 1966	
Natural Sciences	Mathematics	Leopoldo Nachbin			Also won in 1957 and 1958	
Natural Sciences	Medicine and Health	José Pisanty Ovadía				
Natural Sciences	Molecular and Cellular Biology	Hermann Niemeyer Fernández				
Natural Sciences	Molecular and Cellular Biology	Roberto Luiz Pimenta de Mello			Also won in 1948	
Natural Sciences	Molecular and Cellular Biology	Raúl Esteban Trucco			Also won in 1950	
Natural Sciences	Organismic Biology and Ecology	Ernesto Gutiérrez Ballesteros				
Natural Sciences	Organismic Biology and Ecology	John Lane				
Natural Sciences	Organismic Biology and Ecology	José Oiticica Filho			Also won in 1947	
Natural Sciences	Organismic Biology and Ecology	Abelardo Moreno Bonilla			Also won in 1950	
Natural Sciences	Organismic Biology and Ecology	Arístides Herrer Alva				
Natural Sciences	Organismic Biology and Ecology	Juan José Parodiz				
Natural Sciences	Organismic Biology and Ecology	Llewellyn Ivor Price				
Natural Sciences	Organismic Biology and Ecology	Paulo Emilio Vanzolini			Also won in 1955 and 1958	
Natural Sciences	Plant Sciences	Jesús M. Idrobo Muñoz				
Social Sciences	Anthropology and Cultural Studies	Aníbal Buitrón Cháves				

== See also ==
- Guggenheim Fellowship
- List of Guggenheim Fellowships awarded in 1948
- List of Guggenheim Fellowships awarded in 1950
