= Lidia Peradotto =

Italian-Argentine logician

- Born: 1892; Turin, Italy
- Died: 2 September 1951 (aged 58–59); Buenos Aires, Argentina
- Occupations: Logician, Educator
- Years active: 1917–1951

Lidia Peradotto (1892–1951) was an Italian-Argentine logician, the first author of a work on logic in Argentina and the only female member of the Colegio Novecentista, an antipositivist youth intellectual association in Argentina in the 1917–1921 period. She has been called "the single strongest intellectual and, possibly, moral influence" on Argentine philologist María Rosa Lida de Malkiel.

Peradotto was born in 1892 in Turin, but later moved to Argentina with two sisters and became a naturalized Argentine citizen. In 1919, she was rector of the Liceo de Señoritas de La Plata, a girls' high school where Lida de Malkiel later studied, and vice president of the university student section of the Ateneo Hispano-Americano de Buenos Aires. She defended her doctoral dissertation, La logística, in 1924, and published it a year later through the press of the University of Buenos Aires. It has been described as the first published work of any length on symbolic logic in Argentina.

She was named as a professor in 1943, and given the chair for logic in the faculty of philosophy at the University of Buenos Aires.

She died on 2 September 1951 in Buenos Aires.
