= Margaret Ball (disambiguation) =

Margaret Ball (1515–1584) was an Irish Catholic martyr.

Margaret Ball may also refer to:

- Margaret Ball (writer) (born 1947), American writer
- M. Margaret Ball (1909–1999), American political scientist
