= Ben Weber (composer) =

American composer

- Born: William Jennings Bryan Weber; July 23, 1916; St. Louis
- Died: June 16, 1979 (aged 62); New York City)
- Occupation: Composer

William Jennings Bryan "Ben" Weber (July 23, 1916 in St. Louis – June 16, 1979 in New York City) was an American composer.

Weber He was "one of the first Americans to embrace the 12-tone techniques of Schoenberg, starting in 1938"; he was largely self-taught. He worked initially as a copyist and only came to recognition in the 1950s.

Weber used the twelve-tone technique but, rather than avoid tonality, he worked with it and achieved a virtuoso Romantic style: "Weber could not stifle his bent for expansive lyricism and bold gestures," wrote music critic Anthony Tommasini, adding: "One gets the sense that his adaptation of the 12-tone technique was his way of ensuring that his music would keep its cutting edge and not slip into Romanticism. There is a rather Brahmsian spirit trying to emerge here." He composed chamber music for various combinations of instruments, orchestral music including concertos for violin and piano, piano music, and songs.

Weber also wrote an unpublished memoir, How I Took 63 Years to Commit Suicide (as told to Matthew Paris).

== Awards ==
Weber was awarded a Guggenheim Fellowship in 1950. He received a Thorne Music Award in 1965,. which was given to composers of “mature years and recognized accomplishments".

== Compositions ==
(in chronological order)

- op.1: Three songs for contralto and piano (texts by Robert Browning and Edward Short) (1936/40)
- o. op.: To a golden-haired girl, for voice and piano (text by Nicholas Vachel Lindsay)
- o. op. : Autumn
- o. op. : Legende for violin and piano
- op.2: Five Bagatelles for piano (4/1939)
- o. op.: Two pieces for clarinet and piano
- op.3: Pastorale and Scherzino for woodwinds
- op.4: Fantasie for violin and piano
- op.5: Violin sonata No.1 (1939)
- op.6: Three songs for soprano and piano (texts by Ben Weber and Rainer Maria Rilke) (1940)
- op.7: Lyric piece for string quartet (1940)
- op.8: Suite for piano
- op.9: Pastorale for violin and piano
- op.10: Lied des Idioten, for soprano and orchestra (text by Rainer Maria Rilke)
- op.11a: Variations for piano, violin, clarinet and cello (1941)
- op.11b: Concertino for violin, clarinet and cello
- op.12: String quartet No.1
- op.13: Five pieces for cello and piano
- op.14: Divertimento for 2 solo celli
- op.15: Five songs for voice and piano (texts by Adelaide Crapsey) (1941)
- op.16: Violin sonata No.2 (1940–42, rev. 1943)
- op.17: Cello sonata No.1 (1941)
- o. op.: Piece (later called: Ballade) for oboe and orchestra (1943)
- op.18: Chorale and Variations for cello and piano
- o. op.: Ballade for cello and piano
- o. op.: Intermezzo for clarinet and piano
- op.19: String trio (1944)
- op.20: Wie kann ich bleich, for voice and piano (German text by Ben Weber)
- op.21: Sinfonia for cello and orchestra (1945)
- op.22: Variations for oboe and string quartet (1944)
- op.23: Three piano pieces (1946)
- op.24: String trio
- op.25: Fantasia (Variations) for piano
- op.26: Ballet: The Pool of Darkness, for flute, violin, trumpet, bassoon, cello and piano
- op.26a: Episodes for piano (Piano version of Ballet Pool of Darkness) (1957)
- op.27: Suite for piano No.2 (1948)
- op.28: Dance for cello
- op.29: Concert Aria after Solomon, for soprano, wind quintet, violin, cello and piano (text from the bible, song of Solomon)
- op.30: Sonata da camera for violin and piano
- op.31: Dance No.2 for cello
- op.32: Concerto for piano solo, cello and woodwind quintet
- op.33: Symphony in four movements on Poems of William Blake
- op.34: Two pieces for string orchestra (1950)
- op.35: String quartet No.2
- op.36: Closing piece, for organ solo
- op.37: Colloquy, for brass septet
- op.38: Ballade for 2 pianos
- op.39: Serenade for harpsichord, flute, oboe and cello (1953)
- op.40: Four songs for tenor or soprano and cello (texts by Ezra Pound, Euenus, Hadrian, Bhāsa)
- op.41: Concerto for violin and orchestra (1954) (WP: 1973, Daniel Kobialka (violin), Atlanta Symphony Orchestra, Robert Shaw (conductor))
- op.42: Prelude and Passacaglis for orchestra (1954)
- op.43/1: Madrigal No.1 Ah, Dear Heart for SATB chorus (text by John Donne)
- op.43/2: Madrigal No.2 Sonnet to Orpheus for SATB chorus (text by Rainer Maria Rilke)
- op.44: Serenade for string quintet
- op.44a: New Adventures, for piano
- op.45: Concertino for flute, oboe, clarinet and string quartet (1956)
- op.46: Serenade for strings
- op.47: Rapsodie concertante for viola and small orchestra (1957)
- op.48: Three songs for soprano and strings (1958) (texts by Stefan George, Rainer Maria Rilke, Richard Dehmel)
- op.49: Humoresque for piano
- op.50: String quartet No.3 (1959)
- op.51: Chamber fantasie for solo violin and small ensemble (1959)
- op.52: Two songs for voice and piano (texts by John Dowland and Ausonius)
- op.53: Piano concerto (1961)
- op.54: The Ways, for voice and piano (text by Pauline Hanson)
- op.55: Nocturne for flute, celesta and cello (1963)
- op.56: Suite for piano four hands
- op.57: A bird came down the walk, for mezzo-soprano and piano (1963) (text by Emily Dickinson)
- op.58: Dolmen, for winds and strings (1964)
- op.59: Four songs (1966)
- op.60: The enchanted midnight, for orchestra (1967)
- op.61: Dramatic piece for violin and orchestra (1970)
- op.62: Sinfonia Clarion, for orchestra (1973)
- op.63: Two songs for voice and piano (text by J. Mayhall)
- op.64: Intermezzo for piano (1972)
- op.65: Variazioni quasi una fantasia for harpsichord (1974)
- op.66: Consort of Winds, for wind quintet (1974)
- op.67: Capriccio for cello and piano (1977)
- op.68: Ciaconna for piano (1979, incomplete)

== Links ==
- 2012 article by Roger Trefousse
- List of compositions published by American Composers Edition (BMI)
