= Dorothy Walcott Weeks =

American mathematician (1893–1990)

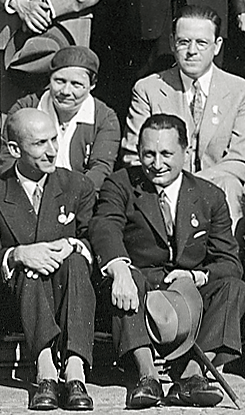
- Left to right, upper: Dorothy Walcott Weeks, David Morse, lower: Bronisław Knaster, Kazimierz Kuratowski, at the International Mathematical Congress, Zürich 1932
- Born: May 3, 1893; Philadelphia, PA
- Died: June 4, 1990 (aged 97); Newton, MA
- Education: Wellesley College (1916, BA); Massachusetts Institute of Technology (1923, MS; 1930, PhD); Simmons College (1925, MS)
- Awards: Guggenheim fellow; Wellesley College Alumnae Achievement Award
- Scientific career
- Fields: Physics
- Workplaces: Massachusetts Institute of Technology; Watertown Arsenal; Wilson College; US Patent Office
- Thesis: A study of the interference of polarized light by the method of coherency matrices (1930)
- Doctoral advisor: Norbert Wiener
- Notable students: Pauline Morrow Austin

Dorothy Walcott Weeks (May 3, 1893 – June 4, 1990) was an American mathematician and physicist. Weeks was born in Philadelphia, Pennsylvania. She earned degrees from Wellesley College, the Massachusetts Institute of Technology, and Simmons College. Weeks was the first woman to receive a PhD in mathematics from the Massachusetts Institute of Technology.

== Early life ==
Dorothy Walcott Weeks was born on May 3, 1893, in Philadelphia, Pennsylvania, to Mary (nee Walcott) and Edward Mitchell Weeks, an engraver. Weeks was the second of three children, born after her older brother and before her younger sister Ruth. Weeks' older brother Robert attended the Massachusetts Institute of Technology (MIT), earning a bachelor's degree in 1913 and a master's degree in 1914. Her sister, Ruth, graduated from Wellesley College in 1919. The family moved in 1900 from Cheltenham to Washington, D.C., where Weeks studied at Western High School. When the family decided to move to Washington DC, her father took up a job as an engraver at the Bureau and Printing which led him to work on the design of the dollar bill and even print a copy of the Declaration of Independence on a steel plate for FDR. Dorothy's older brother was heavily involved in math and science. Like most young boys during this time, he got a job delivering newspapers. He used the money from his job to buy the best scientific articles and perform the experiments in the attic. His senior year of high school, he gave an electrical show for the community to come see. Her and her brother were close even if he got upset at her messing with his gadgets. In Week's free time, she would play tennis with the local girls in the area. She also learned to cook, which she enjoyed very much. During her time in high school, Dorothy would enjoy going out dancing, playing basketball, going to the gym, and rope climbing.

== Education ==
By 12 years old, Weeks knew that mathematics was her calling. Her ability blossomed in 7th grade and led her to having a strong space factor emerged in geometry sophomore year. At Western High School, they offered two years of chemistry and two years of physics. Weeks took the two years of chemistry and then was permitted to take qualitative analysis. This course was spread over a year, at Weeks' own pace, but she finished by Christmas time. She never took a single class of physics in high school. During Weeks' time at Western High School, she became close to a mathematics teacher named Nannie J. McKnight. McKnight was a major factor in Weeks' love for math and science and encouraged her to enroll at Wellesley College in those subjects.

Weeks graduated Phi Beta Kappa with a physics degree from Wellesley College in 1916, where she was also an active member of the Shakespeare society. After graduation, Weeks went on to work as a teacher, a statistical clerk, and an assistant at the National Bureau of Standards. In 1917 she became the third woman to work as a patent examiner at the US Patent Office.

In 1920 Weeks worked as a lecturer at the Massachusetts Institute of Technology and earned a master's degree in physics from that same institution in 1923. In 1924 she obtained a second master's degree, from the Prince School of Business at Simmons College, and became an employment supervisor for Jordan Marsh, the Boston department store. But by 1928, she had returned to academia, teaching physics at Wellesley College while working on her doctorate at the Massachusetts Institute of Technology.

In 1930, Weeks completed a PhD in theoretical physics from the mathematics department at the Massachusetts Institute of Technology. Her dissertation work was guided by Norbert Wiener and published in the Journal of Mathematics and Physics.

== Career ==
Following completion of graduate studies, Weeks developed and led the physics department at Wilson College in Chambersburg, Pennsylvania, from 1930 to 1956. Weeks left Wilson on sabbatical from 1943 to 1945, when she worked as a technical aide at the Office of Scientific Research and Development. Later, in 1949–50, Weeks was a Guggenheim Fellow at the Massachusetts Institute of Technology. While at Wilson in the 1940s, Weeks organized six summer sessions in which undergraduate women traveled to the Massachusetts Institute of Technology to work with George R. Harrison in the spectroscopy laboratory on compiling wavelength tables. Harrison referred to this as the "Charm School." Among the undergraduate students who participated was Katherine Sopka.

From 1956 through 1964, Weeks was a physicist at the Watertown Arsenal and the technical representative for the Committee on Radioactive Shielding. In 1964, she worked for the NASA supported Solar Satellite Project at the Harvard College Observatory. From 1966 to 1971 Weeks worked as a lecturer in physics at the Newton College of the Sacred Heart. She would continue to work at Harvard as a spectroscopist, studying solar satellites at the Harvard College Observatory until she retired in 1976 at the age of eighty-three.

== Retirement and Late Life ==
Dorothy Walcott Weeks retired from Wilson College in 1956. She then moved to Wellesley Massachusetts, living with her previous physics teacher, mentor, and long-time friend Louise McDowell. The pair enjoyed an active lifestyle, traveling, as well as recreation, even purchasing a New Hampshire summer cabin together in 1946. Weeks primarily lived in Wellesley, where she became a well-respected NASA physicist and spectroscopist. In 1962, while employed by the United States Army, Weeks led a team which worked to find materials that defended against nuclear weapons, which was of utmost importance in a Cold War-era America. After her time at NASA and the Army, in 1966, she became a lecturer at Newton College of the Sacred Heart until 1971.

Outside of academia, Weeks was a champion for women's rights, primarily the right to upper level schooling. Weeks was an active member and the treasurer of the American Association of University Women, as well as being involved in the International Federation of University Women. Both of these organizations campaigned for the acceptance, inclusion, and promotion of women in academia. Weeks was also the president of the Central Pennsylvania Section of the American Association of Physics Teachers, which provided furthering education courses for physics faculty, expanding the field of physics to better reach the nations youth. She wrote several articles, including a piece about the struggles of women in the science fields, which was published in Physics Today in 1960. A collection of Weeks' written works, including a personal memoir written during retirement, is currently held at MIT. Weeks died in Newton, Massachusetts in 1990 at the age of ninety-seven.

== Publications ==
- Dorothy W. Weeks, "Three Mathematical Methods of Analyzing Polarized Light," Journal of Mathematics and Physics, Volume 13, Issue 4, (December 1934): 371-379.
- Dorothy W. Weeks, "A study of sixteen coherency matrices," Journal of Mathematics and Physics, Volume 13, Issue 4, (December 1934): 380-386.
- Henry Norris Russell, Charlotte E. Moore, and Dorothy W. Weeks, "The Arc Spectrum of Iron (Fe 1)," Transactions of the American Philosophical Society, New Series, Philadelphia: American Philosophical Society, (1944).
- Dorothy W. Weeks, "Central Pennsylvania Section," American Journal of Physics, Volume 22, Number 3 (March 1954): 148-151.
- Dorothy W. Weeks, "Central Pennsylvania Section," American Journal of Physics, Volume 22, Number 6 (September 1954): 424-426.
- Dorothy W. Weeks, "Women in Physics Today," Physics Today, Volume 13, Issue 8, (1960): 22-23.
- Dorothy W. Weeks, "Absorption Spectrum of Fe I in the Vacuum Ultraviolet," Astronomical Journal, Volume 70 (1965): 696.
- Dorothy W. Weeks, "Women in Physics," Physics Today, Volume 40, Issue 6 (1987): 15.
