= Leo Smit (American composer) =

American composer and pianist

Leo Smit (January 12, 1921 – December 12, 1999) was an American composer and pianist.

== Life ==
Leo Smit was born in Philadelphia, Pennsylvania. As a child his mother took him to the Soviet Union where he studied with the composer Dmitri Kabalevsky. He later studied piano in New York with Isabella Vengerova and José Iturbi and composition with Nicolas Nabokov. While working as George Balanchine's rehearsal pianist, he met Igor Stravinsky.

He often gave thematic recitals—sometimes illustrated with his own slides—and performed a great deal of new music, especially works by Aaron Copland. His breakthrough as a composer came in 1957, when the Boston Symphony Orchestra played his First Symphony. In that year he moved to Los Angeles to teach at the University of California, Los Angeles. From 1962 he taught at the State University of New York at Buffalo. He wrote two operas: The Alchemy of Love (1969), in collaboration with the British astronomer Sir Fred Hoyle, with whom he also worked on an oratorio about Copernicus; and Magic Water (1978). Later in his life, he composed nearly 100 songs to texts by Emily Dickinson.

During recording sessions in 1978 and 1993, he recorded the complete solo piano music of Copland for Sony Classical, which has been issued as a 2-CD set. David Dubal praised these performances as "vivid, beautifully proportioned, and poetic", and Copland himself said, "Smit's brilliant and perceptive performances of my piano works are absolutely outstanding."

He was also a talented photographer, taking many pictures of notable musicians. He died in Encinitas, California, at the age of 78, of congestive heart failure.

== Awards ==
- 1950 Guggenheim Fellowship
- 1973 Rome Prize
