= Helaine Newstead =

Scholar of medieval literature

- Born: 1906; New York City, New York, US
- Died: October 2, 1981 (aged 75); New York City, New York, US

Academic background
- Education: Hunter College; Columbia University
- Doctoral advisor: Roger Sherman Loomis

Academic work
- Discipline: Literature
- Sub-discipline: Medieval literature
- Institutions: Hunter College; Graduate Center, CUNY

Helaine H. Newstead (1906–1981) was an American scholar of medieval literature. She was awarded a Guggenheim Fellowship in 1948 for her work. She was the first American and the first woman to serve as president of the International Arthurian Society (from 1972 to 1974).

== Early life and education ==
Helaine Newstead was born in New York City. She attended Hunter High School and Hunter College (BA 1927) and Columbia University (MA 1928, PhD 1939). She learned to speak or read an array of European languages, including Old French, Old Irish, Old Norse, and Latin Anglo-Norman, for her work with medieval texts. Her dissertation, completed under advisor Roger Sherman Loomis, was published as Bran the Blessed in Arthurian Romance (1939).

== Career ==
She taught at Hunter College beginning in 1928, and was promoted to full professor there in 1954. In the 1960s she moved to the faculty of the Graduate Center of the City University of New York, where she was in charge of the English doctoral program from 1962 to 1969, and the comparative literature doctoral program from 1974 to 1976. She retired in 1976, but continued to teach until 1981.

In 1948, Helaine Newstead was awarded a Guggenheim Fellowship to focus on the Tristan legend. In 1950, she was elected president of the Medieval Club of New York. She became the first American and the first woman to be president of the International Arthurian Society in 1972. Other career honors included an honorary Doctor of Letters from the University of Wales (1969), the President's Medal from Hunter College (1970), and the Chancellor's Medal from City University of New York (1981).

Philologist David Greetham recalled Newstead as "a sort of medievalist queen bee at the centre of a network of scholars" in her medieval colloquium at City University. Among her notable students were poet Paul Mariani and culinary historian Constance Hieatt.

== Legacy ==
Helaine Newstead died on October 2, 1981, aged 75 years. In her memory, three Helaine Newstead Dissertation Fellowships were established at the City University of New York. A volume of essays in her honor was published by her colleagues in 1992.
