= Katherine Sopka =

Katherine Sopka (born Katherine J. Russell) was a science interviewer, physics professor and historian of physics. She is known for her interviews held with leading scientists, and for work on the history of quantum physics and the physics community in the U.S. in the 1920s and 1930s.

== Life ==
Katherine was born fourth of six children in Dorchester, Boston, and attended Girl's Latin School in Boston. She studied at Radcliffe College, where she obtained her bachelor's degree in physics.

She married John J. Sopka in 1943, and the couple subsequently moved to Dayton, Ohio, where her husband worked with the Manhattan Project until the end of the war. They both intended to complete their graduate degrees and returned to Harvard, where Katherine earned her master's degree in physics and John his Ph.D. in mathematics.

Sopka taught physics at Newark State Teachers College and later at the University of Colorado at Boulder (CU). There she worked with Frank Oppenheimer and David Hawkins on developing a curriculum for physics instruction in relation to a project of the Physical Science Study Committee.

Under the supervision of Gerald Holton in the History of Science Department of Harvard University, she studied the theoretical physics community in the U.S. and its dependence on the European physics community of the 1920s. She obtained her Ph.D. in history of science and education at Harvard University in 1976 with her dissertation entitled Quantum Physics in America: 1920–1935.

She actively worked on physics curriculum development, participating in the Harvard Project Physics. She interviewed noted scientists and worked as editor for the American Institute of Physics books series History of Modern Physics.

She died on 30 July 2009 in Salem, Massachusetts.

== Oral history transcripts ==
Sopka recorded her interviews, which became part of physics' oral history. They are archived with the Niels Bohr Library & Archives of the Center for History of Physics, American Institute of Physics, College Park, MD USA.

In 1979 she spoke with Mildred Allen. Alice Armstrong, Dorothy Heyworth,

In 1978, she interviewed Lucy Wilson and Dorothy Weeks

In 1977 her subjects included Melba Phillips, Janet Guernsey, Edward Purcell, Nicolaas Bloembergen, Kenneth T. Bainbridge, John H. Van Vleck, Sidney Coleman, and Gerald Holton

In 1976 she talked with Sheldon Glashow, Norman Ramsey, Jabez Curry Street, and Edwin Kemble.

== Publications ==
=== Books ===
- Katherine Russell Sopka: Quantum physics in America: the years through 1935, Thomash Publishers, 1988, ISBN 978-0-88318-553-7
- Katherine Russell Sopka (ed.): Physics for a new century: papers presented at the 1904 St. Louis congress, Tomash Publishers, 1986, ISBN 978-0-88318-487-5
- Katherine Russell Sopka: Making contributions: an historical overview of women's role in physics, American Association of Physics Teachers, 1984, ISBN 978-0-917853-09-8
- Dorothy Weeks, Katherine Russell Sopka: Dorothy Weeks: transcript of an interview taken on a tape recorder on 19 July 1978, Center for History of Physics, American Institute of Physics, 1978
- Katherine Sopka: Quantum Physics in America: 1920–1935 (Doctoral Dissertation, Harvard University, 1976). New York: American Institute of Physics and Tomash Publishers (Book review by David C. Cassidy, The British Journal for the History of Science, 1982, 15, pp. 202–204)
- Katherine Sopka: Survey of the physical sciences: PHYS4005, Independent Study Div., New York Institute of Technology, 1973

=== Articles and book chapters (selection) ===
- Katherine R. Sopka, Elisabeth M. Sopka, The Bonebreak Theological Seminary: Top-Secret Manhattan Project Site, Physics in Perspective (PIP), Springer, Volume 12, Number 3, pp. 338–349, DOI: 10.1007/s00016-010-0019-4, 2000 (abstract)
- Eli Maor, Katherine R. Sopka: The story of e: e the story of a number, The Physics Teacher, Volume 33, Issue 8, pp. 540, DOI 10.1119/1.2344290, 1995
- Katherine R. Sopka: A man for our time, The Physics Teacher, Volume 24, Issue 3, pp. 188, DOI 10.1119/1.2341980, 1986
- Katherine R. Sopka: A good story, The Physics Teacher, Volume 23, Issue 4, pp. 252–253, DOI: 10.1119/1.2341805, 1985
- Katherine R. Sopka: Three years of Joseph Henry, The Physics Teacher, Volume 25, Issue 4, pp. 254, 10.1119/1.2342239, 1987
- Katherine R. Sopka: Particles or waves?, The Physics Teacher, Volume 22, Issue 5, pp. 336, DOI 10.1119/1.2341564, 1984
- Gerald Holton, Katherine Sopka: Great books of science in the twentieth century: physics. In: Mortimer J. Adler, John Van Doren (eds.): The Great Ideas Today, pp. 224 ff., 1979
- Katherine Sopka: An apostle of science visits America: John Tyndall's journey of 1872–1873, The Physics Teacher, Volume 10, Issue 7, pp. 369–375, 1972 (abstract)
- Katherine J. Sopka: A real enough cleavage, Physics Today, Volume 21, Issue 7, Letters, p. 9, DOI 10.1063/1.3035089, 1968

=== Biographies ===
- Katherine R. Sopka: Biography of Percy Williams Bridgman, Hanneby.com
- Katherine R. Sopka: Biography of Annie Jump Cannon, Hanneby.com
