= One Day on Beetle Rock =

1967 Disney television film

- Genre: Nature documentary
- Based on: One Day on Beetle Rock by Sally Carrighar
- Directed by: Hank Schloss
- Narrated by: Sebastian Cabot
- Composer: Buddy Baker
- Country of origin: United States
- Original language: English

Production
- Producer: James Algar
- Production company: Walt Disney Productions

Original release
- Network: NBC
- Release: November 19, 1967

Related
- A Day in Nature's Community (1975)

One Day on Beetle Rock is a 1967 American television film produced by Walt Disney Productions for Walt Disney's Wonderful World of Color. Directed by Hank Schloss, it aired on NBC on November 19, 1967.

The film was based on the 1944 Sally Carrighar book of the same name.

Produced by James Algar, it was filmed over 18 months at Beetle Rock Forest, which is in the Giant Forest section of Sequoia National Park, within the Sierra Nevada mountains of California. Robert O. Cook handled the sound.

The Sally Carrighar Collection at the Howard Gotlieb Archival Research Center at Boston University preserves material related to this film, as does the Buddy Baker Collection at the New York University Fales Library.

In 1975, Disney released a shortened version of One Day on Beetle Rock as an educational film called A Day in Nature's Community.

The Daily Star called the film "good family fare", The Robesonian enjoyed the "colorful and beautiful outdoor adventure".

== Cast ==
- Sebastian Cabot as the Narrator
- The Robert Bennett family as the picnickers
