= Harold Isaacs =

American writer (1910–1986)

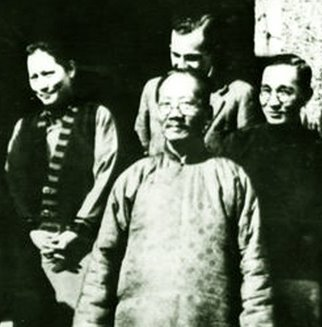
- Isaacs (top, middle) visiting the home of Soong Ching-ling
- Born: Harold Robert Isaacs; 1910
- Died: 1986 (aged 75)
- Education: Columbia University (BA)
- Occupations: Journalist, political scientist
- Spouse: Viola Robinson Isaacs
- Writing career
- Pen name: Lo Sen, Yi Luosheng, Harold Roberts
- Notable works: The Tragedy of the Chinese Revolution; Scratches on Our Minds

Harold Robert Isaacs (September 13, 1910 – July 9, 1986) was an American journalist and political scientist.

== Career ==
Isaacs graduated from Columbia University in 1929, then briefly worked as a reporter for the New York Times. He went to China in 1930 with no strong political views, but became involved with left-wing politics in Shanghai, especially through a friendship with Frank Glass, a Trotskyist from South Africa, and with Agnes Smedley, an American journalist with Communist sympathies.

He wrote The Tragedy of the Chinese Revolution (1938), about the early 1925-27 phases of the Chinese Communist Revolution, which featured a preface by Leon Trotsky. The book includes dramatic descriptions of the Shanghai Massacre of 1927, in which nationalist forces killed thousands of known or suspected communists. Isaacs condemned the leadership of the Chinese Communist Party for following the instructions of Joseph Stalin to ally with the Nationalist Party rather than arming the workers and pursuing a genuinely revolutionary program.

He covered World War II in Southeast Asia and China for Newsweek Magazine. In 1953 he joined the department of political science at the Massachusetts Institute of Technology. In the following years he published Scratches on our Minds: American Images of China and India, American Jews in Israel, and The New World of Negro Americans, among others. Scratches on our Minds was highly influential. By reviewing the popular and scholarly literature on Asia that appeared in the United States, and by interviewing many American experts, Isaacs identified four stages of American attitudes toward China: "benevolence", dominant 1905 to 1937; "admiration" (1937–1944); "disenchantment" (1944–1949); and "hostility" (after 1949).

In 1950, Isaacs was awarded a Guggenheim Fellowship.

== Personal life ==
Isaacs and his wife had two children, journalist Arnold R. Isaacs, and Deborah Shipler, who was married to journalist David K. Shipler.

In 1980, Isaacs returned to China with his wife, Viola, and wrote an account of the visit, Re-Encounters in China.

== Selected articles and works ==
- (editor): Five years of Kuomintang reaction (1932)
- ——— (1938). The Tragedy of the Chinese Revolution. Introduction by Leon Trotsky. London: Secker & Warburg; Reprinted, with a Preface by Arnold Isaacs, Chicago: Haymarket Books, 2009. ISBN 978-1-60846-109-7.; Revised Edition, Stanford University Press, 1951; Second Revised Edition, Stanford University Press, 1961.
- (editor): New cycle in Asia: selected documents in major international development in the Far East, 1943–1947 (1947)
- Two-thirds of the world: problems of a new approach to the peoples of Asia, Africa, and Latin America (1950)
- Africa: new crisis in the making (1952)
- Scratches on our minds: American images of China and India (John Day, 1958); reprinted as Images of Asia : American views of China and India (M.E. Sharpe, 1972)
- Emergent Americans: a report on "Crossroads Africa" (1961)
- The new world of Negro Americans (1964)
- India's ex-Untouchables (1965)
- American Jews in Israel (1967)
- No peace for Asia (1947)
- Straw sandals: Chinese short stories, 1918–1933 (editor)(1974)
- Idols of the tribe: group identity and political change (1975)
- Power and identity: tribalism in world politics (1979)
- ——— (1985). Re-Encounters in China: Notes of a Journey in a Time Capsule. Armonk, NY: M.E. Sharpe. ISBN 1-315-49564-3. (Archive.org)
