= Veridiana Victoria Rossetti =

Brazilian agronomist (1917–2010)

- Born: 15 October 1917; Santa Cruz das Palmeiras, São Paulo state, Brazil
- Died: 26 December 2010 (aged 93); São Paulo, Brazil
- Education: Luiz de Queiroz College of Agriculture, University of São Paulo
- Known for: Work on citrus pests and diseases
- Awards: Brazilian Order of Scientific Merit

Veridiana Victoria Rossetti (1917 - 2010) was a Brazilian agronomist and the first woman in Brazil with a degree in agronomy to practise the profession. She became a world authority on citrus diseases, was a recipient of several national and international awards, and is considered to have made a major contribution to the Brazilian economy and the lives of farmers by helping to reduce the losses experienced by the orange industry in the country.

== Early life ==
Victoria Rossetti, as she signed herself, and liked to be called, was born in Santa Cruz das Palmeiras in São Paulo state in Brazil on 15 October 1917. She was the daughter of Lina Pozzo and Thomaz Rossetti, who were both Italian emigrants. Her father was an agronomist and her grandfather had also been a professor of agronomy. She grew up on her father's farm in Iracemápolis, also in São Paulo state. Together with her brothers, under the guidance of her father, she would collect material to study pests and diseases that affected plants. She went to school initially in Alassio in Liguria in the north of Italy before returning to Brazil to go to school in Limeira and Piracicaba. Following in her family's footsteps, she joined the Luiz de Queiroz College of Agriculture, University of São Paulo in Piracicaba, where she was the first woman to complete an agronomy course in the state of São Paulo and the second in Brazil, in 1937. Her brothers also became agronomists.

== Career ==
Rossetti started as an intern at the Biological Institute in São Paulo in 1940, where she would spend her entire career. She initially worked under the guidance of Agesilau Bitancourt and worked on the isolation of fungi of the Phytophthora genus that causes citrus gummosis. With the emergence of the Citrus tristeza virus in Brazil, she gave priority in her work to the need to develop resistant rootstock.

Rossetti took a course in experimental statistics in 1947 at the University of North Carolina. With a Guggenheim Fellowship, she studied the physiology of Phycomycetes at the University of California, Berkeley, and at University of California, Riverside she specialized in fungi of the Phytophthora genus. In 1960, with support from the Rockefeller Foundation, she visited citrus research stations in Florida and California. In 1961, she was involved with a scientific cooperation programme with the Institut national de la recherche agronomique (INRA) of France to look at citrus viroids. She then trained in techniques for diagnosing viruses transmitted by grafting, with a view to developing the Virus Free Citrus Matrix Registration Programme in the state of São Paulo.

At the Biological Institute, she became head of the General Plant Pathology Section in 1957 and director of the Plant Pathology Division in 1968, a position she was holding when she retired in 1987. Even after retirement she continued her research at the Institute. In 1988 she received the title of Emeritus Servant of the State, granted by the state of São Paulo.

From an early stage of her career Rossetti was a member of the International Committee on Phytophthora Studies. She served as president of the International Organization of Citrus Virologists from 1963 to 1966. She was on the executive committee of the International Citriculture Society and served on several committees of the Food and Agriculture Organization of the United Nations (FAO). Nationally, she served on the Commission to establish the Brazilian Cocoa Research Institute; the National Fruit Growing Commission and the National Citriculture Commission. She was chair of the Standing Committee on Citrus Cancer from 1975 to 1977.

Additionally, Rossetti taught postgraduate classes at several universities and worked as a consultant on problems related to citrus diseases faced by other Brazilian states, as well as Mexico, Peru, and Argentina.

== Research and publications ==
In 1958 Rossetti began research on citrus leprosis disease and experiments to control it. This resulted in confirmation of the Brevipalpus phoenicis mite as a vector of leprosis and, in 1965, as a vector of chlorosis. In 1987 she was asked to identify a new citrus disease that had appeared in the state of São Paulo and named it citrus variegated chlorosis, caused by the bacterium Xylella fastidiosa. She has published or presented at national and international congresses more than 300 works.

== Awards and honours ==
Awards and honours received by Rossetti include:

- Agronomist of the Year 1982, presented by the São Paulo Agronomists Association
- Honorary Doctorate at the University of Florida, 1987
- The Frederico de Menezes Veiga Award, granted by the Brazilian Agricultural Research Corporation (Embrapa) in 1993
- The Luiz de Queiroz Medal in 1999 for her contribution to developing agriculture in São Paulo state
- The Grand Cross of the National Order of Scientific Merit in 2004.

== Death ==
After retiring in 1987, Victoria Rossetti continued working until 2003, when she was diagnosed with Alzheimer's disease. She died on 26 December 2010, of pneumonia.
