= Santa Cruz das Palmeiras =

- Municipality
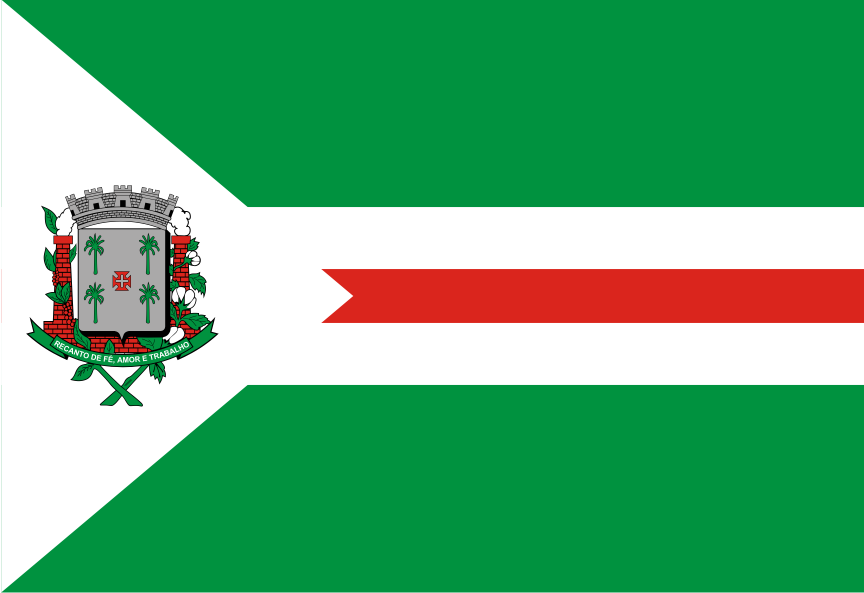
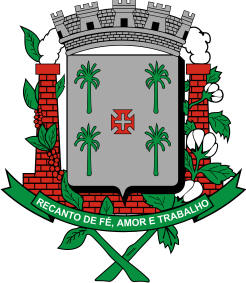
- Flag Coat of arms

- Location in São Paulo state

- Location in Brazil
- Coordinates: 21°49′37″S 47°14′55″W
- Country: Brazil
- Region: Southeast
- State: São Paulo

Area
  - Total: 295 km^{2} (114 sq mi)

Population (2020)
  - Total: 34,737
  - Density: 118/km^{2} (305/sq mi)
- Time zone: UTC−3 (BRT)

Santa Cruz das Palmeiras is a municipality in the state of São Paulo in Brazil. The population is 34,737 (2020 est.) in an area of 295 km^{2} (114 sq mi). The elevation is 635 m.

== Description ==
Santa Cruz is located in the Mojiguaçu River basin and is 30 km far from Anhanguera Highway, in the northeastern of São Paulo state. The high medium temperature is about 32 °C and the minimum is 12 °C, but in the average it's around 20 °C.

Santa has subtropical weather and its topography is flat with gentle undulations and large storm valleys with soil like purple latosoil.

Santa Cruz has seventeen schools (9 of city, 4 of state and 4 privates). It has two Masonic Lodges (Filhos da Luz, of Grand Lodge of São Paulo and Obreiros de Santa Cruz, of Grand Orient of São Paulo/Brazil).

== Origins ==
The origin of the municipality of Santa Cruz das Palmeiras is linked to the settlement started in 1870, when Manuel Valério do Sacramento provided the construction of a small chapel (on 03/05/1876) in honor of Santa Cruz.

The village formed around the chapel came to be called Santa Cruz dos Valérios and progressed with the construction of many houses.

The donation of land for a farm named Palmeiras, proposed by the Countess Maria Eugenia Monteiro de Barros, then owner of part of the farm, boosted the appearance of the city, with the addition of the two names: Santa Cruz das Palmeiras.

May 3 is the anniversary of the city founding.

== Media ==
In telecommunications, the city was served by Telecomunicações de São Paulo. In July 1998, this company was acquired by Telefónica, which adopted the Vivo brand in 2012. The company is currently an operator of cell phones, fixed lines, internet (fiber optics/4G) and television (satellite and cable).

== See also ==
- List of municipalities in São Paulo
