= Yakov Malkiel =

Ukrainian-American linguist (1914–1998)

- Яков Малкиель
- Malkiel receiving his honorary doctorate from the University of Salamanca (1994)
- Born: July 22, 1914; Kyiv, Russian Empire (now Ukraine)
- Died: April 24, 1998 (aged 83)
- Spouse: María Rosa Lida (m. 1948; died 1962)

Academic background
- Education: Humboldt University of Berlin

Academic work
- Discipline: Romance linguistics
- Institutions: University of Wyoming; University of California, Berkeley
- Notable ideas: Lexical polarization

Yakov Lvovich Malkiel (Russian: Яков Львович Малкиель; July 22, 1914 – April 24, 1998) was a Ukrainian-born American Romance etymologist and philologist. His specialty was the development of Latin words, roots, prefixes, and suffixes in modern Romance languages, particularly Spanish. He was the founder of the journal Romance Philology.

Malkiel was born in Kiev to a Russian-Jewish family, and was brought up and educated in Berlin, after the Russian Civil War. Despite an early interest in literature, he ended up studying linguistics at the Humboldt University of Berlin, then known as the Friedrich-Wilhelms-Universität. Being a Jew in 1930s Germany was an obstacle to his education, but one he was able to overcome; his family finally emigrated to the United States in 1940.

After two years unemployed in New York, Malkiel accepted a one-term appointment at the University of Wyoming in Laramie. In 1943, he was offered an initially temporary position at the University of California, Berkeley, which later was converted to a permanent professorship; Malkiel remained there until his retirement in 1983, teaching in the departments of Spanish and (later) Linguistics. He married María Rosa Lida de Malkiel, a philologist and literary critic from Argentina, in 1948.

During a period when etymology was receding from prominence in linguistics, Malkiel was both one of its chief champions and most rigorous theorists. Best known for his work on the role of sound in the development of suffixes, Malkiel coined the term lexical polarization to describe the influence in sound words tend to have over the development of their opposites, when antonyms occur in pairs. A major secondary interest was in the history of his field, explored in the pages of Romance Philology and in his last book, Etymology. His work in all fields was characterized by a doggedly comprehensive use of evidence; of his book, Development of the Latin Suffixes -antia and -entia in Romance Languages, influential linguist Leo Spitzer said in a review, "No one can fail to be impressed by this outstanding example of akribia and scholarly devotion to a task that might have daunted others."

== Major works ==
- Development of the Latin Suffixes -antia and -entia in Romance Languages. Berkeley: University of California Press, 1945.
- The Derivation of Hispanic fealdad(e), fieldad(e), and frialdad(e). Berkeley: University of California Press, 1945.
- Three Hispanic Word Studies. Berkeley: University of California Press, 1947.
- Hispanic algu(i)en and Related Formations. Berkeley, University of California Press, 1948.
- The Hispanic Suffix (i)ego. Berkeley: University of California Press, 1951.
- Studies in the Reconstruction of Hispano-Latin Word Families. Berkeley: University of California Press, 1954.
- Essays on Linguistic Themes. Oxford : Blackwell, 1968.
- Patterns of Derivational Affixation in the Cabraniego Dialect of East-Central Asturian. Berkeley: University of California Press, 1970.
- Etymological Dictionaries: A Tentative Typology. Chicago: University of Chicago Press, 1976.
- A Tentative Autobibliography. Berkeley: University of California Press, 1988.
- Etymology. Cambridge: Cambridge University Press, 1993.
