= Isabel Pope =

American musicologist

- Born: October 19, 1901; Evanston, Illinois, U.S.
- Died: February 7, 1989 (aged 87); Bedford, Massachusetts, U.S.
- Occupations: Musicologist; philologist
- Spouse: Kenneth John Conant (m. 1956; died 1984)
- Awards: Guggenheim Fellowship (1950)

Academic background
- Education: Radcliffe College; Harvard University
- Thesis: Sources of the musical and metrical forms of the medieval lyric in the Hispanic peninsula (1930)

Academic work
- Discipline: Musicology
- Sub-discipline: Spanish song of the Middle Ages and Renaissance
- Institutions: Radcliffe College

Isabel Pope (October 19, 1901 – February 7, 1989) was an American musicologist and philologist who specialized in Spanish song of the Middle Ages and Renaissance. A 1950 Guggenheim Fellow, she was the translator of the 1946 English-language edition of Adolfo Salazar's book La música moderna and she co-edited The Musical Manuscript Montecassino 871 (1979).

== Biography ==
Isabel Pope was born on October 19, 1901 in Evanston, Illinois, daughter of Maud (née Perry) and Herbert Pope, the latter of whom was a lawyer specializing in federal tax law.

She obtained her BA (1923), MA (1925), and PhD in Romance philology (1930) from Radcliffe College; her doctoral dissertation was titled Sources of the musical and metrical forms of the medieval lyric in the Hispanic peninsula. She also attended Harvard University (1935-1936) as a musicology student under Hugo Leichtentritt. She worked at Radcliffe as a tutor from 1935 to 1940, and after returning from an academic trip to Mexico, from 1945 to 1949.

She specialized in the study of Spanish song of the Middle Ages and Renaissance. She wrote a monograph on the villancico, which Gilbert Chase called "one of the most valuable features" of the book it was published in, Cancionero de Upsala (1944). In 1950, she was awarded a Rockefeller Foundation fellowship and a Guggenheim Fellowship, both of which she used for abroad travel to study Spanish music. Among her musicological findings included the 13th-century oral lyric roots of the villancico from two centuries later.

She was the literary editor of Harmonices Musices Odhecaton A, Helen Margaret Hewitt's 1942 edition of the Harmonice Musices Odhecaton, as well as Hans Tischler's published motet collection. She and Masakata Kanazawa were co-editors of The Musical Manuscript Montecassino 871, a 1979 edition of the Cancionero de Montecassino, and she also did academic research on the aforementioned manuscript. She was the translator of W. W. Norton & Company's 1946 English-language edition of the Adolfo Salazar book La música moderna.

In 1956, she married Kenneth John Conant. As of 1958, she lived in Chevy Chase, Maryland.

Pope died on February 7, 1989, in Bedford, Massachusetts.

== Bibliography ==
- (ed. with Helen Margaret Hewitt) Harmonices Musices Odhecaton A (1942)
- (translated) Music in Our Time (1946; original by Adolfo Salazar)
- (ed. with Masakata Kanazawa) The Musical Manuscript Montecassino 871 (1979)
