= Charles M. Rick =

American scientist (1915–2002)

Charles Madera Rick (30 April 1915 – 5 May 2002) was a plant geneticist and botanist who pioneered research on the origins of the tomato. He was widely regarded as the world's leading authority on tomato biology. Born in 1915 in Reading, Pennsylvania, Rick earned a bachelor's degree in horticulture in 1937 from Pennsylvania State University. He earned a doctoral degree in genetics from Harvard University in 1940 and joined the Vegetable Crops Department at the University of California, Davis in 1940. On retirement from the University of California in 1981 he became professor emeritus and continued his research and lecturing for doctoral students till his late days. He died on May 5, 2002, in Davis, California.

== Tomato Research ==
For his research, Professor Rick made expeditions to locations in the Andes and the Galapagos Islands, collecting a diversity of cultivated tomatoes and hundreds of wild tomato species. His research contributed to the areas of plant genetics, evolution, genome mapping and archiving the seeds of tomatoes and related plant species. In 1949 Rick co-founded the Tomato Genetics Cooperative to encourage communication and exchange of research findings among tomato researchers. He published the cooperative's newsletter from its inception in 1951 until 1981.

== Recognition ==
Rick was elected to the US National Academy of Sciences in 1967. The C.M. Rick Tomato Genetics Resource Center at UC Davis, a living genebank of wild relatives, monogenic mutants and miscellaneous genetic stocks of tomato is named for Professor Rick.

Dr. Rick was elected to the National Academy of Sciences in 1967. https://www.nasonline.org/directory-entry/charles-m-rick-jr-t9nnpo/
