= Sally Carrighar =

American writer (1898–1985)

- Education: Wellesley College

Sally Carrighar (1898–1985) was born Dorothy Wagner before adopting her grandmother's name. An American naturalist and writer, she is known for her series of nature books chronicling the lives of wild animals. Born in Cleveland, Ohio, and partially disfigured at birth with nerve damage by the use of high forceps that also broke her mother's coccyx, she had a difficult childhood. During a time of convalescence for heart disease and depression, she "developed a remarkable communication with birds that came to feed at her windowsill and a mouse living in her radio, and in a flash she realized that she could write about birds and animals".

== Life ==
The use of high forceps during her birth "smashed in" part of her face. It was also a traumatic and painful experience for her mother, who never warmed to the child and was verbally and sometimes physically abusive. "A dozen years later," Carrighar's upper jaw had to be reconstructed.

In childhood, her parents moved to East Cleveland. The family's house backed up to the John D. Rockefeller estate rose gardens. Along her walk to school, Carrighar would pass along other parts of the estate noting the "vistas as lovely as landscape architects could create".

She attended Wellesley College for two years and would have graduated with the class of 1922 but had to leave due to sickness.

Carrighar's work is based on years of observation. She spent seven years observing at Beetle Rock in California and ten years in the Arctic before writing her books. They are considered classics of nature writing and may be viewed as a specialized form of travel literature.

She came to nature writing after a series of disheartening jobs.

One reviewer said of her first book: "There is no false sentiment here, no anthropomorphism—it is sound natural history. Yet only an artist could have succeeded so well." Critics said of her first two books that she was "the most imaginative and poetic nature writer in this country", and "like no one else who has ever written about animals, birds, and insects". She was awarded the Guggenheim Fellowship for general nonfiction in 1948 and again in 1949. These awards supported her projects in Alaska, where she lived for nearly a decade.

Carrighar did not marry or have children. She remained close to her younger brother (and only sibling) and his family.

== Bibliography ==
Books

- One Day on Beetle Rock (1944), about animals in the Sierra
- One Day at Teton Marsh (1947), about animals in the Tetons
- Icebound Summer (1953), examines the atmosphere in the part of Alaska that is exposed only during the summer and is similar in style to her first two works as it is about animals in the Arctic. It was adapted into a 1974 television movie called "Two Against the Arctic" that aired on The Wonderful World of Disney.
- Moonlight at Midday (1958), a historical and sociological study of Alaskans during their quest for statehood
- Wild Voice of the North: Chronicle of an Eskimo Dog (1959), profiles her Siberian husky dog that was given to her by neighbors who were moving away
- A Husky in the House (1960)
- The Glass Dove: A Novel of the Underground Railroad (1962), a fiction novel based on her family history
- Wild Heritage (1965), a defense of ethology which is often criticized for imposing human characteristics upon animals
- Home to the Wilderness: A Personal Journey (1973), an autobiography
- The Twilight Seas: A Blue Whale's Journey (1975), focuses on the life of a blue whale, the largest species on earth

Other Writing

- "He Flew into Sunlight" (30 Sept 1945, Harper's Weekly), about an osprey
- "San Francisco's 'Festival of Modern Poetry'" (Poetry Magazine, 1947), a poetry festival review as "one who has directed poetry programs on the radio"
- "Call to a Trumpeter" (1947), a short piece about a trumpeter swan published in the Saturday Evening Post
- "Trout in the Quickening River" (Harper's Weekly, May 1946)
- "Murder in the Schoolroom" (Harper's Weekly, May 1957), humorous short about leading 9-to 12-year-old students in a creative workshop
