= M. Margaret Ball =

American political scientist (1909-1999)

- Born: August 29, 1909; Los Angeles, California, U.S.
- Died: September 14, 1999 (aged 90); Durham, North Carolina, U.S.
- Occupation: Political scientist
- Awards: Guggenheim Fellowship (1949)

Academic background
- Education: Vassar College; Stanford University; University of Cologne
- Thesis: The Anschluss Movement (1935)
- Doctoral advisor: Graham Stuart

Academic work
- Discipline: Political science
- Sub-discipline: International organization studies
- Institutions: Vassar College; Wellesley College; Duke University

Mary Margaret Ball (August 29, 1909 – September 14, 1999) was an American political scientist. A 1949 Guggenheim Fellow, she was author of Post-War German-Austrian Relations (1937), The Problem of Inter-American Organization (1944), International Relations (1956, with Hugh B. Killough), NATO and the European Union Movement (1959), The OAS in Transition (1969), and The 'Open' Commonwealth (1971). She was Ralph Emerson Professor of Political Science at Wellesley College and later served as dean of Duke University Woman's College.

== Biography ==
Ball was born on August 29, 1909, in Los Angeles, California, daughter of Mary Elizabeth (née Messerly) and Jesse W. Ball. After spending a year at Vassar College (1928-1929), she obtained her AB, MA (both 1931), and PhD (1935) from Stanford University. Her doctoral dissertation The Anschluss Movement was supervised by Graham Stuart. She was also a 1932-1933 Carnegie Fellow at University of Cologne, where she got a doctor juris in 1933.

After working at Vassar as a political science instructor since 1935, she moved to Wellesley College in 1936. She was promoted to assistant professor in 1938, associate professor in 1944, and full professor in 1947. In 1956, she became the Ralph Emerson Professor of Political Science, a position she held until she left Wellesley in 1963 to become dean of the Duke University Woman's College and an associate dean of arts and sciences. She became professor of political science in 1968 and retired professor emeritus in 1975. She was a Wellesley College trustee from 1966 to 1970.

Ball specialized in political history, with Katharina Rietzler saying that Ball's work "range[s] from a contemporary history of the political movement that paved the way for Nazi Germany's annexation of Austria in 1938 to books and path-breaking articles on international bodies such as the UN, NATO, and the Organization of American States." She was author of Post-War German-Austrian Relations (1937), The Problem of Inter-American Organization (1944), International Relations (1956, with Hugh B. Killough), NATO and the European Union Movement (1959), The OAS in Transition (1969), and The 'Open' Commonwealth (1971).

Ball has been considered a pioneer in international organization studies, and she was an editorial board member at International Organization from 1947 to 1956. In 1949, she was awarded a Guggenheim Fellowship for a study of regionalism in international relations and international organization". She also worked at the United States Department of State as an international organization specialist in the 1940s, as well as an advisor at the United Nations Conference on International Organization, and at Wellesley, she was a faculty advisor for Carnegie Endowment for International Peace international relations clubs.

In 1960, she was elected a Fellow of the American Academy of Arts and Sciences.

Ball died on September 14, 1999, in Durham, North Carolina.

== Bibliography ==
- Post-War German-Austrian Relations (1937)
- The Problem of Inter-American Organization (1944)
- (with Hugh B. Killough) International Relations (1956)
- NATO and the European Union Movement (1959)
- The OAS in Transition (1969)
- The 'Open' Commonwealth (1971)
