= María Rosa Lida de Malkiel =

Argentine philologist (1910–1962)

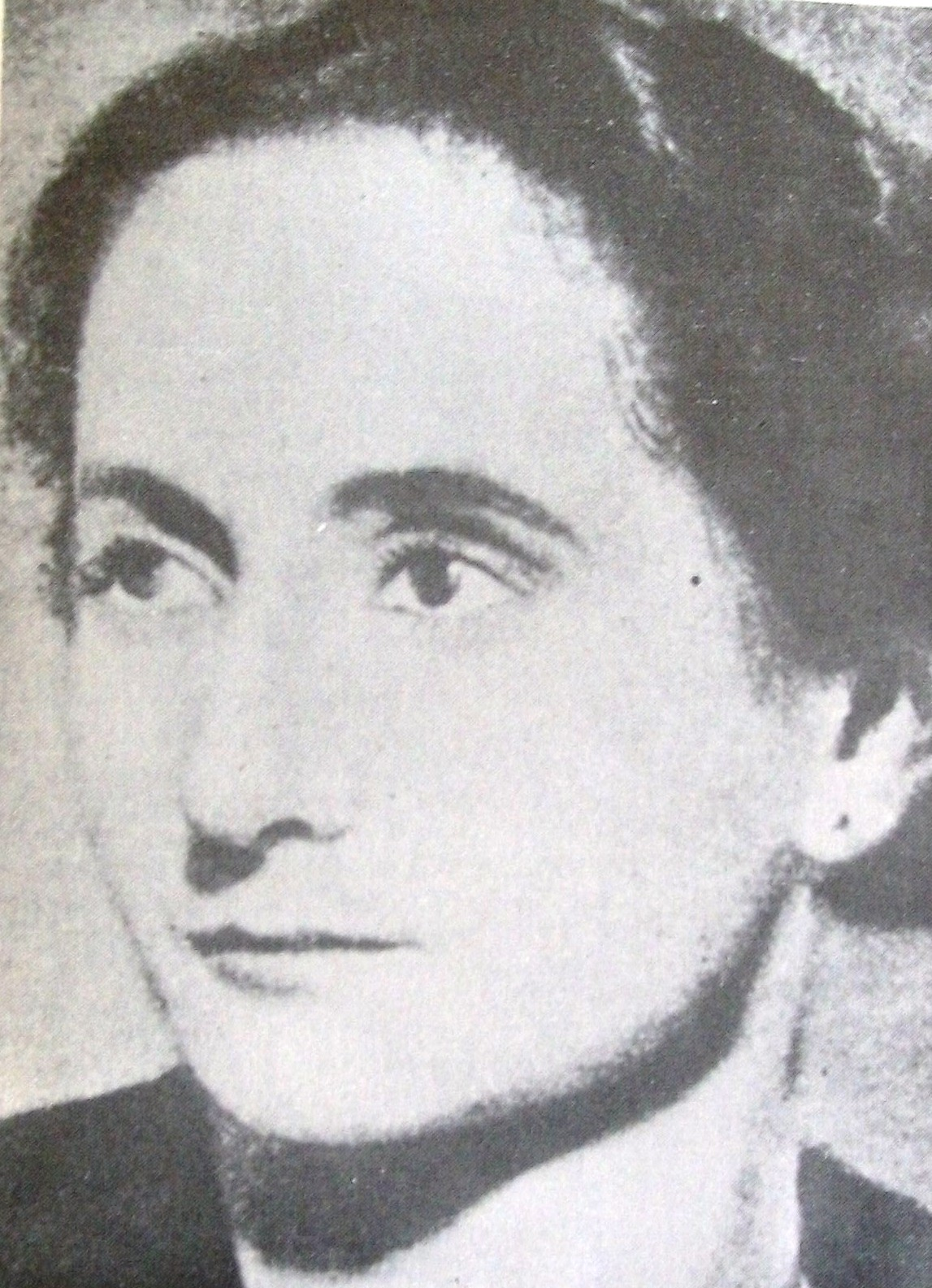
- Born: María Rosa Lida; November 7, 1910; Buenos Aires, Argentina
- Died: September 25, 1962 (aged 51); Oakland, California, U.S.
- Spouse: Yakov Malkiel (m. 1948)
- Relatives: Raimundo Lida (brother)

Academic background
- Education: University of Buenos Aires
- Thesis: Juan de Mena, poeta del Prerrenacimiento español (1947)

María Rosa Lida de Malkiel (née Lida; November 7, 1910 – September 25, 1962), was an Argentine philologist. Notable as an Hispanist medievalist, she came to the United States on a Rockefeller Foundation program of study. Beginning in 1947, Lida de Malkiel lectured for many years in the US, including at Harvard University, the University of California at Berkeley, and Stanford. An advisor to the editorial boards of two professional journals, in the 1950s she was admitted to the Real Academia Española and the Academia Argentina de Letras.

== Early life and education ==
Born María Rosa Lida to a family of Jewish immigrants in Buenos Aires, Argentina, she had two older brothers: Emilio, who became a hematologist, and Raimundo, who became a philologist. Her brothers were born in the Austro-Hungarian Empire, an area now in Ukraine. As a child, she was raised in a family with a strong Jewish identity, who spoke Yiddish as their first language. She graduated from the Liceo Nacional de Señoritas Nº1 José Figueroa Alcorta in 1927. Her best friend during her high school years was Ana Rapaport.

Lida graduated from the Faculty of Arts at the University of Buenos Aires in 1932, winning a prize as best student. She completed her Doctorate in Philology in 1947, summa cum laude, at the Institute of Hispanic Languages and Literatures. Her dissertation was entitled Juan de Mena, poeta del Prerrenacimiento español (Juan de Mena, Poet of the Spanish Pre-Renaissance). She had studied with her brother Raimundo and the philologist Ángel Rosenblat. In 1947 she went to the United States on a post-graduate Rockefeller grant, and studied with Dr. Amado Alonso at Harvard University, where she also began teaching.

== Marriage and family ==
In 1948, Lida married the Ukrainian-born Yakov Malkiel, a scholar of Romance language etymology and philology at the University of California, Berkeley. They had no children.

== Career ==
During the 1930s and 1940s, Lida taught courses in Latin and Greek at the Faculty of Arts at the University of Buenos Aires. She also was studying and teaching medieval Spanish literature. In 1947, she was awarded a Rockefeller grant for post-graduate study in the United States, where she had appointments at Harvard University and the University of California, Berkeley. There she met her future husband, the Romance philologist, Yakov Malkiel. They married in 1948 and settled in Oakland, California. (Her brother Raimundo Lida migrated with his family to Mexico after the nationalization of universities under Perón. In 1953 they went on to the US, where he succeeded Amado Alonso at Harvard.

In the US, Lida de Malkiel taught at the University of California, Berkeley; Harvard University, University of Illinois, Ohio State University and Stanford University, among others. Specializing in Romance philology and recognized as an Arthurian-Hispanist pioneer, Lida de Malkiel was elected to the Real Academia Española in 1953 by direct recommendation of Ramón Menéndez Pidal and the Academia Argentina de Letras in 1959. She served as an advisor on the editorial boards of Nueva Revista de Filología Hispánica, based in Mexico City (1947–1962) and Hispanic Review (1950-), based at the University of Pennsylvania.

She briefly returned to Argentina from the United States in 1961. One of her last works published before she died was an essay: Two Spanish Masterpieces, 'The Book of Good Love' and 'The Celestina'. It collected the six lectures she delivered at the University of Illinois during her tenure as a Miller Visiting professor. She had long been interested in the Spanish classic The Celestina. Lida de Malkiel had worked for 15 years on her book about La Celestina; it was published three months after her death.

== Personal life ==
Lida de Malkiel died of cancer in Oakland. Yakov Malkiel posthumously published many of his wife's papers and unpublished notes.

== Selected works ==
- 1944, Introduction to the theater of Sophocles
- 1949, History of Herodotus, Hellenistic Greek translations
- 1950, Juan de Mena, poeta del Prerrenacimiento español (Juan de Mena, Poet of the Spanish Pre-Renaissance)
- 1961, Two Spanish Masterpieces: The Book of Good Love, and The Celestina
- n.d., Selected Articles on Medieval and Renaissance Spanish Literature

=== Posthumous publication ===
- 1962, La originalidad artistica de La Celestina (The Artistic Originality of 'The Celestina') (completed before her death)
- 1966, Estudios de literatura española y comparada
- 1967, authoritative version of The Tale of Igor's Campaign, the medieval Russian epic), edited with Yakov Malkiel
- 1974, Dido en la literatura española: Su retrato y defensa (Dido in Spanish Literature: Her Portrayal and Defense)
- 1978, Estudios sobre la literatura española del Siglo XV (Studies of the Spanish Literature of the 15th Century)

== Legacy and honors ==
- 1955, Lida de Malkiel was awarded an honorary doctorate from Smith College.
- 1958, Lida de Malkiel was awarded the Achievement Award by the American Association of University Women.
