= List of Guggenheim Fellowships awarded in 1933 =

Thirty-eight scholars, artists, and scientists received Guggenheim Fellowships in 1933. Arnold and Lucile Blanch were the first couple to both win a Guggenheim award in the same year.

== 1933 U.S. and Canadian Fellows ==
Category	Field of Study	Fellow	Institutional association	Research topic	Notes	Ref
Creative Arts	Fiction	Leonard Ehrlich		Writing	Also won in 1934	
Creative Arts	Fiction	Younghill Kang	New York University	East Goes West (published 1937)	Also won in 1934	
Creative Arts	Fiction	Glenway Wescott		Writing		
Creative Arts	Fine Arts	Arnold Blanch	Byrdcliffe Colony	Painting		
Creative Arts	Fine Arts	Lucile Blanch	Byrdcliffe Colony	Painting and lithography		
Creative Arts	Fine Arts	Louis Bouché		Painting		
Creative Arts	Fine Arts	Miguel Covarrubias		Painting	Also won in 1940	
Creative Arts	Fine Arts	Emil Ganso		Painting		
Creative Arts	Fine Arts	Georgina Klitgaard		Painting		
Creative Arts	Fine Arts	Mary Lightfoot Tarleton		Sculpture		
Creative Arts	Fine Arts	Gwen Lux		Sculpture		
Creative Arts	Fine Arts	Carlotta Petrina		Book illustrations	Also won in 1935	
Creative Arts	Music Composition	George Antheil		Composing	Also won in 1932	
Creative Arts	Music Composition	Paul Nordoff		Composing	Also won in 1935	
Creative Arts	Poetry	Louise Bogan		Writing		
Creative Arts	Poetry	E. E. Cummings		Writing	Also won in 1951	
Creative Arts	Poetry	George Dillon		Writing	Also won in 1932	
Humanities	Biography	Matthew Josephson		Benjamin Constant and Germaine de Staël		
Humanities	Classics	Kenneth Scott	Western Reserve University	Religious and political history of the Roman Empire, particularly the development of Roman emperor worship in the 1st century, A.D.		
Humanities	French History	Lowell Joseph Ragatz	George Washington University	Social and economic structure of the French Antilles during the 17th and 18th centuries		
Natural Sciences	Chemistry	Herrick Lee Johnston	Ohio State University	Advances in molecular spectra and their application to problems in chemical equilibria and to photochemistry		
Natural Sciences	Chemistry	Carl Robert Noller	Stanford University	Determination of the constitution of naturally occurring organic compounds, especially the sapogenins and sterols		
Natural Sciences	Mathematics	Charles F. Roos	American Association for the Advancement of Science	Dynamical economics		
Natural Sciences	Organismic Biology and Ecology	Arthur Loveridge	Museum of Comparative Zoology	Vanishing vertebrate fauna of the tropical rain forests remnants in East Africa	Also won in 1938	
Natural Sciences	Physics	Kenneth Bainbridge	Franklin Institute	Nuclear physics	Also won in 1934	
Natural Sciences	Physics	Francis Bitter	Westinghouse Electric & Manufacturing Company	Magnetism, with special reference to the structure of crystals		
Natural Sciences	Physics	Thomas Charles Poulter	Iowa Wesleyan College	Antarctic expedition with Richard Byrd		
Natural Sciences	Plant Sciences	Barbara McClintock	California Institute of Technology	Genetics		
Social Sciences	Anthropology and Cultural Studies	Alfredo Barrera Vásquez	National Autonomous University of Mexico	Translation of the Chilam Balam and Maya linguistics	Also won in 1934	
Social Sciences	Economics	Henry Schultz	University of Chicago	Mathematical and statistical economics in Europe		

== 1933 Latin American and Caribbean Fellows ==
Category	Field of Study	Fellow	Institutional association	Research topic	Notes	Ref
Creative Art	Music Composition	Juan José Castro	Teatro Colón and Buenos Aires Philharmonic	Composing		
Humanities	Economic History	Eugenio Pereira Salas	Children's Lyceum N°1, Santiago	History of commercial relations between the United States and Spanish America, especially Chile		
Humanities	Iberian and Latin American History	Herminio Portell Vilá	University of Havana	Historical relationship between Cuba and the United States, with particular attention to the question of annexation	Also won in 1931 and 1932	
Natural Sciences	Engineering	David Segura y Gama	National Autonomous University of Mexico	Organization and functioning of metallurgical laboratories with special reference to the treatment of precious metals		
Natural Sciences	Medicine and Health	José Matias Cid	Hospital Psiquiátrico Agudo Avila Rosario	Pathology of the central nervous system		
Natural Sciences	Medicine and Health	Juan Farill y Solares	Department of Public Health, Mexico	Clinical theory and orthopedics with special reference to the nonsurgical treatment of deformities in children	Also won in 1932	
Natural Sciences	Organismic Biology and Ecology	Enrique Beltrán	National Autonomous University of Mexico	Marine biology and protozoology	Also won in 1932	
Natural Sciences	Plant Sciences	José A. Nolla	University of Puerto Rico	Inheritance of disease resistance in tobacco	Also won in 1932	

== See also ==
- Guggenheim Fellowship
- List of Guggenheim Fellowships awarded in 1932
- List of Guggenheim Fellowships awarded in 1934
