= List of Guggenheim Fellowships awarded in 1931 =

Seventy-seven artists and scholars, including 13 women, received fellowships, which added up to $4,500,000 in $2,500 increments. Cuban fellows were elected for the first time.

== 1931 U.S. and Canadian Fellows ==
Category	Field of Study	Fellow	Institutional association	Research topic	Notes	Ref
Creative Art	Drama and Performance Arts	Emjo Basshe		German and Russian theaters		
Creative Art	Drama and Performance Arts	Kate Clugston		Creative writing		
Creative Art	Fiction	Walter Stanley Campbell	University of Oklahoma	Biography of Sitting Bull	Pseudonym: Stanley Vestal. Also won in 1930.	
Creative Art	Fiction	Maurice Hindus		Writing		
Creative Art	Fiction	Katherine Anne Porter		Flowering Judas and Other Stories (published 1935)	Also won in 1938	
Creative Art	Fine Arts	Emil Bisttram		Mural painting		
Creative Art	Fine Arts	Alexander Brook		Painting		
Creative Art	Fine Arts	Harold Cash		Sculpture	Also won in 1930	
Creative Art	Fine Arts	Harry Gottlieb		Painting		
Creative Art	Fine Arts	Marsden Hartley		Painting		
Creative Art	Fine Arts	Oronzio Maldarelli		Sculpture	Also won in 1943	
Creative Art	Fine Arts	Reuben Nakian		Sculpture		
Creative Art	Fine Arts	Joseph Pollet		Painting		
Creative Art	Fine Arts	Ione Robinson		Painting		
Creative Art	Fine Arts	Doris Rosenthal	Columbia Teachers College	Painting	Also won in 1936	
Creative Art	Fine Arts	Alexander Raoul Stavenitz		Etching		
Creative Art	Music Composition	Otto Luening		Composing	Also won in 1930 and 1974	
Creative Art	Poetry	Hart Crane		Writing		
Creative Art	Poetry	John Crowe Ransom	Vanderbilt University	Writing		
Creative Art	Poetry	Genevieve Taggard	Mt. Holyoke College	Writing		
Humanities	American Literature	Harry Hayden Clark	University of Wisconsin	Industrial Revolution in the Yorkshire woolen and worsted industries		
Humanities	Architecture, Planning, & Design	Cecil Clair Briggs		Architectural restoration of the Acropolis of Athens		
Humanities	Biography	Carleton Beals		Porfirio Diaz		
Humanities	Economic History	Herbert Heaton	University of Minnesota	Volume 2: History of the woolen industry in England		
Humanities	Economic History	John Ewing Orchard	Columbia University	Transition occurring in China from agriculture and household industries to modern manufacturing		
Humanities	Economic History	George Ward Stocking	University of Texas	Mexican oil industry, the social control set up by the state, economic consequences of this program, and the future of the industry		
Humanities	English Literature	Thomas Whitfield Baldwin	University of Illinois			
Humanities	English Literature	George Bruner Parks	Washington University in St. Louis	Influence of English voyages from 1600 to 1660 on science and imaginative literature		
Humanities	English Literature	George William Williamson	University of Oregon	Metaphysical element in English literature of the first half of the 17th century		
Humanities	Fine Arts Research	Anita Brenner		Pre-Spanish art in the southern countries of the North American continent	Also won in 1930	
Humanities	Fine Arts Research	Francis Henry Taylor	Pennsylvania Museum of Art	Romanesque sculpture of the Roussillon, with special reference to the sculpture from Saint-Génis-des-Fontaines and the origins of the style of the 11th century		
Humanities	Fine Arts Research	Ernest Theodore DeWald	Princeton University	Stuttgart Psalter	Also won in 1927	
Humanities	French Literature	Salomon Alhadef Rhodes	City College of New York	French romantic poetry		
Humanities	Iberian and Latin American History	Lesley Byrd Simpson	University of California	Geoffrey of Monmouth's The History of the Kings of Britain	Also won in 1939	
Humanities	Literary Criticism	John Van Horne	University of Illinois	Bernardo de Balbuena	Also won in 1929	
Humanities	Medieval Literature	Erika von Erhardt-Siebold	Mt. Holyoke College	Edition of the Latin Anglo-Saxon riddles		
Humanities	Medieval Literature	Jacob Hammer	Hunter College	Geoffrey of Monmouth's The History of the Kings of Britain	Also won in 1929 and 1938	
Humanities	Medieval Literature	Leslie W. Jones	City College of New York	Script of Tours	Also won in 1929	
Humanities	Medieval Literature	Clark Harris Slover	University of Texas	Channels which were available for the transmission of literature and tradition from Ireland to Great Britain before the Arthurian Romances	Also won in 1925	
Humanities	Music Research	Henry Dixon Cowell	New Music Quarterly	Materials used in extra-European musical systems		
Humanities	Music Research	Roy Dickinson Welch	Smith College	History of music	Also won in 1930	
Humanities	Philosophy	Helen Huss Parkhurst	Barnard College	Architecture of Continental cathedrals and Oriental mosques		
Humanities	Religion	Harvie Branscomb	Duke University	Comparative study of Jewish and Christian ethics in the 1st and 2nd centuries		
Humanities	Russian History	William Henry Chamberlin	Christian Science Monitor	History of the Russian Revolution from the downfall of Tsarism to the adoption of the New Economic Policy	Also won in 1934	
Humanities	United States History	Reginald C. McGrane	University of Cincinnati	British investment in the United States, 1830-1860	Also won in 1930	
Natural Science	Applied Mathematics	Gustav C. Dahl	Massachusetts Institute of Technology	European practices in electric power transmission		
Natural Science	Applied Mathematics	Lydik S. Jacobsen	Stanford University	Earthquake-resistant flexible building materials		
Natural Science	Chemistry	Ermon Dwight Eastman	University of California	Structure and properties of atomic nuclei		
Natural Science	Chemistry	George Sutton Parks	Stanford University	Thermal chemistry of organic compounds		
Natural Science	Chemistry	Thomas Erwin Phipps, Sr.	University of Illinois		Also won in 1930	
Natural Science	Chemistry	George Scatchard	Massachusetts Institute of Technology	Theories of liquid solution		
Natural Science	Earth Science	Walter Scott Adkins	University of Texas			
Natural Science	Geography and Environmental Studies	Carl O. Sauer	University of California	Effects of Spanish colonization on native Indian land systems and population groupings		
Natural Science	Medicine and Health	Edward Lee Howes	Yale University		Also won in 1930	
Natural Science	Molecular and Cellular Biology	Arthur H. Steinhaus	Central YMCA College	Physiology of exercise		
Natural Science	Organismic Biology and Ecology	Hilario Atanacio Roxas	University of the Philippines			
Natural Science	Organismic Biology and Ecology	Samuel Brody	University of Missouri	Chemistry of growth in certain domestic animals	Also won in 1929	
Natural Science	Organismic Biology and Ecology	Mary Stuart MacDougall	Agnes Scott College	Effects of ultraviolet radiation upon protozoa		
Natural Science	Organismic Biology and Ecology	Horace Wesley Stunkard	New York University	Life history of certain parasitic worms		
Natural Science	Physics	Jerome Boley Green	Ohio State University	Effect of magnetic fields on the emission of spectrum lines		
Natural Science	Physics	Jens Rud Nielsen	California Institute of Technology	Raman spectra and molecular structure		
Natural Science	Physics	Henry DeWolf Smyth	Princeton University			
Social Sciences	Anthropology and Cultural Studies	Ruth L. Bunzel	Columbia University	Indian backgrounds of the Mexican Nation	Also won in 1930	
Social Sciences	Anthropology and Cultural Studies	Lila Morris O'Neale	University of California	Inca and pre-Inca textile collections in Peru		
Social Sciences	Economics	Dorothy Johnson Orchard		Social movements accompanying the industrialization of China, including an analysis of the labor supply of China, the labor movement, and use of boycotting as an economic and political weapon		
Social Sciences	Education	William Edward Zeuch	Commonwealth College	Workers' education projects of Western Europe		
Social Sciences	Sociology	Joseph Fulling Fishman	New York City Department of Correction	Conditions in jails in the United States		

== 1931 Latin American and Caribbean Fellows ==
Category	Field of Study	Fellow	Institutional association	Research topic	Notes	Ref
Humanities	Economic History	Jorge Roa y Reyes	University of Havana	Economic relationship between the United States and the Latin American Republics		
Humanities	Iberian and Latin American History	Vera Lee Brown	Smith College	Relations of England and Spain as colonial powers in the 18th century		
Humanities	Iberian and Latin American History	Herminio Portell Vilá	University of Havana	Historical relationship between Cuba and the United States, with particular attention to the question of annexation	Also won in 1932 and 1933	
Humanities	Music Research	Augusto Novaro		Musical theory		
Humanities	Philosophy	Homero Mario Guglielmini	National University of the Littoral	Principal currents of philosophy in the United States		
Natural Science	Earth Science	Tomás Barrera y Arenas	National University of Mexico	Metallurgy, with special reference to non-metallic metals and the methods and technique of geophysical exploration		
Natural Science	Mathematics	Genaro Moreno García-Conde	Academia de Guerra School of Military Engineering	Mathematical research, especially in the theory of functions of real variables		
Natural Science	Medicine and Health	Eduardo Bunster Montero	University of Chile	Physiology of the ovary and of certain glands of internal secretion		
Natural Science	Medicine and Health	Guillermo Montaño Islas	Ministry of Education (Mexico)	Rural sociology and economics; rural hygiene and public health		
Natural Science	Molecular and Cellular Biology	Salomón Horovitz	University of Buenos Aires	Cytology and genetics		
Natural Science	Organismic Biology and Ecology	Carlos Guillermo Aguayo y Castro	University of Havana	Taxonomic studies in the fields of malacology and entomology		
Natural Science	Plant Sciences	Manuel Elgueta Guérin	Sociedad Nacional de Agricultura	Application of genetics to the improvement of plants	Also won in 1932	
Social Science	Economics	Carlos García Mata	Department of Finance and Public Works, Province of Santa Fe	Methods of predicting economic phenomena		

== See also ==
- Guggenheim Fellowship
- List of Guggenheim Fellowships awarded in 1930
- List of Guggenheim Fellowships awarded in 1932
