= Objectivity (science) =

Type of attempt to uncover truths

In science, objectivity refers to attempts to do higher quality research by eliminating personal biases (or prejudices), irrational emotions and false beliefs, while focusing mainly on proven facts and evidence. It is often linked to observation as part of the scientific method. It is thus related to the aim of testability and reproducibility. To be considered objective, the results of measurement must be communicated from person to person, and then demonstrated for third parties, as an advance in a collective understanding of the world. Such demonstrable knowledge has ordinarily conferred demonstrable powers of prediction or technology.

The problem of philosophical objectivity is contrasted with personal subjectivity, sometimes exacerbated by the overgeneralization of a hypothesis to the whole. For example, Newton's law of universal gravitation appears to be the norm for the attraction between celestial bodies, but it was later refined and extended—and philosophically superseded—by the more general theory of relativity.

== History ==
The scientific method was argued for by Enlightenment philosopher Francis Bacon, rose to popularity with the discoveries of Isaac Newton and his followers, and continued into later eras. In the early eighteenth century, there existed an epistemic virtue in science which has been called truth-to-nature. This ideal was practiced by Enlightenment naturalists and scientific atlas-makers, and involved active attempts to eliminate any idiosyncrasies in their representations of nature in order to create images thought best to represent "what truly is". Judgment and skill were deemed necessary in order to determine the "typical", "characteristic", "ideal", or "average". In practicing, truth-to-nature naturalists did not seek to depict exactly what was seen; rather, they sought a reasoned image.

In the latter half of the nineteenth-century, objectivity in science was born when a new practice of mechanical objectivity appeared. "'Let nature speak for itself' became the watchword of a new brand of scientific objectivity." It was at this time that idealized representations of nature, which were previously seen as a virtue, were now seen as a vice. Scientists began to see it as their duty to actively restrain themselves from imposing their own projections onto nature. The aim was to liberate representations of nature from subjective, human interference and in order to achieve this scientists began using self-registering instruments, cameras, wax molds, and other technological devices.

In the twentieth century trained judgment supplemented mechanical objectivity as scientists began to recognize that, in order for images or data to be of any use, scientists needed to be able to see scientifically; that is, to interpret images or data and identify and group them according to particular professional training, rather than to simply depict them mechanically. Since the latter half of the nineteenth century, objectivity has come to involve a combination of trained judgment and mechanical objectivity.

== Objectivity in measurement ==
Another methodological aspect is the avoidance of bias, which can involve cognitive bias, cultural bias, or sampling bias. Methods for avoiding or overcoming such biases include random sampling and double-blind trials. However, objectivity in measurement can be unobtainable in certain circumstances. Even the most quantitative social sciences such as economics employ measures that are constructs (conventions, to employ the term coined by Pierre Duhem).

=== Semi-objectivity ===
Some philosophers and theorists describe a middle ground between complete objectivity and complete subjectivity, which may be referred to as semi-objectivity. In this view, a claim or judgement is considered semi-objective if it is largely based on facts, logic, or standardised methods, but still retains elements of personal interpretation or value influence. Semi-objectivity thus describes knowledge that is neither wholly detached from human perspectives nor entirely reducible to individual feelings.

Related ideas can be found in the philosophy of science literature. For example, Helen Longino’s account of contextual empiricism emphasises that objectivity emerges through critical interaction and inter-subjective evaluation within scientific communities. Donna Haraway has likewise argued for "situated knowledge," where scientific accounts are recognised as being produced from particular perspectives rather than a "view from nowhere". In statistics, Andrew Gelman and Christian Hennig have proposed re-conceiving objectivity as a set of attributes such as transparency, consensus, and impartiality, rather than a binary opposition between subjective and objective.

The concept of semi-objectivity highlights attempts to recognise the interplay between empirical grounding and interpretive elements in scientific practice.

== The role of the scientific community ==
Various scientific processes, such as peer reviews, the discussions at scientific conferences, and other meetings where scientific results are presented, are part of a social process whose purpose is to strengthen the objective aspect of the scientific method.

Next to unintentional and systematic error, there is always the possibility of deliberate misrepresentation of scientific results, whether for gain, fame, or ideological motives. When such cases of scientific fraud come to light, they usually give rise to an academic scandal, but it is unknown how much fraud goes undiscovered. For important results, other groups will try to repeat the experiment. If they consistently fail, they will bring these negative results into the scientific debate.

== Critiques of scientific objectivity ==
A critical argument on scientific objectivity and positivism is that all science has a degree of interpretivism. In the 1920s, Percy Bridgman's The Logic of Modern Physics and the operationalism presented was centered in such recognition.

=== Thomas Kuhn's The Structure of Scientific Revolutions ===
Based on a historical review of the development of certain scientific theories in his book, The Structure of Scientific Revolutions, scientist and historian Thomas Kuhn raised some philosophical objections to claims of the possibility of scientific understanding being truly objective. In Kuhn's analysis, scientists in different disciplines organise themselves into de facto paradigms within which scientific research is done, junior scientists are educated, and scientific problems are determined.

When observational data arises which appears to contradict or falsify a given scientific paradigm, scientists within that paradigm historically have not immediately rejected it, as Karl Popper's philosophical theory of falsificationism would have them do. Instead they have gone to considerable lengths to resolve the apparent conflict without rejecting the paradigm. Through ad hoc variations to the theory and sympathetic interpretation of the data, supporting scientists will resolve the apparent conundrum. In extreme cases, they may ignore the data altogether. Thus, the failure of a scientific paradigm will go into crisis when a significant portion of scientists working in the field lose confidence in it. The corollary of this observation is that a paradigm is contingent on the social order amongst scientists at the time it gains ascendancy.

Kuhn's theory has been criticised by scientists such as Richard Dawkins and Alan Sokal as presenting a relativist view of scientific progress.

=== Donna Haraway's Situated Knowledges ===
In Situated Knowledges: The Science Question in Feminism and the Privilege of Partial Perspective (1988), Donna Haraway argues that objectivity in science and philosophy is traditionally understood as a kind of disembodied and transcendent "conquering gaze from nowhere." She argues that this kind of objectivity, in which the subject is split apart and distanced from the object, is an impossible "illusion, a god trick." She demands a re-thinking of objectivity in such a way that, while still striving for "faithful accounts of the real world," we must also acknowledge our perspective within the world. She calls this new kind of knowledge-making "situated knowledges." Objectivity, she argues, "turns out to be about particular and specific embodiment and ... not about the false vision promising transcendence of all limits and responsibility". This new objectivity, "allows us to become answerable for what we learn how to see."

== See also ==
- Objectivity (philosophy)
