= Barbara H. Stein =

American bibliographer

Barbara H. Stein

Barbara H. Stein (1916 – 9 December 2005 Princeton, N.J.) was a scholar and bibliographer of Latin American and Iberia at the Princeton University Library. She and her husband Stanley J. Stein published works on Spain and Spanish America, analyzing the rise and fall of the Spanish Empire. Stein was honored with the American Historical Association’s Award for Scholarly Distinction in 1996, recognizing her career contributions to Iberian and Spanish American history. In 2018, Princeton University acquired a valuable collection of Brazilian manuscripts. "The acquisition honors Stanley and Barbara Stein's contributions to the library's Latin American collections and to Latin American studies at Princeton."

== Early life and career ==
Born Barbara Hadley to a New England family that traces its roots back to the seventeenth century, she attended pre-college schools that shaped her wide perspective on the world. Two schools were in Europe, the International School in Switzerland and the Odenvald School in Germany, and she returned to the U.S. attending Concord Academy in Massachusetts, and the Quaker's George School in Pennsylvania. She entered Smith College and studied with Vera Brown Holmes, a scholar of Latin America and Iberian who had been awarded a Guggenheim Fellowship in 1931. Stein graduated magna cum laude from Smith, and entered graduate school at University of California, Berkeley, where she earned an M.A. thesis on APRA, Peru's oldest political party. She embarked on doctoral study on the abolition of slavery in Brazil, with a U.S. State Department Cordell Hull fellowship to support her research. She conducted research on the social and political aspects of abolitionism, pursuing archival work in Fortaleza, Recife, Salvador de Bahia, Rio de Janeiro, and São Paulo. While in Brazil, she met anthropologist Melville Herskovits and his wife Frances. She also met Stanley Stein, a graduate student at Harvard in Latin American history, whom she married in 1943. Stein and Stein collected Afro-Brazilian songs, called jongos, which have recently received scholarly attention.

She had a variety of life experiences that shaped her scholarly interest on power relations included teaching school in rural Michoacan, Mexico, working in a California cannery, working as a census taker in California for the 1940 census, and as a labor economist in the U.S. Department of Labor and Nelson Rockefeller’s Office of Coordinator of Inter-American Affairs, in Washington, D.C.

Following her marriage to Stanley Stein, the couple moved to Princeton, N.J., where she became the first Latin American bibliographer at the Princeton University Library, and continued to do research and writing on Latin America and Iberia. Starting in 1970, she and her husband published a series of works on the Spain and its relationship with its overseas possessions within the context of the Atlantic world. The first jointly published work, The Colonial Heritage of Latin America (1970) has made an enduring impact on the field. Historian Vincent Peloso says of this work, "It is fair to say that no one who studied Latin American history over the last 35 years would have failed to engage the slim, elegantly written synthesis." Following this work, the couple's research resulted in three major academic publications: Silver, trade, and war: Spain and America in the Making of Early Modern Europe. Johns Hopkins University Press (2000); Apogee of Empire: Spain and New Spain in the Age of Charles III, 1759–1789. Johns Hopkins University Press 2003 and Edge of Crisis: War and Trade in the Spanish Atlantic, 1789–1808. Johns Hopkins Press 2009. The final volume reverses the previous order of the authors' names, placing hers first. Barbara Stein was recognized as a full partner in the intellectual enterprise of decades, in an era when many wives of male academics were silent intellectual partners. The Steins' significant works garnered them both the American Historical Association's highest award for senior scholars.

== Honors ==
- 1996 American Historical Association, Distinguished Scholar Award.

== Works ==
- 1977. Latin America: A Guide to the Sources in the Princeton University Library.
- 1970. The colonial heritage of Latin America. With Stanley J. Stein. Vol. 10. New York: Oxford University Press.ISBN 978-0195012927
- 1970. La herencia colonial de América Latina/Colonial heritage of Latin America. Siglo xxi, 1970.ISBN 978-9682301575
- 2000. Silver, trade, and war: Spain and America in the making of early modern Europe. With Stanley J. Stein. Johns Hopkins University Press.ISBN 978-0801877551
- 2003. Apogee of empire: Spain and New Spain in the age of Charles III, 1759–1789. With Stanley J. Stein. Johns Hopkins University Press. ISBN 978-0801873393
- 2009. Edge of crisis: War and trade in the Spanish Atlantic, 1789–1808. Johns Hopkins University Press, 2009. With Stanley J. Stein ISBN 978-1421414249
