= Event (relativity) =

Situation or occurrence located at a specific point in space and time

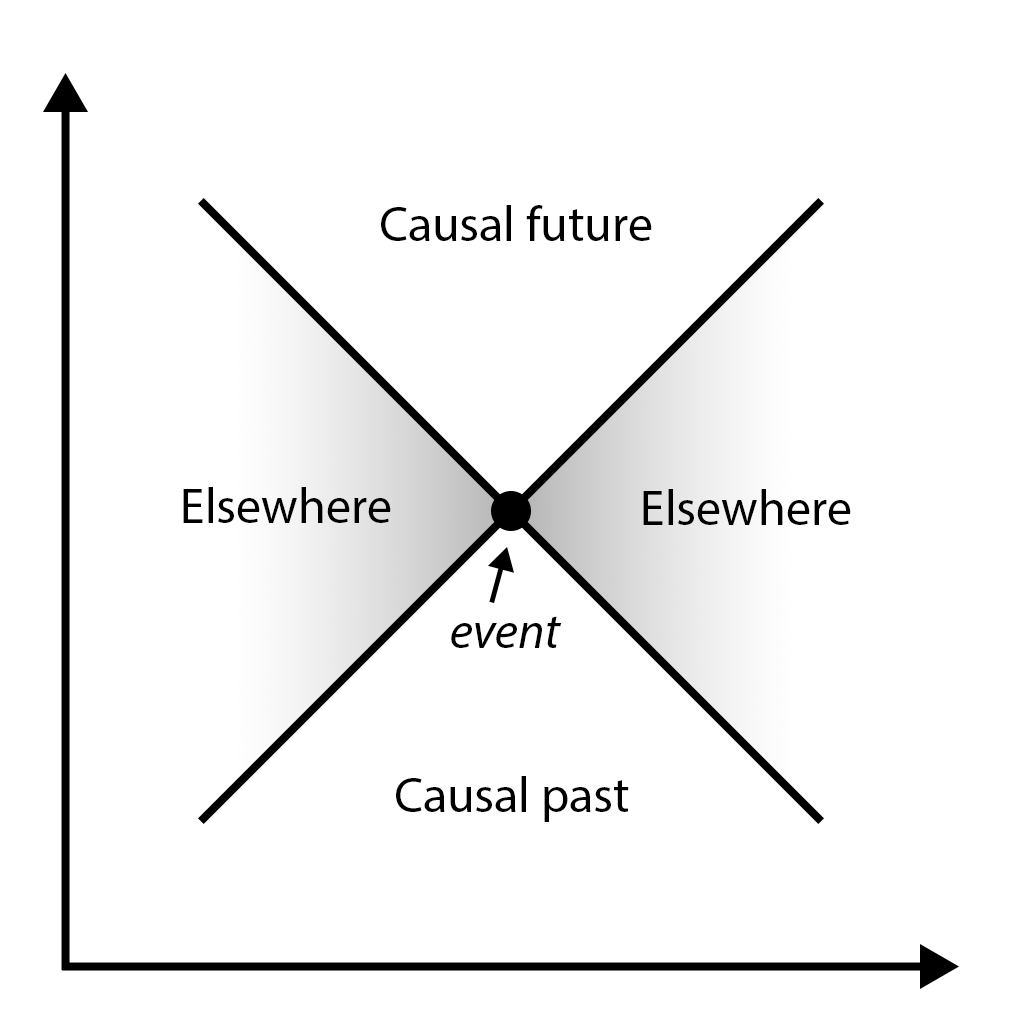
An event in spacetime and a 2D slice of its causal cone.

In relativity, an event is anything that happens that has a specific time and place in spacetime. For example, a glass breaking on the floor is an event; it occurs at a unique place and a unique time. Strictly speaking, the notion of an event is an idealization, in the sense that it specifies a definite time and place, whereas any actual event is bound to have a finite extent, both in time and in space.

The spacetime interval between two events: $(\text{interval})^2 = \left[ \frac{\text{event time}}{\text{separation}} \right]^2 - \left[ \frac{\text{event space}}{\text{separation}} \right]^2$

is an invariant.

An event in the universe is caused by the set of events in its causal past. An event contributes to the occurrence of events in its causal future.

Upon choosing a frame of reference, one can assign coordinates to the event: three spatial coordinates $\vec{x} = (x,y,z)$ to describe the location and one time coordinate $t$ to specify the moment at which the event occurs. These four coordinates $(\vec{x},t)$ together form a four-vector associated to the event.

One of the goals of relativity is to specify the possibility of one event influencing another. This is done by means of the metric tensor, which allows for determining the causal structure of spacetime. The difference (or interval) between two events can be classified into spacelike, lightlike and timelike separations. Only if two events are separated by a lightlike or timelike interval can one influence the other.

P. W. Bridgman found the event concept insufficient for operational physics in his book The Logic of Modern Physics.

== See also ==
- Relativity of simultaneity
