= List of Guggenheim Fellowships awarded in 1930 =

Eighty-five Guggenheim Fellowships were awarded in 1930, amounting to $200,000. The Latin-American Exchange Fellowships were introduced this year and brought two fellows to the United States to study. American recipients represented 23 states and 34 institutions. New York University had the most faculty recipients (5), followed by University of California (4). Nella Larsen was the first Black woman to receive a Guggenheim.

== 1930 U.S. and Canadian Fellows ==
Category	Field of Study	Fellow	Institutional association	Research topic	Notes	Ref
Creative Arts	Drama and Performance Art	Ellsworth Prouty Conkle	University of Delaware	Writing		
Creative Arts	Fiction	Walter Stanley Campbell	University of Oklahoma	Biography of Sitting Bull	Also won in 1931	
Creative Arts	Fiction	Jonathan Worth Daniels		Writing		
Creative Arts	Fiction	Helen Rose Hull	Columbia University	Writing		
Creative Arts	Fiction	Nella Larsen Imes		Writing		
Creative Arts	Fiction	Jacques G. Le Clercq	Columbia University	Writing		
Creative Arts	Fiction	Thomas Clayton Wolfe	Washington Square College	Writing		
Creative Arts	Fine Arts	Pamela Bianco		Painting		
Creative Arts	Fine Arts	Harold Cash		Sculpture	Also won in 1931	
Creative Arts	Fine Arts	Mordi Gassner		Mural painting	Also won in 1929	
Creative Arts	Fine Arts	Thomas Handforth		Etching		
Creative Arts	Fine Arts	Arthur Lee	Art Students League of New York	Classic European sculpture		
Creative Arts	Fine Arts	Monty Lewis		Painting		
Creative Arts	Fine Arts	Sidney Loeb		Sculpture	Also won in 1929	
Creative Arts	Fine Arts	E. Bruce Moore	University of Wichita	Sculpture	Also won in 1929	
Creative Arts	Fine Arts	Archibald John Motley, Jr.		Painting	Also won in 1929	
Creative Arts	Fine Arts	Francis R. White		Gothic glassmaking		
Creative Arts	Music Composition	Carl Bricken		Composing		
Creative Arts	Music Composition	Ruth Porter Crawford		Composing		
Creative Arts	Music Composition	Robert M. Delaney		Composing	Also won in 1929	
Creative Arts	Music Composition	Otto Luening		Composing	Also won in 1931 and 1974	
Creative Arts	Music Composition	Quincy Porter		Composing	Also won in 1929	
Creative Arts	Music Composition	Randall Thompson	Wellesley College	Composing	Also won in 1929	
Creative Arts	Music Composition	Mark Wessel		Composing	Also won in 1932	
Creative Arts	Poetry	Edward Davison		Preparation for an epic poem		
Creative Arts	Poetry	H. Phelps Putnam		Writing		
Humanities	Architecture, Planning and Design	Kenneth John Conant	Harvard University	Restoration drawings of Cluny Abbey, the Basilica of Saint Martin, Tours, and the Abbey of Saint Martial, Limoges, all Romanesque French churches	Also won in 1926, 1928, 1929, and 1954	
Humanities	Bibliography	Mary McRae McLucas	John Day Company	Methods past and present of producing printing in the outstanding presses of Central Europe and Great Britain; study of hand-printing and photographic composition; bibliography of books about books		
Humanities	British History	Viola Florence Barnes	Mt. Holyoke College	England's colonial policy, particularly in relation to Massachusetts		
Humanities	British History	Charles Harris Wesley	Howard University	Negro slavery apprenticeship in the British West Indies between 1807 and 1838		
Humanities	Classics	Ben Edwin Perry	University of Illinois	Life of Aesop	Also won in 1954	
Humanities	East Asian Studies	Owen Lattimore		Present conditions in Manchuria and Chinese Turkistan and their historical and geographical background	Also won in 1932	
Humanities	Economics History	Paul Schuster Taylor	University of California	Socio-economic aspects of the emigration of Mexicans to the United States		
Humanities	English Literature	Ford Keeler Brown	St. John's College, Annapolis	Social aspects and influence of the English Evangelicals, 1798-1830	Also won in 1927 and 1929	
Humanities	English Literature	Neilson Campbell Hannay	Boston University	Biography of William Cowper and known letters		
Humanities	English Literature	John Leslie Hotson	New York University	Systematic searches for new material for writing the lives of Elizabethan poets and dramatists	Also won in 1929	
Humanities	English Literature	Henry Donaldson Jordan	Dartmouth College	English newspaper press, 1853-1865		
Humanities	English Literature	Eleanore Boswell	University of London	History of Restoration theatre		
Humanities	English Literature	Helen Constance White	University of Wisconsin, Madison	Mystical elements in the religious poetry of 17th-century England	Also won in 1929	
Humanities	Fine Arts Research	Anita Brenner	Columbia University	Pre-Spanish America art in the southern countries of the North American continent, with special attention to Aztec art	Also won in 1931	
Humanities	Fine Arts Research	Thomas Temple Hoopes	New York University	History of firearms from their invention to the introduction of automatic manufacturing machinery		
Humanities	Fine Arts Research	Clarence Kennedy	Smith College	Study of Desiderio da Settignano		
Humanities	Fine Arts Research	Ruth Wedgwood Kennedy		Monograph on Alesso Baldovinetti		
Humanities	French Literature	Henri Maurice Peyre	Yale University	Louis Ménard		
Humanities	German and Eastern European History	Brynjolf Jakob Hovde	University of Pittsburgh	Social and economic conditions in Scandinavia, especially in the 19th and 20th centuries		
Humanities	Iberian and Latin American History	John Tate Lanning	Duke University	Universities of the Hispanic colonies of the New World		
Humanities	Literary Criticism	Mary M. Colum		Contemporary American and French ideas of criticism	Also won in 1938	
Humanities	Literary Criticism	Joseph Wood Krutch	The Nation	Aesthetics		
Humanities	Medieval Literature	Blanche Beatrice Boyer	Mt. Holyoke College	Latin manuscripts written in minuscule of the Irish and Anglo-Saxon script	Also won in 1929	
Humanities	Medieval Literature	Sister Mary Aquinas Devlin	Rosary College	Thomas Brunton's life, sermons, and influence		
Humanities	Medieval Literature	Richard Ager Newhall	Williams College	Military and financial phases of the latter part of the Hundred Years' War		
Humanities	Medieval Literature	Josiah Cox Russell	New Mexico Normal University	Biographical data of the manuscripts of certain Latin authors and 13th-century England		
Humanities	Medieval Literature	John Webster Spargo	Northwestern University	Medieval legends about Virgil	Also won in 1936	
Humanities	Medieval History	Eugene Hugh Byrne	University of Wisconsin	Commercial custom and practice in the Middle Ages		
Humanities	Music Research	Roy Dickinson Welch	Smith College	Relation of musical art to general culture and social history	Also won in 1931	
Humanities	Philosophy	A. Cornelius Benjamin	University of Illinois	Logic and scientific methodology in England and France; preparation for a systematic treatise on The Logic of Science		
Humanities	Philosophy	John Daniel Wild	Harvard University	Philosophical works of George Berkeley	Also won in 1956	
Humanities	Religion	Silva Tipple New		Textual criticism of the New Testament and the discrimination of the textual families in Greek, Syriac and Armenian manuscripts of the New Testament	Also won in 1929	
Humanities	Spanish and Portuguese Literature	Hyman Chonon Berkowitz	University of Wisconsin	Benito Pérez Galdós and his contribution to Spanish life and letters		
Humanities	Spanish and Portuguese Literature	Frederick Courtney Tarr	Princeton University	Origin and development of the Articulos de costumbre	Also won in 1929	
Humanities	United States History	Reginald C. McGrane	University of Cincinnati	British investment in the United States, 1830-1860	Also won in 1931	
Natural Sciences	Chemistry	Thomas Erwin Phipps, Sr.	University of Illinois	Problems in the field of molecular rays	Also won in 1931	
Natural Sciences	Chemistry	Evald Laurids Skau	Trinity College	Purification of organic compounds		
Natural Sciences	Earth Science	Ernest Raymond Lilley	New York University	Political and commercial policies regarding the development of mineral resources in the light of present knowledge of the character and extent of such resources		
Natural Sciences	Mathematics	Harry Shultz Vandiver	University of Texas, Austin	Theory of algebraic numbers	Also won in 1927	
Natural Sciences	Medicine and Health	Edward Lee Howes	Yale University	Problems of wound healing	Also won in 1931	
Natural Sciences	Medicine and Health	Eric Oldberg	Peter Bent Brigham Hospital			
Natural Sciences	Molecular and Cellular Biology	Theodore L. Althausen	University of California Medical School	Certain physiological disturbances and functional regeneration of the liver under various conditions of experimental and spontaneous injury		
Natural Sciences	Molecular and Cellular Biology	Simon Freed	University of California	Magnetic and spectroscopic properties of atoms and molecules in the crystalline state		
Natural Sciences	Molecular and Cellular Biology	Arthur Grollman	Johns Hopkins University	Physical chemistry		
Natural Sciences	Organismic Biology and Ecology	Eugene M. Landis	Hospital of the University of Pennsylvania	Reactions affecting the minute blood vessels of mammals	Also won in 1929	
Natural Sciences	Organismic Biology and Ecology	Clarence Eugene Mickel	University of Minnesota	Life and habits of parasitical wasps		
Natural Sciences	Organismic Biology and Ecology	Homer William Smith	University of Virginia	Physiological study of certain rare species of lung fishes which live in the waters of the Nile River and the Mediterranean Sea	Also won in 1928	
Natural Sciences	Plant Science	Carroll William Dodge	Harvard University	Completion of lichen flora in Costa Rica	Also won in 1929	
Natural Sciences	Plant Science	Thomas H. Goodspeed	University of California	Monographic treatment of the genus Nicotiana	Also won in 1935 and 1956	
Social Sciences	Anthropology and Cultural Studies	Ruth L. Bunzel	Barnard College	Indian backgrounds of the Mexican nation	Also won in 1931	
Social Sciences	Economics	Paul Howard Douglas	University of Chicago	Movement of real wages in Europe, 1900-1930		
Social Sciences	Economics	Mordecai Ezekiel	Bureau of Agricultural Economics	Methods used by governmental agencies in leading European countries in regulating, directing and controlling economic activities		
Social Sciences	Economics	Frank Hyneman Knight	University of Chicago	Movements in economic and social thought in relation to the British classical economics and the current development of institutional and statistical economics in America		
Social Sciences	Economics	Katharine Snodgrass	Stanford University	Economics of food substitution, specifically the displacement of dairy fats by vegetable fats in Northern Europe		
Social Sciences	Psychology	John Paul Nafe	Clark University	Validity of the "quantitative" theory of sensory feelings		
Social Sciences	Psychology	Carroll C. Pratt	Harvard University	Expressive properties of musical structure by means of methods being developed by the Gestalt psychologists		
Social Sciences	Political Science	Nicholas John Spykman	Yale University	Asiatic nationalism viewed as a political expression of the cultural transformation due to the penetration of Euro-American culture into areas of different cultures		

== 1930 Latin-American Exchange Fellows ==
Category	Field of Study	Fellow	Institutional association	Research topic	Notes	Ref
Natural Sciences	Mathematics	Alfonso Nápoles Gándara	Escuela Nacional Preparatoria	Differential geometry and harmonic analysis		
Natural Sciences	Medicine and Health	Arturo Rosenblueth Stearns	National University of Mexico	Physiology and biochemistry		

== See also ==
- Guggenheim Fellowship
- List of Guggenheim Fellowships awarded in 1929
- List of Guggenheim Fellowships awarded in 1931
