= Knollenberg =

Knollenberg (German pronunciation: [ˈknɔlənˌbɛʁk]) is a German surname.

== Origin ==
The name may originate from Knollenberg, Württemberg, and can ultimately be derived from knolle (meaning bulb, tuber) and berg (meaning mountain, hill).

== Prevalence ==
The surname is not very common in modern Germany, where the highest level of prevalence is in Vechta. The surname is more common in the United States.

== Notable people ==
Notable people with this surname include:

- Friedrich Knollenberg (1878-1950), German politician (de)
- Joe Knollenberg (1933-2018), American politician
- Marty Knollenberg (born 1963), American politician
- Mary Knollenberg (1904-1992), American sculptor
