= Laszlo S. Toth =

Hungarian-French materials scientist

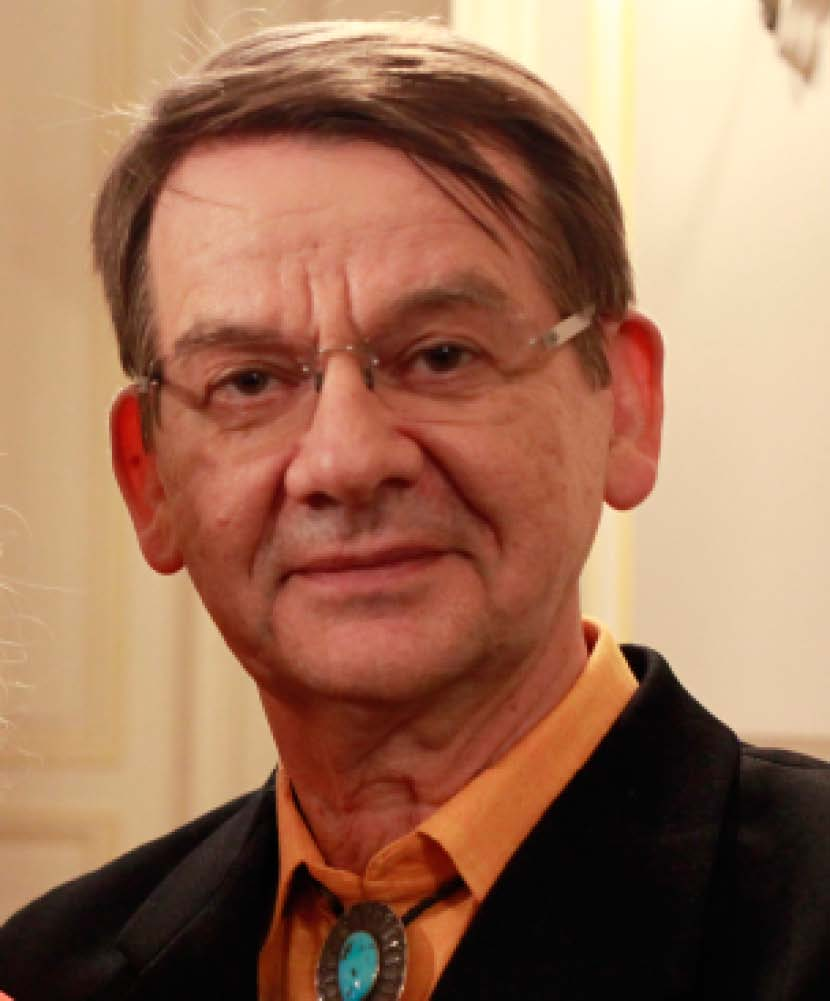
- Toth in 2026
- Occupations: Physicist, materials scientist, and academician

Academic background
- Education: M.S., Physics and Astronomy; Ph.D., Solid-State Physics
- Alma mater: Eötvös Loránd University

Academic work
- Institutions: University of Lorraine (France); University of Miskolc (Hungary)

Laszlo S. Toth is a physicist, materials scientist, and academician. He is a professor emeritus at the University of Lorraine, Doctor Honoris Causa and Professor Miskolcinensis at the University of Miskolc.

Toth's research interests are materials science, deformation mechanics, and microstructure modeling. He was made an external member of the Hungarian Academy of Sciences in 2025.

== Education ==
Toth completed his Master's degree in Physics and Astronomy at Eötvös Loránd University (ELTE) in 1976. Afterwards, he received his Ph.D. in Solid-State Physics in 1979, and the Candidate Degree at the Hungarian Academy of Sciences in 1986.

== Career ==
Toth began his academic career as a lecturer and researcher at ELTE in 1976. He subsequently worked at McGill University and the Catholic University of Louvain before joining the University of Metz (France) in 1992. He assumed the role of professor at Metz in 1998 and was appointed the first director of the Laboratory for the Study of Microstructures and Mechanics of Materials from 2010 to 2012. In 2012, he founded the Labex DAMAS research center, which he directed until 2021. He is a professor emeritus at the University of Lorraine in France. Additionally, he is professor "Miskolcinensis" at the University of Miskolc in Hungary, and an external member of the Hungarian Academy of Sciences.

== Research ==
Toth's research has focused on crystal plasticity, crystallographic textures in metals, mechanics of materials, and severe plastic deformation. He proposed a viscoplastic model that regularizes the Taylor ambiguity problem in crystal plasticity, a grain fragmentation model based on lattice curvature, and proposed a scalar interaction parameter by tuning the self-consistent predictions with the finite element results. He also explored elasto-visco-plastic behavior, and established a dislocation density-based general strain hardening model, presented a flow line function based deformation analysis, and introduced new approaches for strain hardening. Along with his colleagues, he was the first to propose high-pressure tube twisting and has conducted simulations which showed that the sliding of grain boundaries caused a randomization of nanocrystallines. He also employed a kinematic model equation for twinning behavior, which used crystal plasticity principles.

== Awards and honors ==
- 2012 – Grand Prize of Research, Society of East-Industry of France
- 2012 – Knight of Higher Education in France, University of Lorraine
- 2021 – Professor Miskolcinensis, University of Miskolc
- 2023 – Doctor Honoris Causa – University of Miskolc
- 2025 – External member, Hungarian Academy of Sciences

== Selected articles ==
- Toth, L.S; Gilormini, P; Jonas, J.J (1988). "Effect of rate sensitivity on the stability of torsion textures". Acta Metallurgica. 36 (12): 3077–3091. doi:10.1016/0001-6160(88)90045-4.
- Tóth, L. S.; Estrin, Y.; Lapovok, R.; Gu, C. (2010). "A model of grain fragmentation based on lattice curvature". Acta Materialia. 58 (5): 1782–1794. doi:10.1016/j.actamat.2009.11.020.
- Toth, L. S.; Gu, C. (2014). "Ultrafine-grain metals by severe plastic deformation". Materials Characterization. 92: 1–14. doi:10.1016/j.matchar.2014.02.003.
- Toth, L. S.; Gu, C. F.; Beausir, B.; Fundenberger, J. J.; Hoffman, M. (2016). "Geometrically necessary dislocations favor the Taylor uniform deformation mode in ultra-fine-grained polycrystals". Acta Materialia. 117: 35–42. doi:10.1016/j.actamat.2016.06.062.
