= Cuban nationality law =

Cuban Citizenship Act

Parliament of Cuba
- Long title: An Act relating to Cuban citizenship
- Territorial extent: Cuba
- Enacted by: Government of Cuba

Related legislation
- Constitution of Cuba
- Status: Current legislation

Cuban nationality law is regulated by the Constitution of Cuba, currently the 2019 Constitution, and to a limited degree upon Decree 358 of 1944. These laws determine who is, or is eligible to be, a citizen of Cuba. The legal means to acquire nationality and formal membership in a nation differ from the relationship of rights and obligations between a national and the nation, known as citizenship. Cuban nationality is typically obtained either on the principle of jus soli, i.e. by birth in Cuba; or under the rules of jus sanguinis, i.e. by birth abroad to a parent with Cuban nationality. It can also be granted to a permanent resident who has lived in the country for a given period of time through naturalization.

== Acquiring Cuban nationality ==
Cubans may acquire nationality through birth or naturalization. The current scheme was adopted in 1976, retained in the Constitutional revision of 1992 and 2002, and modified to incorporate dual nationality in 2019.

=== By birthright ===
Recognition of birthright nationality requires a passport issued by the country of birth with a visa to enter Cuba; an identity card or registration of the birth in the Civil Registry or Special Registry of Acts and Facts of Cubans Abroad, and a Cuban reference who makes a sworn statement to provide for the housing and maintenance of the applicant. Applications for those born abroad are submitted to the Directorate of Immigration and Foreigners. Under Article 34 of the 2019 Constitution, nationality by birthright is bestowed upon:

- Persons born in Cuba, excepting those children of foreigners who are in Cuba in service to their governments or an international organizations;
- Persons born outside of Cuba who are abroad in service to the Cuban government;
- Persons born abroad to Cuban parents; or
- Persons born abroad to parents who were born in Cuba but have lost Cuban nationality.

=== By naturalization ===
Naturalization under the 1944 Decree 358 requires establishing a continuous residence in the territory for a minimum of five years and knowledge of the Spanish language. Residency is reduced to two years for those married with Cuban nationals or who have children born in Cuba. They must comply with legal requirements to obtain a citizenship card and declare the intent to obtain Cuban nationality. Under Article 35 of the 2019 Constitution, foreigners who can be naturalized include:

- Foreigners who have complied with the naturalization law; or
- Persons who have been deprived of nationality in their country of origin. This type of naturalization is bestowed at the discretion of the President of Cuba.

== Loss of Cuban nationality ==
There is no regulation which outlines a process for loss or renunciation of nationality. According to Article 38 of the 2019 Constitution, Cubans may not be deprived of their citizenship, except under certain circumstances, which the legislators may describe. The article also states that nationality can be renounced by following legal processes. Article 37, provides "Neither marriage, civil union, nor legal separation will affect the [nationality] of spouses, partners, or children".

== Dual nationality ==
Under previous constitutions, multiple citizenship was not allowed, though the government recognized that persons could hold dual nationalities. The modifications in the 2019 Constitution provided for dual nationality in Article 36, which states that within the national territory, only Cuban law shall be applicable.

== History ==
Cuba's quest for independence began with the ideals in other Spanish American colonies in the 1810s. Initially, because of the dependence of the island upon Spain, loyalty to the colonial regime slowed the development of the independence movement. Dissidents and exiles throughout the Caribbean, Gulf of Mexico, and the Atlantic developed connections and solidarity to plan and launch three wars to end Spanish rule. Spanning thirty years, the Ten Years' War (1868–1878), the Little War (1879–1880) and the Cuban War of Independence (1895–1898) resulted in severing ties with Spain. During this period, though not independent, Cuba drafted the Constitutions of Guáimaro (1869), Baraguá (1878), Jimaguayú (1895), and La Yaya (1897). These constitutions defined Cubans as anyone, regardless of where they were born, who was directly serving Cuba in the insurgency. Each of them, as did subsequent Cuban constitutions until 1992, interchangeably used the terms citizenship and nationality. In 1886, slavery was abolished under the freedmen regulation, but newly freed slaves were required to work for rations and clothing.

The Spanish crown implemented the Civil Code of 1888 and by royal decree extended the code to its colonies. It became effective in Cuba in 1889. The code combined elements of Roman law with patriarchal Catholic ideas on social order, as had France's Napoleonic Code. Under the code, women had no autonomy and could not administer either their own children or property. Article 22, of the 1888 Civil Code provided that a wife must have the same nationality as her husband. It allowed that if the marriage terminated a wife could repatriate by returning to Cuba and establishing residence, registering her choice to reestablish Cuban nationality with the Civil Registrar, and renouncing her foreign citizenship. A foreign wife who had derived citizenship from her Cuban husband could relinquish her nationality if the marriage was terminated by repatriating to her former nationality or acquiring a new nationality. Married women were unable to relinquish their nationality while married. In the last year of the War of Independence, 1898, the United States intervened against Spain, and in the ensuing Spanish–American War, forced Spain to cede its territories of Cuba, Guam, The Philippines, and Puerto Rico to the United States.

During the occupation of Cuba (1898–1902) by the United States, the first constitution for Cuba as an independent state was drafted in 1901. It excluded women from the rights of citizenship. Rather than attempt to devise a new civil code at that time, the Spanish code remained in effect. Under the 1901 Constitution, a child who was legitimate or legitimized born of a Cuban father was a Cuban national, as was a child born to foreign parents in Cuba and who upon reaching majority, registered in the official Cuban registry. In like manner a legitimate or legitimated child born abroad to native Cubans who had lost their nationality could register as a Cuban national when majority was attained. An illegitimate child born anywhere derived the parent's nationality if the parent who first legally recognized it was Cuban. In the case of simultaneous recognition, only the father's nationality was used to determine nationality. Nationality could be lost by receiving employment or honors of a foreign government without approval of the Senate, obtaining other nationality, or leaving the territory for more than five years, unless one was abroad in service to the government. The Constitution of 1911 and the amended Civil Code of 1929 required a foreign woman who married a Cuban husband to derive his nationality, but Cuban women were no longer required to relinquish their nationality upon marriage to a foreigner.

In 1933, Ángel Alberto Giraudy, Alfredo E. Nogueira, and Herminio Portell Vilá, the Cuban delegates to the Pan-American Union's Montevideo conference, signed the Inter-American Convention on the Nationality of Women, which became effective in 1934, without legal reservations. The following year, interim President of Cuba, Carlos Mendieta produced a provisional constitution which granted women suffrage. In Article 13, the Constitution of 1935 also specified that neither marriage or dissolution of a marriage effected the nationality status of a spouse or children, that Cuban women married to foreigners retained their Cuban nationality, and that a foreign woman married to a Cuban man could choose to keep her original nationality or acquire Cuban nationality. The 1940 Constitution of Cuba declared in Article 20 equality under the law for all Cubans and outlawed discrimination based on class, race, sex, or skin color. It specified that naturalized Cubans who returned to their country of birth for three years or more, lost Cuban nationality and reduced the residency requirement for a foreigner married to a Cuban to two years. After a suspension of the constitution between 1952 and 1959, the 1940 Constitution was restored and remained in effect with modifications until adoption of the 1976 Constitution.
