= List of Guggenheim Fellowships awarded in 1932 =

Fifty-seven scholars and artists received Guggenheim Fellowships in 1932.

== 1932 U.S. and Canadian Fellows ==
Category	Field of Study	Fellow	Institutional association	Research topic	Notes	Ref
Creative Arts	Choreography	Martha Graham	Neighborhood Playhouse School of the Theatre	Native dances from Mexico and Yucatán	Also won in 1943 and 1944	
Creative Arts	Fiction	Louis Adamic		Industrial and sociological research; wrote The Native's Return (published 1934)		
Creative Arts	Fiction	Caroline Gordon Tate		Novel writing		
Creative Arts	Fiction	Evelyn Scott		Novel concerned with the influence of the post-war attitude of 'disillusion' on a romantic woman's temperament		
Creative Arts	Fine Arts	Benjamin Greenstein		Drawing and painting		
Creative Arts	Fine Arts	Peter Blume		Painting	Also won in 1936	
Creative Arts	Fine Arts	Howard Norton Cook		Etching, wood engraving, and lithography	Also won in 1934	
Creative Arts	Fine Arts	Andrew Dasburg		Painting and study of contemporary Mexican Fresco painting		
Creative Arts	Fine Arts	Mitchell Fields		Sculpture	Also won in 1935	
Creative Arts	Fine Arts	Ernest Fiene		Painting		
Creative Arts	Fine Arts	John B. Flannagan		Sculpture		
Creative Arts	Fine Arts	Peppino Mangravite	Ethical Culture Fieldston School	Painting	Also won in 1936	
Creative Arts	Fine Arts	Antonio Salemme		Sculpture	Also won in 1936	
Creative Arts	Music Composition	George Antheil		Composing	Also won in 1933	
Creative Arts	Music Composition	Adolph Weiss		Composing		
Creative Arts	Music Composition	Mark Wessel		Composing	Also won in 1930	
Creative Arts	Poetry	H. L. Davis		Historical-dramatic poem, giving an account of the earliest pioneer settlements in the Northwest		
Creative Arts	Poetry	George Dillon		Writing	Also won in 1933	
Humanities	Architecture, Planning and Design	Lewis Mumford		Completion of a book on form	Also won in 1938 and 1956	
Humanities	Biography	Howard Mumford Jones	University of Michigan	Thomas Moore as representative of "regency" taste in literature	Also won in 1935 and 1964	
Humanities	Classics	Levi Arnold Post	Haverford College	Text tradition of Plato's Laws		
Humanities	East Asian Studies	Owen Lattimore			Also won in 1930	
Humanities	French Literature	Norman Lewis Torrey	Yale University	Biography of Voltaire	Also won in 1954	
Humanities	German and Scandinavian Literature	Edwin Hermann Zeydel	University of Cincinnati	Ludwig Tieck		
Humanities	Iberian and Latin American History	Frank Tannenbaum		Comparative studies of agriculture in Peru and Argentina	Also won in 1934	
Humanities	Latin American Literature	J. Frank Dobie	University of Texas	Collection of tales told by Mexicans in Northern Mexico and preparation of a book that reflects the character and history both of these people and their country		
Humanities	Literary Criticism	Fulmer Mood	Harvard University and Radcliffe College	History of American Colonial ideas	Also won in 1934	
Humanities	Medieval Literature	Anselm Strittmatter	St. Anselm's Priory and Trinity Washington University	History of church worship	Also won in 1937	
Humanities	Medieval Literature	Earl Morse Wilbur	Pacific Unitarian School for the Ministry	History of the Socinianism-Unitarian movement as a movement toward freedom, reason and tolerance in religion		
Humanities	Philosophy	F. S. C. Northrop	Yale University	Determination of the nature of mathematical and logical form		
Humanities	Spanish and Portuguese Literature	Isaac Goldberg	Harvard University	Modern literature of Spanish and Portuguese America		
Humanities	Spanish and Portuguese Literature	Arturo Torres Rioseco	University of California	Spanish-American novel	Also won in 1928	
Natural Science	Chemistry	Herbert Orion Calvery	University of Michigan Medical School	Embryonic protein metabolism with special reference to the chemistry of ovalbumin and ovovitellin and the time of the appearance of the proteolytic enzymes in the developing chick embryo		
Natural Science	Chemistry	Theodore William Richards	Princeton University	Application of the method of statistics and quantum mechanics to surface phenomena		
Natural Science	Chemistry	Oliver Reynolds Wulf	U.S. Department of Agriculture			
Natural Science	Medicine and Health	Samuel Gelfan	University of Alberta	Nature of the submaximal contractions of the single muscle fiber		
Natural Science	Organismic Biology and Ecology	Hermann Joseph Muller	University of Texas	Problems concerning the mechanism of mutation and evolution and the nature of the genre, with particular reference to certain results concerning mutation		
Natural Science	Organismic Biology and Ecology	Karl Patterson Schmidt	The Field Museum	Amphibians and reptiles of upper Central America		
Natural Science	Physics	Francis Arthur Jenkins	University of California	Measurement and interpretation of intensities in band spectra	Also won in 1947 and 1958	
Natural Science	Physics	Robert Sanderson Mulliken			Also won in 1929	
Natural Science	Plant Sciences	Ivan Murray Johnston	Arnold Arboretum	Problem of dispersal of plants in the Western Hemisphere and the manner in which plants in the Western United States were transferred to Central America		

== 1932 Latin American and Caribbean Fellows ==
Category	Field of Study	Fellow	Institutional association	Research topic	Notes	Ref
Humanities	American Literature	Julio Fingerit	Ministry of Education in Buenos Aires	Contemporary literature in the United States		
Humanities	Architecture, Planning and Design	Fernando Devilat Rocca	Pontifical Catholic University of Chile	Architecture of hospitals and organization of hospital services in the United States		
Humanities	Architecture, Planning and Design	Ángel Guido	National University of the Littoral	Architecture and city planning in the United States		
Humanities	Iberian and Latin American History	Herminio Portell Vilá	University of Havana	Cuba–United States relations	Also won in 1931 and 1933	
Natural Science	Engineering	Nicanor Alurralde	Argentine State Railway	Problems of railway engineering and management in the United States		
Natural Science	Medicine and Health	Donato G. Alarcón Martínez	National Autonomous University of Mexico	Treatment of tuberculosis		
Natural Science	Medicine and Health	Juan Farill y Solares	Department of Public Health, Mexico	Clinical theory and practice of orthopedics with special reference to the nonsurgical treatment of deformities in children	Also won in 1933	
Natural Science	Organismic Biology and Ecology	Carlos G. Aguayo y Castro			Also won in 1931	
Natural Science	Organismic Biology and Ecology	Enrique Beltrán			Also won in 1933	
Natural Science	Organismic Biology and Ecology	Tomás Leandro Marini	Department of Agriculture, Argentina	Marine biology, oceanography, and pisciculture in the United States		
Natural Science	Plant Sciences	Manuel Elgueta Guérin	Sociedad Nacional de Agricultura	Theoretical genetics and application of genetics to the improvement of plants	Also won in 1930	
Natural Science	Plant Sciences	José A. Nolla		Inheritance of disease resistance in tobacco	Also won in 1933	
Social Sciences	Education	Aída Laso Correa	University of Chile	Organization of educational guidance and students' welfare in certain universities in the United States		

== See also ==
- Guggenheim Fellowship
- List of Guggenheim Fellowships awarded in 1931
- List of Guggenheim Fellowships awarded in 1933
