= Mark Wessel (composer) =

American pianist and composer

Mark Wessel (March 26, 1894 – May 9, 1973) was an American pianist and composer.

== Life ==
Wessel was born in Coldwater, Michigan, and graduated from Northwestern School of Music, now known as Bienen School of Music; he later taught piano and theory there. When Wessel left Northwestern, he became a professor of piano and composition at the University of Colorado in Boulder.

Wessel was a former pupil of Arnold Schoenberg. He was twice awarded Guggenheim Fellowships, in 1930 and 1932. He was also the recipient in 1930 of a Pulitzer Scholarship to further his education in Europe. In the 1938 contest of the New York Philharmonic-Symphony Society his choral-orchestral work The King of Babylon won honorable mention, while his former student David Van Vactor won the competition with his Symphony in D.

He died on May 9, 1973, in Orchard Lake, Oakland County, Michigan.

== Selected compositions ==
- Adagio, for orchestra
- Allegro pomposo, for two pianos (pub. 1982)
- The Amorous Peacock, for piano
- Ballade, for solo violin, solo oboe, string orchestra (1931)
- Ballade, for violin and piano (1937)
- Concertino, for flute or violin and chamber orchestra (1928)
- Concerto, for piano and orchestra (1941)
- The Day Is No More (words by Rabindranath Tagore), for voice and piano (1919)
- The Departure, for orchestra (1922)
- Etude in G Minor, for piano (before 1947)
- Feminine Conversations and Promenade of Respectable People, for piano (pub. 1931)
- The King of Babylon, for mixed chorus and orchestra (1933)
- Holiday, overture for orchestra (1932)
- The Hour Comes When One May Question Fate, for orchestra (1922)
- Lento Fantasia, for horn and piano (pub. 1941)
- Meerestille (words by Nicolaus Lenau), for voice, viola, violoncello (or horn in C), and piano
- 1945, for orchestra
- Nocturne, for piano
- Original Theme and Four Fantasies, for horn (1979)
- Plains and Mountains, for violin, cello, and piano
- Poem, for orchestra and piano solo (1924)
- Prelude and Fugue, for string quartet (1931)
- Prisms, for two pianos
- Quintet
- Sacred Dances, for piano
- Scherzo, for horn and piano (pub. 1941)
- Scherzo burlesque, for piano and orchestra (ca. 1931)
- Seven Ages of Man, for orchestra
- Sextet, for woodwind and piano (ca. 1931)
- Sonata, for four horns
- Sonata, for violin and piano
- Sonata, for cello and piano (before 1947)
- Sonatine, for piano (before 1937)
- Song and Dance, for orchestra (1933)
- Southern Tour, for piano (pub. 1982)
- String Quartet no. 1 (1931)
- String Quartet no. 2 (ca. 1938)
- String Serenade, for solo violin and string orchestra
- Suite, for large orchestra (and baritone voice in second movement) (1928)
- Symphony (1932)
- Symphony Concertante, for piano and horn with orchestra (1929)
- Theme and Variations on "I've Got a Gal in Summer School", for two pianos, organ, and orchestra
- Two Concert Pieces for the Piano, "Green River" (Symmetrical Toccata) and "Isle Of Death" (pub. 1926)

== Discography ==
- Leonardo De Lorenzo, flautista e compositore: registrazioni storiche 1928–1935 (includes Mark Wessel, Concertino for flute and orchestra, together with works by Ary van Leeuwen, Charles Tomlinson Griffes, and Gian-Luca Petrucci). 1 CD. [n.p.]: Valdom, 2000.
