= Bridgman effect =

The Bridgman effect (named after P. W. Bridgman), also called the internal Peltier effect, is a phenomenon that occurs when an electric current passes through an anisotropic crystal – there is an absorption or liberation of heat because of the non-uniformity in current distribution.

The Bridgman effect is observable in geology. It describes stick-slip behavior of materials under very high pressure.
