= Bridgman seal =

High-pressure seal invented by and named after Percy Williams Bridgman

A Bridgman seal, invented by and named after Percy Williams Bridgman, can be used to seal a pressure chamber and compress its contents to high pressures (up to 40,000 MPa), without the seal leaking and releasing the pressure.

The top is outside the pressure vessel; the bottom is inside. The topmost cylinder is the drive piston; it has an external force applied to it to pressurize the vessel.The six squares are cross-sections through three rings; the topmost (dark gray) one is a hard material, the middle one a softer one, and the bottom one a much softer one. Bridgman originally used hard steel, softer steel, and rubber. The rubber would actually protrude into a groove in the soft steel ring above, to help hold it in place (not shown). The upturned T shape is a horizontal disk on a vertical shaft; it compresses these rings when the pressure vessel is pressurized. The blue cylinder is the sample being compressed.

A cylindrical driving piston is mounted within a cylindrical channel that is closed at its far end. This piston presses against a hard steel ring, followed by a softer steel ring, and then a ring of more viscous or elastic material such as rubber, copper, or soapstone, all within the channel. These three intermediate stages provide an inner cylinder, and the third stage bears on a specially shaped final steel piston that applies the force to pressurize material held at the end of the outer, enclosing channel. The final piston consists of a wider portion that fills the main channel, and a narrower cylindrical extension that leads back through the inner channel formed by the three ring-shaped intermediate stages, ending within the hard steel ring without making direct contact with the driving piston. This arrangement ensures that higher pressures create tighter seals that resist any leakage from the material at the end, since the pressure within the last and softest ring is greater than that in the material at the end.

This arrangement has much in common with the earlier de Bange breech obturator system used to prevent the escape of gases from breech loading artillery, whether inspired by that or independently invented, with the important further feature that Bridgman's system does not merely resist the escape of material under pressure while stationary, it applies that pressure by movement within the pressurising equipment.

Bridgman's previous pressurizing arrangement, a screw with a 2-m spanner, allowed him to get pressures of up to 400 MPa; the Bridgman seal allowed pressures up to 40,000 MPa. These are typical pressures expected in the Earth's internal structure. This advance allowed him to make many discoveries, including the high-pressure phases of ice (still known by the Bridgman nomenclature), high-pressure minerals, and novel high-pressure material properties. These discoveries were important in many fields of science and engineering. Bridgman won a Nobel Prize in 1946 for his work.
