= Lila Morris O'Neale =

Cultural anthropologist from US

- Born: November 2, 1886; Buxton, North Dakota, US
- Died: February 2, 1948 (aged 61); Oakland, California, US
- Occupation: university professor

Lila Morris O'Neale (November 2, 1886 – February 2, 1948) was an American anthropologist and historian of textiles. She was awarded a Guggenheim Fellowship in 1931 for her research on prehistoric textiles in Peru.

== Early life and education ==
Lila Morris O'Neale was born in Buxton, North Dakota, the daughter of George Lester O'Neale (an immigrant from Ireland) and Carrie Higgins O'Neale. She moved with her family to San Jose, California as a girl. She trained as a teacher, like her mother before her; she attended the state teachers college in San Jose, and earned an A. B. at Stanford University (1910); she completed a bachelor's degree from Columbia University in 1916. In 1926, she left a university job to pursue graduate studies in decorative arts at the University of California at Berkeley. She earned a master's degree in 1927 with a thesis on ancient Peruvian fabrics, and in 1930 was granted a Ph.D. in anthropology from Berkeley, at age 44, for a fieldwork study of the basketry methods of California Native American women weavers. Her dissertation project, "Yurok-Karok Basket Weavers", was overseen by anthropologist Alfred L. Kroeber, who remained a supportive colleague.

== Career ==
O'Neale taught school in Oakland, and worked in higher education at San Jose State University and the Stout Institute. She taught Household Art at Oregon State University in Corvallis. In 1922, she taught two courses in the summer session at the University of Southern California.

After a break for graduate studies, she returned to academic employment, as a professor in Household Art (later renamed the Department of Decorative Art in 1939) at Berkeley. She became a full professor in 1941. She taught courses on the history, design, and analysis of textiles and costumes. She also served as Associate Curator of Textiles at the Museum of Anthropology on campus. She was the first woman to teach an anthropology course at Berkeley, when she covered courses for Edward Winslow Gifford, while he was on leave in 1931.

The Paracas textiles had been found in the 1920s in Peru. O'Neale was awarded a Guggenheim Fellowship in 1931 to support travel to Lima, Peru for her work on Inca and pre-Inca textiles in South America.

== Publications ==
On both historical and anthropological topics, O'Neale was a hands-on scholar, determined to recreate the patterns and textures of the works she studied.

- 1921 You and Your Clothes (Oregon Agricultural College Extension Bulletin 33)
- 1927 Design, Structural and Decorative, with Color Distribution Characteristic of Ancient Peruvian Fabrics (M.A. thesis, Department of Household Art, University of California at Berkeley)
- 1930 Review of Coiled Basketry in British Columbia and the Surrounding Region, by Franz Boas, H.K. Haeberlin, James A. Teit, and Helen H. Roberts. American Anthropologist 32:306.
- 1930 "Textile Periods in Ancient Peru: I", University of California Publications in American Archaeology and Ethnology 28:23-56 (with Alfred L. Kroeber)
- 1932 Yurok-Karok Basket Weavers
- 1933 "A Peruvian Multicolored Patchwork", American Anthropologist 35:87-94.
- 1934 "Peruvian "Needleknitting", American Anthropologist 36:405-430.
- 1942 Textile Periods in Ancient Peru: II: Paracas Caverns and the Grand Necropolis
- 1943 "Papago Color Designations" American Anthropologist 45:387-397 (with Juan Dolores)
- 1945 "An Analysis of the Central Asian Silks Excavated by Sir Aurel Stein", Southwestern Journal of Anthropology 1:392-446.(with Dorothy Durrell)
- 1945 Textiles of Highland Guatemala
- 1948 Textile Periods in Ancient Peru: III, The Gauze Weaves, University of California Publications in American Archaeology and Ethnology 40:143-222. (with Bonnie Jean Clark)
- 1949 Chincha Plain-Weave Cloths, Carnegie Institution of Washington Publication 567
- 1949 "Basketry" and "Weaving." In Julian Steward (ed.), Handbook of South American Indians, Vol 5: Comparative Ethnology of South American Indians pp. 69-138. Washington, D.C.: Bureau of American Ethnology.
- 1976 Notes on Pottery Making in Highland Peru. In Nawpa Pacha 14:41-60. John Howland Rowe and Patricia J. Lyon, eds. Berkeley, Calif.: Institute of Andean Studies.

== Personal life ==
O'Neale was "life-long companion" of Martha Thomas, a fellow scholar of Household Art, who taught in San Jose. They hosted social gatherings together at O'Neale's house, and traveled together. O'Neale died from pneumonia in 1948, aged 61 years, just three days after giving her last examination. Her papers are at the Bancroft Library at Berkeley.
