= Abraham Cornelius Benjamin =

American philosopher of science

Abraham Cornelius Benjamin (25 August 1897 – 19 October 1968) was an American philosopher of science who taught at University of Chicago and University of Missouri.

A. C. Benjamin was born in Grand Rapids, Michigan. He attended the University of Michigan, graduating with a B.A. in 1920. Continuing there, he studied "the logical atomism of Bertrand Russell", submitted his thesis on the topic, graduating Ph.D. in 1924.

The University of Illinois employed him as assistant professor of philosophy from 1925 to 1932. He was awarded a Guggenheim Fellowship in 1930. Then University of Chicago employed him similarly until 1945 when he became department chairman in philosophy at University of Missouri.

While in Chicago he wrote three books, first positing a logical structure to science, then a beginning description of the philosophy of science, and a course on values, methods, and concepts. In 1950 he presented "a history of philosophical systems" for an anthology on philosophy of the sciences. He described operationalism in a book in 1955, and a decade later a consideration of sciences related to human values and technology.

Benjamin retired from the department chair in 1956 and from teaching in 1966. He died 19 October 1968 in Columbia, Missouri.

== Works ==
- 1936: The Logical Structure of Science
- 1937: Introduction to the Philosophy of Science via Internet Archive
- 1940: Methods, Values and Concepts course
- 1950: "A History of Philosophical Systems"
- 1955: Operationism via HathiTrust
- 1965: Science, Technology and Human Values
