= The Myth of the Negro Past =

1941 monograph by Melville J. Herskovits

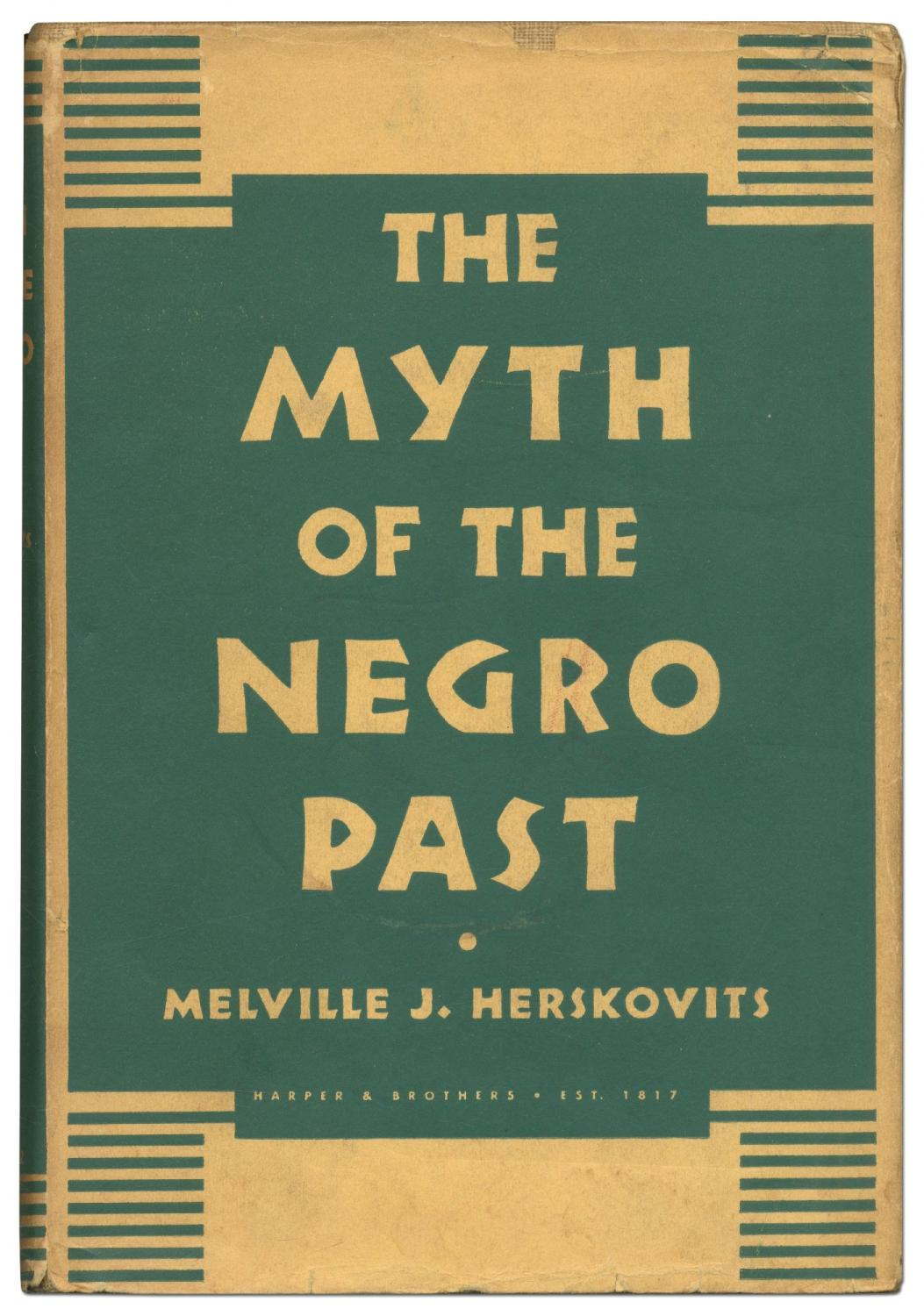
- Cover of first edition
- Author: Melville J. Herskovits
- Language: English
- Published: 1941
- Publisher: Harper & Brothers
- Publication place: United States

The Myth of the Negro Past is a 1941 monograph by Melville J. Herskovits intended to debunk the myth that African Americans lost their African culture due to their experience of slavery. The book was the first publication of the Carnegie Corporation's Study of the American Negro and took 15 years to research.

Herskovits argued that African Americans had retained their heritage from Africa in music, art, social structure, family life, religion, and speech patterns.

The book became controversial because it was feared its arguments could be used by proponents of racial segregation to prove that African Americans could not be assimilated into mainstream American society, although Herskovits himself believed that recovering the more sophisticated African cultural norms was itself important in fighting American racism.

== Bibliography ==
- Gershenhorn, Jerry (2004). "Subverting the Myth of the Negro Past". Melville J. Herskovits and the Racial Politics of Knowledge. University of Nebraska Press. pp. 93–121. ISBN 9780803221871.
- Jackson, Walter (1987). "Melville Herskovits and the Search for Afro-American Culture". In Stocking, George W. (ed.). Malinowski, Rivers, Benedict and Others: Essays on Culture and Personality. University of Wisconsin Press. pp. 95–126. ISBN 9780299107338.
- Raboteau, Albert J. (2004) [1978]. Slave religion: the "invisible institution" in the antebellum South (Updated ed.). Oxford; New York: Oxford University Press. ISBN 978-0-19-517413-7.
