= Jean Herskovits =

American historian (1935–2019)

- Born: Jean Frances Herskovits; May 20, 1935; Evanston, Illinois, U.S.
- Died: February 5, 2019 (aged 83); New York, U.S.
- Education: Swarthmore College (BA); University of Oxford (DPhil)
- Occupation: Professor
- Spouse: John Corry
- Parent(s): Melville J. Herskovits and Frances Shapiro Herskovits

Jean Frances Herskovits (May 20, 1935 – February 5, 2019) was an American historian and academic who was a research professor of history at the State University of New York at Purchase specializing in African (particularly Nigerian) history and politics. Herskovits taught at Brown University, Swarthmore College, City College of the City University of New York and Columbia University. She held a D.Phil. in African history from Oxford University.

== Early life and education ==
Jean Frances Herskovits was born in Evanston, Illinois, on May 20, 1935, to anthropologists Melville J. Herskovits and Frances Shapiro Herskovits. She received her Bachelor of Arts degree from Swarthmore College in 1956, and earned her Doctor of Philosophy (D.Phil.) from Oxford University in 1960 under professor Kenneth Kirkwood, writing her dissertation on freed slaves who returned to Africa and the Lagos Colony.

== Career ==
Jean Herskovits taught at Brown University, Swarthmore College, The City College of New York, and Columbia University. She was a professor at the State University of New York, Purchase, since 1977. Herskovits' thesis, "A Preface to Modern Nigeria: The Sierra Leonians in Yoruba," was written on a 1958 research trip to Nigeria and published in 1965. From 1998 to 2005, she was a director of United Bank for Africa, where she also chaired the Board of Trustees of the UBA Foundation. She served as head of the Nigeria reinvestment project of Citizens Energy Corporation, and from 2001 to 2008 was a member of Conoco Phillips’ Nigeria advisory council.

She wrote many articles about Nigeria in publications such as Foreign Policy and The New York Times.

== Death ==
Herskovits died on February 5, 2019, in New York. She was married to John Corry, a former reporter with The New York Times, with whom she had three daughters.
