= Melville J. Herskovits =

American anthropologist (1895–1963)

Melville Herskovits
- Born: Melville Jean Herskovits; September 10, 1895; Bellefontaine, Ohio, U.S.
- Died: February 25, 1963 (aged 67); Evanston, Illinois, U.S.
- Education: University of Chicago (BPhil); Columbia University (MA, PhD)
- Known for: African-American studies African studies
- Spouse: Frances Shapiro (m. 1924)
- Children: Jean
- Scientific career
- Fields: Anthropology
- Workplaces: Northwestern University
- Doctoral advisor: Franz Boas
- Doctoral students: William Bascom; Erika Eichhorn Bourguignon

Melville Jean Herskovits (September 10, 1895 – February 25, 1963) was an American anthropologist who helped to first establish African and African Diaspora studies in American academia. He is known for exploring the cultural continuity from African cultures as expressed in African-American communities. He worked with his wife, Frances (Shapiro) Herskovits (also an anthropologist) in the field in South America, the Caribbean and Africa. They jointly wrote several books and monographs.

== Early life, family and education ==
Born to Jewish immigrants in Bellefontaine, Ohio, in 1895, Herskovits attended local public schools. He served in the United States Army Medical Corps in France during World War I.

Following his military service, he went to college at the University of Chicago, earning a Bachelor of Philosophy in 1920. He moved to New York City for graduate work, earning his M.A. and Ph.D. in anthropology from Columbia University under the guidance of the German-born American anthropologist Franz Boas. This subject was in its early decades of being developed as a formal field of study. Herskovits's dissertation The Cattle Complex in East Africa investigated theories of power and authority in Africa as expressed in the ownership and raising of cattle. He studied how some aspects of African culture and traditions were expressed in African-American culture in the 1900s.

Among his fellow students were future anthropologists Katherine Dunham, Ruth Benedict, Margaret Mead, Elsie Clews Parsons, and Frances Shapiro. He and Shapiro married in Paris, France, in 1924. They later had a daughter, Jean Herskovits, who became a historian.

== Career ==
In 1927, Herskovits became a full-time anthropologist at Northwestern University in Evanston, Illinois. In 1928 and 1929 he and his wife Frances Herskovits conducted field work in Suriname, among the Saramaka (then called Bush Negroes), and jointly wrote a book about the people.

In 1934, Herskovits and his wife Frances spent more than three months in the Haitian village of Mirebalais, the findings of which research he published in his 1937 book Life in a Haitian Valley. In its time, this work was considered one of the most accurate depictions of the Haitian practice of Vodou. They meticulously detailed the lives and Vodou practices of Mirebalais residents during their three-month stay. They conducted field work in Benin, Brazil, Haiti, Ghana, Nigeria and Trinidad. In 1938, Herskovits established the new Department of Anthropology at Northwestern.

In the early 1940s, Herskovits and his wife Frances met Barbara Hadley Stein, who was in Brazil to do research on the abolition of slavery there. She introduced to them Stanley J. Stein, a graduate student in Latin American history at Harvard University. With advice from Herskovits, Stein and Stein started recording Jongo songs, which in 2013 received scholarly attention. Herskovits also influenced Alan Lomax, who collected African-American songs.

In 1948, Herskovits founded the first major interdisciplinary American program in African studies at Northwestern University, with the aid of a three-year $30,000 grant from the Carnegie Foundation, followed by a five-year $100,000 grant from the Ford Foundation in 1951. The Program of African Studies was the first of its kind at a United States academic institution. The goals of the program were to "produce scholars of competence in their respective subjects, who will focus the resources of their special fields on the study of aspects of African life relevant to their disciplines."

The Melville J. Herskovits Library of African Studies at Northwestern University, established in 1954, is the largest separate Africana collection in the world. To date, it contains more than 260,000 bound volumes, including 5,000 rare books, more than 3,000 periodicals, journals and newspapers, archival and manuscript collections, 15,000 books in 300 different African languages, extensive collections of maps, posters, videos and photographs, as well as electronic resources. In 1957, Herskovits founded the African Studies Association and was the organization's first president.

Herskovits's book The Myth of the Negro Past is about African cultural influences on African Americans; it rejects the notion that African-Americans lost all traces of their past when they were taken from Africa and enslaved in America. He traced numerous elements expressed in the contemporary African-American culture that could be traced to African cultures. Herskovits emphasized race as a sociological concept, not a biological one. He also helped forge the concept of cultural relativism, particularly in his book Man and His Works. This book examines in depth the effects of westernization on Africans of diverse cultures who were brought during slavery to the Americas, and who then developed a distinctly different African-American culture as a product of this displacement. As LeRoi Jones has commented on this text, some believe that the introduction of these Africans to Christianity is what propelled such westernization. Christian concepts shifted slave narratives from an emphasis on travelling home to their African countries of origin to traveling home to see their Lord, in Heaven. The development of African-American Christian churches, which served as one of the only places to provide these peoples with access to social mobility, further established a distinctly western culture among Africans in America. Along with these churches came Negro spirituals, which are cited as likely the first kind of music native to America made by Africans. Nonetheless, the development of such spirituals included direct influence from the African roots. This became apparent in a number of aspects of the spirituals, from the inclusion of call and response lines and alternate scales to the varied timbres and rhythms. All of this goes to show that Herskovits's claims in this book carry much truth and accuracy in regards to the establishment of the African American identity as descendant of that of the African, and how music played into such shifts.

Herskovits debated with sociologist E. Franklin Frazier on the nature of cultural contact in the Western Hemisphere, specifically with reference to Africans, Europeans, and their descendants. Frazier emphasized how Africans had adapted to their new environment in the Americas. Herskovits was interested in showing elements of continuity from African cultures into the present community.

After World War II, Herskovits publicly advocated independence of African nations from the colonial powers. He strongly criticized American politicians for viewing African nations as objects of Cold War strategy. Frequently called on as an adviser to government, Herskovits served on the Mayor's Committee on Race Relations in Chicago (1945) and the U.S. Senate Foreign Relations Committee (1959–60).

== Legacy and honors ==
- The Melville J. Herskovits Library of African Studies at Northwestern University was named in his honor; it is based on his collection of materials as chairman of the department.
- The Herskovits Prize (Melville J. Herskovits Award) is an annual award given by the African Studies Association to the best scholarly work (including translations) on Africa published in English in the previous year.

== Works ==
- The Cattle Complex in East Africa, PhD Dissertation, 1923 (published as a book in 1926)
- "The Negro's Americanism", in Alain Locke (ed.), The New Negro, 1925
- On the Relation Between Negro-White Mixture and Standing in Intelligence Tests, 1926
- The American Negro, 1928
- Rebel Destiny, Among the Bush Negroes of Dutch Guiana, 1934, with Frances Herskovits
- Suriname Folk Lore, 1936, with Frances Herskovits
- Life in a Haitian Valley, 1937
- Dahomey: An Ancient West African Kingdom (2 vols), 1938
- Economic Life of Primitive People, 1940
- The Myth of the Negro Past, 1941
- Trinidad Village, 1947, with Frances Herskovits
- Man and His Works: The Science of Cultural Anthropology, 1948
- Les bases de L'Anthropologie Culturelle, Paris: Payot, 1952
- Dahomean Narrative: A Cross-Cultural Analysis, 1958, with Frances Herskovits
- Continuity and Change in African Culture, 1959
- The Human Factor in Changing Africa, 1962
- Economic Transition in Africa, 1964

== Further viewing ==
- Smith, Llewellyn; Herbes-Sommers, Christine (February 2, 2010). "Herskovits at the Heart of Blackness | Melville Herskovits". Independent Lens. PBS.
