= Harold Cash =

American sculptor (1895–1977)

- Born: Harold Cheney Cash; September 26, 1895; Chattanooga, Tennessee, US
- Died: 1977 (aged 81–82)
- Education: University of Virginia Art Students League of New York; New York School of Fine and Applied Arts Beaux-Arts Institute of Design
- Occupation: Sculptor
- Honours: Guggenheim Fellowship, 1930 and 1931

Harold Cheney Cash (September 26, 1895 – 1977) was an American sculptor. He received a Guggenheim Fellowship in 1930 and 1931.

== Early life ==
Harold Cheney Cash was born on September 26, 1895, in Chattanooga, Tennessee. He was the son of Elizabeth (nee Cheney) and James Albion Cash, a city commissioner in Chattanooga. His brother was James Robert Cash, later a professor at the University of Virginia School of Medicine.

He attended the Baylor School in Chattanooga. He also attended Leland Stanford Junior University. He enrolled in the University of Virginia. During World War I, he left college and enlisted in the United States Navy, receiving an honorable discharge after one year in January 1919. He graduated from the University of Virginia with an A.B. on June 12, 1919.

In October 1919, he moved to New York City and enrolled in a four-year course the Art Students League of New York. Interested in painting but lacking funds to complete his art studies, Cash became an interior decorator and landscape gardening in New York City. In September 1920, he joined the faculty of the New York School of Fine and Applied Arts. He saved his money and painted on occasion. He received a scholarship from the New York School of Fine and Applied Arts for 1921 and completed his studies in June 1921. He then traveled in Europe to study artl living in Paris, France for two years.

In 1926, Cash left interior decorating to enroll in art school. He studied at the Beaux-Arts Institute of Design in New York City from 1926 to 1928. While there, he tried clay modeling to help break the bad habits he developed in drawing. This led to him becoming a sculptor. Cash said that modeling gave him "a feeling for form which I could not capture in painting".

== Career ==
Cash became a noted sculptor in Paris from 1928 to 1932. One of his early works was a bust of Dr. Lyle B. West, completed in 1929. He was also known for his sculptures of Black people. Cash received a Guggenheim Fellowship in 1930 and 1931. He used these grants to travel to Africa to seek more inspiration.

In 1932, Cash returned to the United States from Paris, living in both Chattanooga and New York City. He maintained a studio in Chattanooga but also established a studio in Greenwich Village, New York City, New York, facing Washington Square Park. In 1933, he created a bust of Edgar Allan Poe for the Raven Society at the University of Virginia. His work was shown at the Chicago World's Fair in 1933. In 1934, he was invited to participate in the New York City's first municipal art exhibit at Rockefeller Center. His contributions to the show included busts and life-sized nudes in bronze, stone, concrete, and wood.

Several of his sketchs are in the collection of the Hunter Museum of American Art in Chattanooga, along with a full-body bronze sculpture called "D'A-Lal", named ofter the French dancer D'al-Al. One of his sculptures, Head of a Woman, is in the collection of the Courtauld Institute of Art in London, England. Another of his sculptures is owned by Washington and Lee University. His other works include busts of his daughter Martha, Allen Tate, artist Catherine Richmond, Montgomery Caldwell, Malcolm Chisholm, Mary Emma Hershfield, John Stagmaire, Dr. Lyle B. West, and the Patton twins of Chattanooga. Head of a Southern Negro was one of his noted works.

He was a member of the National Sculpture Society and the Sculptors Guild.

== Exhibitions ==
- Salon d’Automne, Paris, France, 1928
- Salon des Indépendants, Paris, France, 1929
- Salon des Tuileries, Paris, France 1929
- Exhibition of American Sculpture, San Francisco, California, 1929
- Galerie La Flize, Lille, France, 1929
- Galerie Bernheime Jeune, Paris, France, 1930
- Town Hall Club, New York City, New York, 1930
- Brooklyn Museum, Brooklyn, New York, 1930
- Museum of Modern Art, New York City, New York, April 1930
- Museum of Modern Art, New York City, New York, October 31, 1932 – February 11, 1933
- Art Institute of Chicago, Chicago, Illinois, 1931–1932 and 1936–1938
- Baltimore Museum of Art, Baltimore, Maryland, 1931
- Salons of America, New York City, New York, 1934
- Whitney Museum of American Art, New York City, New York, 1936
- Museum of Modern Art, New York City, New York, May 24, 1938 – July 31, 1938
- Pennsylvania Academy of the Fine Arts, Philadelphia, Pennsylvania, 1941–1945

== Personal life ==
Cash married Alma Dickinson in October 1919 in New York City. She was the daughter of Col. L. T. Dickinson of Chattanooga. They lived in Greenwich Village and had a daughter, Martha Anne. In 1934, he lost custody of his daughter in their divorce because the judge disapproved of his career as an artist. Circuit Court Judge Oscar Yarnell said the profession was "pure and unadulterated bunk". His ex-wife had remarried and had moved to Oklahoma, leaving Martha with Cash's parents.

Cash second wife was Elizabeth Law, the children's book editor for The New York Times. They lived in New York City and spent their summers at the Old Cash Farm in Wildwood, Georgia, where his father had retired. Wlldwood was later Cash's permanent residence. He died in 1977.
