= Jens Rud Nielsen =

Danish-American physicist (1894–1979)

- Born: 22 September 1894; Copenhagen, Denmark
- Died: 20 April 1979 (aged 84); Norman, Oklahoma, U.S.
- Education: University of Copenhagen, Cand.phil., Cand.mag.; California Institute of Technology, PhD
- Spouse: Gertrude Siegmund
- Children: John Rud Nielsen, Thomas Rud Nielsen, Mary Ruth Wilson
- Scientific career
- Fields: Physics

Jens Rud Nielsen (22 September 1894 – 20 April 1979) was born in Copenhagen and was an esteemed physicist at the University of Oklahoma. He immigrated to the United States in 1922. He was awarded the John Simon Guggenheim Fellowship in 1931.

== Personal life ==
Nielsen was born to Niels F. Nielsen and Marie (Johansen) Nielsen on September 22, 1894. He married Gertrude Siegmund, who would become an active public servant physician, on October 19, 1923, and together they had three children: John Rud Nielsen, Mary Ruth Nielsen (a.k.a. Mistress Lejeune Wilson), and Thomas Rud Nielsen.

== Career ==
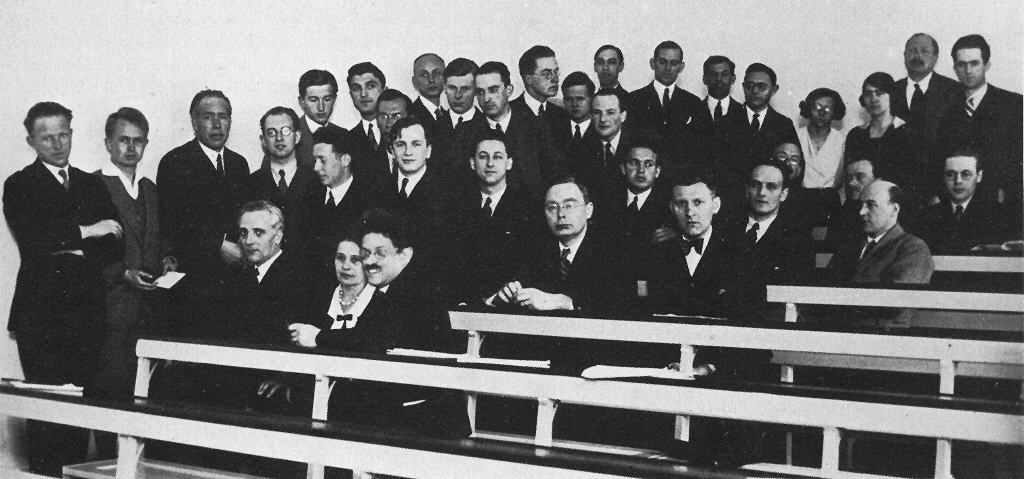
Copenhagen Conference, September 1937. J.R. Nielsen pictured ten persons from the right.

Nielsen entered the University of Copenhagen in the fall semester of 1913, where world-renowned physicist Niels Bohr was a professor. Nielsen attended many of Bohr's lectures during his time at Copenhagen, and later in life they would become friends. Nielsen then graduated from the University of Copenhagen with a master's degree in 1919, and taught at Denmark's Technical University until 1922. He went on to get a Ph.D. from the California Institute of Technology – one of its first to ever have been granted – while spending a year teaching at Humboldt State College. He was employed at the University of Oklahoma from the fall of 1924 on a starting salary of $2,400, and he quickly became acclaimed across the campus for his passion and enthusiasm for research. He went on to be given the award of research professor later in 1944. After a few years at the University of Oklahoma, in 1931 Nielsen went back to Denmark after winning a Guggenheim Fellowship and spent two years at Bohr's Institute, where he was also recognized as a Rask-Oersted Fellow. He and Niels Bohr became such good friends during that time that Bohr would later come halfway across the globe to visit him in 1937 and 1957.

Nielsen was known to have worked and conversed with numerous other notable physicists throughout his two-year duration at Bohr's Institute in the 1930s. He was invited back for the Copenhagen Conference (known for the Copenhagen Interpretation of quantum mechanics) in 1937 – a congregation of the world's leading scientists at the time to informally discuss topical matters such as subatomic particles and their quantum properties. It was organized to round up some of the greatest scientific minds in the hopes of furthering subatomic research efforts and sparking new ideas for development of future physics publications. Pictured above, noteworthy attendees include Niels Bohr, Werner Heisenberg, Lise Meitner and Rudolf E. Peierls (Meitner is noted as a former apprentice of Max Planck and both of them are known for their work on theory involved with atomic bombs), Wolfgang Pauli (the Pauli Exclusion Principle), Otto Frisch (known for his discovery of nuclear fission with Lise Meitner), and Emilio Segrè (famous for discovering the antiproton and for being a group leader on the Manhattan Project and Fat Man bomb). It was during the same year of this conference that Niels Bohr would come to visit Nielsen in the United States, though the exact dates of his visit are unknown.

At the University of Oklahoma, Nielsen – and in some respects his wife Gertrude too – were the ignition for the expansion of scientific research University wide. As principal organizer, Nielsen was asked to create a research program for the university's physics program; however, due to lack of space and financial problems, starting off he was forced to use heat tunnels and old washrooms in the place of laboratories. Overcoming this obstacle, he maintained a career of forty-one years through perhaps some of the world's darkest hours – between the Great Depression (during which he and his wife helped fund several students' education) to the dropping of the atomic bomb. During his time at the University of Oklahoma, Nielsen supervised half of the sixty physics Ph.D. students that would go on to graduate. Eventually, his research program led to the creation of the University of Oklahoma's National Research Institute.

His early work on the photoelectric effect led him to be interested in microscopic imaging, specifically Raman. In 1943, while he was still working for the University of Oklahoma, Nielsen began building a large Raman infrared spectrometer for the Naval Research Laboratory – funded by the Atomic Energy Commission, National Science Foundation, and Naval Research Laboratory. It was completed several years later, and for a time was known as the most powerful prism infrared spectrometer. Nielsen stayed in contact with the Naval Research Laboratory for several years after this project. Together they investigated the vibrational spectra of fluorocarbons and fluorinated hydrocarbons, also analyzing other vital petroleum and chemical components using his instrumentation. Nielsen had publications in numerous journals, including Journal of the Optical Society of America, Fysisk Tidsskrift, Physical Review, Review of Scientific Instruments, The Scientific Monthly, Science, and School Science and Mathematics.

== Awards and honors ==
On November 16, 1971, Nielsen was one of nine Oklahomans inducted into the Oklahoma Hall of Fame. George Lynn Cross, the University of Oklahoma's president at the time, referred to him as "Oklahoma's most distinguished scientist," and subsequently he was named as one of the first four recipients of the George Lynn Cross Professorship for outstanding research. After his retirement from the University of Oklahoma in 1965, the Physics and Astronomy department building (completed in 1946) was renamed Nielsen Hall in his honor. In 1922-1923 he was awarded the American-Scandinavian fellowship from The American-Scandinavian Foundation, the Guggenheim Fellowship in 1931, and the Rask-Oersted Fellowship in 1932. Nielsen was the editor of the Journal of the Optical Society of America, American Journal of Physics, and The Journal of Chemical Physics. Perhaps among his most notable achievements worldwide was his supervision of the first five ceremonial volumes of Niels Bohr's memoirs. He was requested to assist in producing them by the Danish government as well as by Bohr's Institute after Bohr's death in 1962. Finishing four out of five before his own death in 1979, Nielsen spent his retirement years completing these compilations of Bohr's work, acting as editor and translator of four languages. They were presented as a gift to Chairman Mao Tse Tung (Mao Zedong) during Danish prime minister Poul Hartling's visit to China in 1974.

Today, a collection of fifty illustrations printing blocks and over one thousand glass lantern slides from Nielsen's works are available for viewing through the University of Oklahoma's libraries and its History of Science Collections. Additionally, physical instruments used by Nielsen himself can be seen on display on the fifth floor of the Bizzell Memorial Library. This collection was made possible through a grant of $9,173 from the American Institute of Physics, since studying his original papers had been difficult due to translation issues as well as poor storage conditions causing them to be dusty and brittle.
