= Edward A. Weeks =

Edward Augustus Weeks Jr. (February 19, 1898 – March 11, 1989) was an American writer, essayist, and editor of The Atlantic. He died in 1989 at the age of 91.

Weeks was born in Elizabeth, New Jersey. He attended Cornell and Harvard universities before he earned an LL.D. degree from Cambridge. He sold books for Boni & Liberight before he went to work at The Atlantic. Four years later, he became editor of the Atlantic Monthly Press, and in 1938 he was named editor of The Atlantic.

Weeks' higher education was interrupted when he volunteered for service during World War I. He won the Croix de Guerre for his work driving an ambulance for the American Field Service.

Weeks wrote for, and was the host of, Meet Mr. Weeks, a literary talk radio program on the Blue Network from November 7, 1939, until March 11, 1941. Each episode of the 30-minute program included Weeks' interview of a guest from the press, higher education, publishing, or theater.

Weeks had two brothers. His first wife was Frederica Watriss, who died in 1970. They had a son and a daughter. He married Phoebe-Lou Adams in 1971, and they remained wed until his death. On March 11, 1989, Weeks died in his sleep at his home in Thompson, Connecticut.

== Publications ==
- This Trade of Writing. Boston: Little, Brown and Company. 1935. OCLC 327540.
- The Open Heart. Boston: Little, Brown and Company. 1955. OCLC 334736.
- In Friendly Candor. Boston: Little, Brown. 1959. OCLC 284856.
- Breaking Into Print: An Editor's Advice on Writing. Boston: The Writer, Inc. 1962. OCLC 326824.
- The Lowells and Their Institute. Boston: Little, Brown and Company. 1966. OCLC 785199.
- Fresh Waters. Boston: Little, Brown and Company. 1968. OCLC 560628.
- The Moisie Salmon Club: A Chronicle. Barre, MA: Barre Publishers. 1971. ISBN 978-0827171213.
- My Green Age. Boston: Little, Brown. 1973. ISBN 978-0316927901.
- Writers and Friends. New York: Little, Brown. 1981. ISBN 978-0316927918.
