= Percy W. Bridgman House =

Historic house in Massachusetts, United States

- U.S. National Register of Historic Places
- U.S. National Historic Landmark
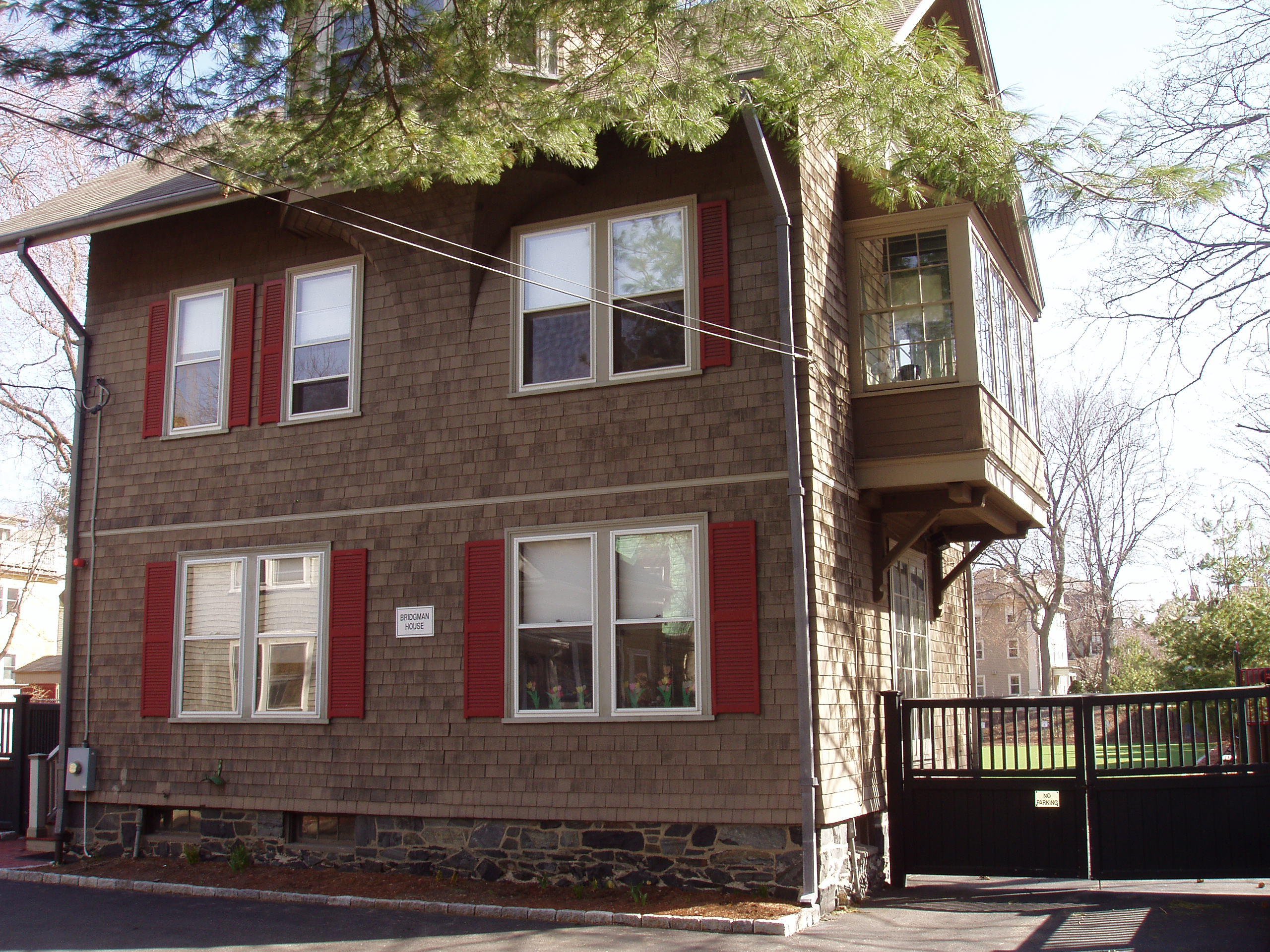
- Percy W. Bridgman House.

- Location within Massachusetts Location within the United States
- Location: Cambridge, Massachusetts
- Coordinates: 42°22′44.69″N 71°7′44.32″W
- Built: 1920
- NRHP reference No.: 75000298

Significant dates
- Added to NRHP: May 15, 1975
- Designated NHL: May 15, 1975

The Percy W. Bridgman House is an historic house at 10 Buckingham Place in Cambridge, Massachusetts, United States. It is a National Historic Landmark, notable for its associations with Dr. Percy Williams Bridgman, a physicist, Nobel Prize winner, and Harvard University professor. It is now part of the Buckingham Browne & Nichols (BBN) Lower School campus.

The house is an architecturally undistinguished 2 1/2 story house built about 1920 in a Neo-Rationalist style. At the time of its designation as a National Historic Landmark in 1975, the house had not been significantly altered since Dr. Bridgman's death in 1961. It was acquired by the BBN School not long after his death, which has used it for a variety of purposes, including as a faculty residence and lounge. It is used for school offices.

Percy Bridgman (1882–1961) was born in Cambridge, raised in Newton, and educated at Harvard. After receiving his Ph.D. in physics in 1908, he was invited to join the Harvard physics faculty, where he remained for the rest of his life. Bridgman's primary area of research was high pressure physics. He was awarded the Nobel Prize in Physics (the fifth American to be so honored) in 1946 for his development of equipment for advancing research in that field. He also wrote extensively on the epistemology of physics and the sciences, advancing an idea that became known as operationalism, the view that the concept underlying any measurement was synonymous with a corresponding set of operations performed in making the measurement. Bridgman moved into this house in 1928, and lived there for the rest of his life.

== See also ==
- List of National Historic Landmarks in Massachusetts
- National Register of Historic Places listings in Cambridge, Massachusetts
