= Proxy (statistics) =

Variable used in place of another variable

In statistics, a proxy or proxy variable is a variable that serves in place of an unobservable or immeasurable variable, while not being otherwise relevant in its own right. In order for a variable to be a good proxy, it must have a close correlation, not necessarily linear, with the variable of interest. This correlation might be either positive or negative.

Proxy variable must relate to an unobserved variable, must correlate with disturbance, and must not correlate with regressors once the disturbance is controlled for.

== Examples ==
In social sciences, proxy measurements are often required to stand in for variables that cannot be directly measured. This process of standing in is also known as operationalization. Per-capita gross domestic product (GDP) is often used as a proxy for measures of standard of living or quality of life. Montgomery et al. examine several proxies used, and point out limitations with each, stating "In poor countries, no single empirical measure can be expected to display all of the facets of the concept of income. Our judgment is that consumption per adult is the best measure among those collected in cross-sectional surveys."

Frost lists several examples of proxy variables:

Proxy variable	Unobserved variable
Tree ring width	Historical climate
GDP per capita	Quality of life
Body mass index	Body fat percentage
Years of education	Intelligence
Grade Point Average	Intelligence
Height growth	Hormone levels

== See also ==
- Instrumental variable
- Latent variable
- Operationalization
- Proxy (climate)
