= Dorothy Johnson Orchard =

American economist (1897-1981)

- Born: March 20, 1897; Alexandria, Virginia, U.S.
- Died: January 28, 1981 (aged 83); Annandale, Virginia, U.S.
- Occupation: Economist
- Spouse: John E. Orchard (m. 1920; died 1962)
- Awards: Guggenheim Fellowship (1931)

Academic background
- Education: Swarthmore College (BA)

Dorothy Johnson Orchard (March 20, 1897 – January 28, 1981) was an American economist. She was a 1931 Guggenheim Fellow and often worked with her husband John E. Orchard.

== Biography ==
Orchard was born on March 20, 1897, in Alexandria, Virginia. She graduated from Central High School and then obtained a BA in Mathematics from Swarthmore College in 1918. She later studied at the New School for Social Research (1921–1922) and Columbia University (1929–1931).

In the late 1910s, Orchard worked as a federal government official at the Department of War's economic history section and the Department of State Bureau of Foreign Affairs. In 1920, she left her job as a mathematics teacher at Western High School amidst her marriage to John E. Orchard that year. She was later a researcher at the National Bureau of Economic Research (1921-1922), the Russell Sage Foundation (1922-1923), Amalgamated Clothing Workers of America (1924-1926), and the Council for Research in the Social Sciences (1926-?).

Orchard wrote scholarly articles for several journals, and one of them, a Political Science Quarterly article, was reprinted as a book named Man Power in China afterwards. She also worked as an assistant for her husband's work, for example contributing six chapters to her husband's 1930 book Japan’s Economic Position: The Progress of Industrialization. In 1931, she was awarded a Guggenheim Fellowship for "a study of the social movements accompanying the industrialization of China". Following the end of World War II, she moved to Paris when her husband was sent there for the Marshall Plan. She was a member of the Society of Women Geographers.

Orchard's husband was an economist who specialized in the East Asia worked as a professor at Columbia University, in 1920; they remained together until his death in 1962. A resident of New York City since 1920, the couple retired to Lincoln, Virginia, and she moved to Arlington following her husband's death. She was an active part of the city's Democratic Party.

Orchard, at the time suffering from cardiovascular illness, died on January 28, 1981 at Sleepy Hollow, a nursing home in Annandale, Virginia.

== Works ==
- (with John E. Orchard) Japan's Economic Position (1930)
- (with Geoffrey May) Moneylending in Great Britain (1933)
- Man Power in China
