= Enrique Beltrán =

Enrique Beltrán Castillo
- Born: 1903
- Died: 1994 (aged 90–91)
- Education: National Autonomous University of Mexico; Columbia University
- Occupation(s): Conservationist, Zoologist, Librarian
- Employers: Institute of Health and Tropical Diseases (Head of Department of Protozoology); Mexican Institute of Renewable Natural Resources (Director)
- Known for: Mexico's first conservationists; founder of the Mexican Institute of Renewable Natural Resources (IMERNAR)
- Awards: Guggenheim Fellowship (1932); Medal of honor from International Union for Conservation of Nature (1966)

Enrique Beltrán Castillo (1903–1994) was one of Mexico's first conservationists. A student of Alfonso Herrera at the UNAM in the 1920s, Beltrán was appointed by Herrera "to head two marine commissions (in 1923 and 1926), that were established to study and improve the use of Mexico's coastal fisheries."

In 1932, Beltrán received a Guggenheim Fellowship "to consult oceanographic archives in the United States and to study protozoology at Columbia University."

After completing his doctorate in zoology at Columbia, from 1939-52 Beltrán headed the Department of Protozoology at Mexico's Institute of Health and Tropical Diseases.

With assistance from the Charles Lathrop Pack Forestry Foundation, in 1952, Beltrán founded the Mexican Institute of Renewable Natural Resources (Instituto Mexicano de Recursos Naturales Renovables, or IMERNAR), one of Mexico's first conservation organizations, serving as its director.

In 1966, he received a medal of honor from the International Union for Conservation of Nature (IUCN).
