= The Logic of Modern Physics =

1927 book by Percy Williams Bridgman

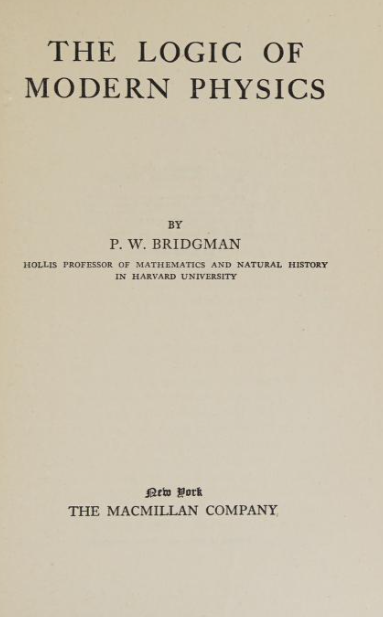
- Title page for The Logic of Modern Physics (1927)
- Author: Percy Williams Bridgman
- Language: English
- Publication date: 1927

The Logic of Modern Physics is a 1927 philosophy of science book by American physicist and Nobel laureate Percy Williams Bridgman. The book is notable for explicitly identifying, analyzing, and explaining operationalism for the first time, and coining the term operational definition. Widely read by scholars in the social sciences, it had a huge influence in the 1930s and 1940s, and its major influence on the field of psychology in particular surpassed even that on methodology in physics, for which it was originally intended.

== History ==
The Logic of Modern Physics is a 1927 philosophy of science book by American physicist and Nobel laureate Percy Williams Bridgman notable for explicitly identifying, analyzing, and explaining operationalism for the first time.

Pragmatic philosophers like Charles Sanders Peirce in the 1870s had already advanced solutions to the related ontological problems.

Also, Sir Arthur Eddington had discussed notions similar to operationalization in 1920 before Bridgman. Bridgman's formulation, however, became the most influential.

In 1955 the variant operationism was described by A. Cornelius Benjamin.

== Influence ==
Operationalism can be considered a variation on the positivist theme.

The book was widely read by scholars in the social sciences, in which it had a huge influence in the 1930s and 1940s, In the social sciences, the main influence has been in psychology (behaviorism), where it has been even greater than that on the methodology in physics, for which it was originally intended. Examples of the influence on psychology in the 1930s and 1940s include Stanley Smith Stevens (The Operational Basis of Psychology and The Operational Definition of Psychological Concepts), and Clark L. Hull (The Principles of Behavior: An Introduction to Behavior Theory). Since then, it has been the central influence of the official epistemology governing psychological method for the whole century."

== See also ==
- Edward C. Tolman
- Heisenberg uncertainty principle
- Henry Schultz
- Herbert A. Simon
- Talcott Parsons
