= Percy Williams Bridgman =

American physicist (1882–1961)

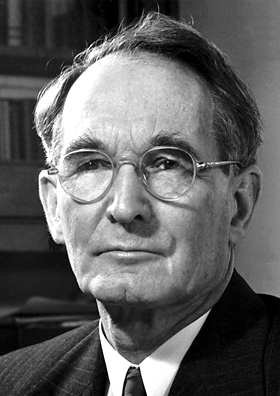
- Bridgman in 1946
- Born: April 21, 1882; Cambridge, Massachusetts, U.S.
- Died: August 20, 1961 (aged 79); Randolph, New Hampshire, U.S.
- Education: Harvard University (grad. 1904, 1905, 1908)
- Known for: Bridgman effect; Bridgman seal; Bridgman–Stockbarger method; High-pressure torsion
- Spouse: Olive Ware (m. 1912)
- Children: 2
- Relatives: Edmund Asa Ware (father-in-law)
- Awards: Rumford Prize (1917); Elliott Cresson Medal (1932); Comstock Prize in Physics (1933); Nobel Prize in Physics (1946); Bingham Medal (1951)
- Scientific career
- Fields: Physics
- Workplaces: Harvard University
- Thesis: Mercury Resistance as a Pressure Gauge (1908)
- Doctoral advisor: Wallace Clement Sabine
- Doctoral students: Francis Birch; Edwin C. Kemble; John C. Slater
- Writing career
- Genre: Philosophy of science
- Notable work: The Logic of Modern Physics (1927)

Percy Williams Bridgman (April 21, 1882 – August 20, 1961) was an American physicist who received the Nobel Prize in Physics in 1946 for his work on the physics of high pressures. He also wrote extensively on the scientific method and on other aspects of the philosophy of science. The Bridgman effect, the Bridgman–Stockbarger technique, and the high-pressure mineral bridgmanite are named after him.

== Early life and education ==
Percy Williams Bridgman was born on April 21, 1882, in Cambridge, Massachusetts, and grew up in nearby Auburndale. His parents were both born in New England. His father, Raymond Landon Bridgman, was "profoundly religious and idealistic" and worked as a newspaper reporter assigned to state politics. His mother, Mary Ann Maria Williams, was described as "more conventional, sprightly, and competitive."

Bridgman attended both elementary and high school in Auburndale, where he excelled at competitions in the classroom, on the playground, and while playing chess. Described as both shy and proud, his home life consisted of family music, card games, and domestic and garden chores. The family was deeply religious; reading the Bible each morning and attending a Congregational Church. However, Bridgman later became an atheist.

In 1900, Bridgman entered Harvard University, where he received his A.B. in 1904, his A.M. in 1905, and his Ph.D. in 1908.

== Career and research ==
From 1910 until his retirement, Bridgman taught at Harvard University, becoming a full professor in 1919. In 1905, he began investigating the properties of matter under high pressure. A machinery malfunction led him to modify his pressure apparatus; the result was a new sealing device enabling him to create pressures eventually exceeding 100,000 kgf/cm^{2} (10 GPa; 100,000 atmospheres). This was a huge improvement over previous machinery, which could achieve pressures of only 3,000 kgf/cm^{2} (0.3 GPa). This new apparatus led to an abundance of new findings, including a study of the compressibility, electric and thermal conductivity, tensile strength and viscosity of more than 100 different compounds. Bridgman is also known for his studies of electrical conduction in metals and properties of crystals. He developed the Bridgman seal and is the eponym for Bridgman's thermodynamic equations, which were used to further his research.

Bridgman made many improvements to his high-pressure apparatus over the years, and unsuccessfully attempted the synthesis of diamond many times. The high-pressure torsion apparatus developed by Bridgman significantly contributed to the development of severe plastic deformation field decades later.

In 1946 he received the Nobel Prize in Physics for his high pressure physics work.

His philosophy of science book The Logic of Modern Physics (1927) advocated operationalism and coined the term operational definition. In 1938 he participated in the International Committee composed to organise the International Congresses for the Unity of Science. He was also one of the 11 signatories to the Russell–Einstein Manifesto.

J. Robert Oppenheimer, the director of the Manhattan Project, was an undergraduate student of Bridgman's. Of his teaching abilities, Oppenheimer said that, "I found Bridgman a wonderful teacher because he never really was quite reconciled to things being the way they were and he always thought them out."

== Personal life and death ==
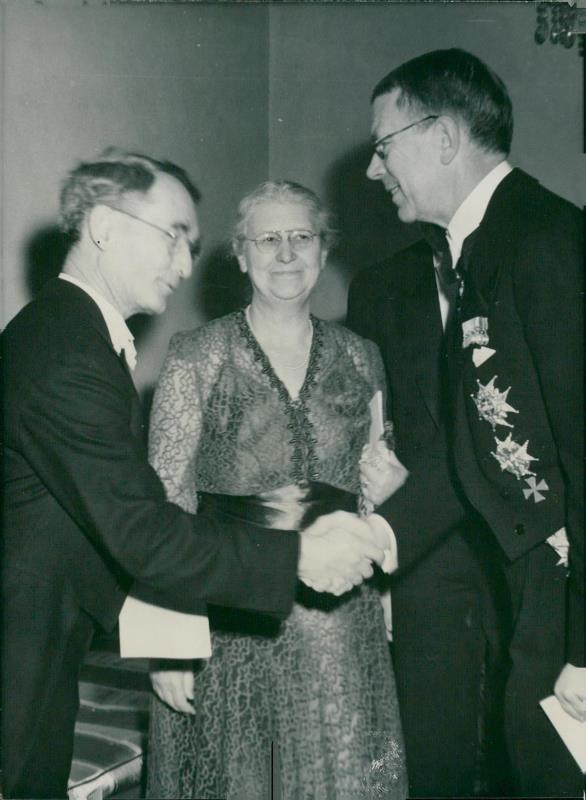
Bridgman with wife and Gustaf VI Adolf of Sweden in Stockholm in 1946

Bridgman married Olive Ware (1882-1972), of Hartford, Connecticut, in 1912. Ware's father, Edmund Asa Ware, was the founder and first president of Atlanta University. The couple had two children and were married for nearly 50 years, living most of that time in Cambridge. The family also had a summer home in Randolph, New Hampshire, where Bridgman was known as a skilled mountain climber.

Bridgman was a "penetrating analytical thinker" with a "fertile mechanical imagination" and exceptional manual dexterity. He was a skilled plumber and carpenter, known to shun the assistance of professionals in these matters. He was also fond of music and played the piano, and took pride in his flower and vegetable gardens.

Bridgman committed suicide by gunshot after suffering from metastatic cancer for some time. His suicide note was a mere two sentences; "It isn't decent for society to make a man do this thing himself. Probably this is the last day I will be able to do it myself." Bridgman's words have been quoted by many in the assisted suicide debate.

== Recognition ==
=== Memberships ===
Year	Organization	Type	Ref.
1912	(United States) American Academy of Arts and Sciences	Member	
1916	(United States) American Philosophical Society	Member	
1918	(United States) National Academy of Sciences	Member	
1949	(United Kingdom) Royal Society	Foreign Member	

=== Awards ===
Year	Organization	Award	Citation	Ref.
1917	(United States) American Academy of Arts and Sciences	Rumford Prize	"For his thermodynamic research at extremely high pressures."	
1932	(United States) Franklin Institute	Elliott Cresson Medal	"For work in high pressure."	
1933	(United States) National Academy of Sciences	Comstock Prize in Physics	"For his investigations leading to increased understanding of the electrical constitution of matter."	
1946	(Sweden) Royal Swedish Academy of Sciences	Nobel Prize in Physics	"For the invention of an apparatus to produce extremely high pressures, and for the discoveries he made therewith in the field of high pressure physics."	
1951	(United States) Society of Rheology	Bingham Medal	—	

=== Honorary degrees ===
Year	University	Degree	Ref.
1950	(United States) Princeton University	Doctor of Science	
1951	(United States) Yale University	Doctor of Science	

== Commemoration ==
The Percy W. Bridgman House, in Massachusetts, is a U.S. National Historic Landmark designated in 1975.

In 2014, the Commission on New Minerals, Nomenclature and Classification of the International Mineralogical Association approved the name bridgmanite for perovskite-structured (Mg,Fe)SiO_{3}, the Earth's most abundant mineral, in honor of his high-pressure research.

== Bibliography ==
- — (1922). Dimensional Analysis. New Haven: Yale University Press. OCLC 840631.
- — (1925). A Condensed Collection of Thermodynamics Formulas. Cambridge, Massachusetts: Harvard University Press. OCLC 594940689.
- — (1927). The Logic of Modern Physics. New York: Macmillan. OCLC 17522325. Online excerpt.
- — (1934). The Thermodynamics of Electrical Phenomena in Metals. New York: Macmillan.
- — (1936). The Nature of Physical Theory. Dover. OCLC 1298653.
- — (1938). The Intelligent Individual and Society. New York: MacMillan. OCLC 1488461.
- — (1941). The Nature of Thermodynamics. Cambridge, Massachusetts: Harvard University Press. ISBN 9780844605128. OCLC 4614803.
- — (1949). The Physics of High Pressure. London: G. Bell. OCLC 8122603.
- — (1950). Reflections of a Physicist. New York: Philosophical Library. OCLC 583047.
- — (1952). Studies in large plastic flow and fracture: with special emphasis on the effects of hydrostatic pressure. Metallurgy and metallurgical engineering series. New York: McGraw-Hill. OCLC 7435297.
- — (1959). The Way Things Are. Cambridge, Massachusetts: Harvard University Press. ISBN 9780674948303. OCLC 40803473.
- — (1961) [First published separately in 1925 and 1934]. Thermodynamics of Electrical Phenomena in Metals and a Condensed Collection of Thermodynamic Formulas. New Haven: Macmillan. OCLC 610252150.
- — (1962). A Sophisticate's Primer of Relativity. Middletown, Conn: Wesleyan University Press. OCLC 530615.
- — (1964). Collected experimental papers. Cambridge, Massachusetts: Harvard University Press. OCLC 372237.

== See also ==
- Bridgmanite, the most abundant mineral in Earth's mantle, named after Bridgman
- Bridgman's black
- Pascalization, also called bridgmanization
- Percy W. Bridgman House
- Phases of ice, discovery of high pressure forms of water was published by P.W. Bridgman in 1912

Academic offices
Preceded by Theodore Lyman	Hollis Chair of Mathematics and Natural Philosophy; 1926–1950	Succeeded by John Hasbrouck Van Vleck
