= Katharine Snodgrass =

American economist (1893–1930)

- Snodgrass as secretary of the senior class of Shortridge High School, 1910
- Born: May 9, 1893; Marion, Indiana, U.S.
- Died: September 25, 1930 (aged 37); Minneapolis, Minnesota, U.S.
- Education: Bryn Mawr College (BA); Columbia University (MA); Stanford University (PhD)
- Occupation: Economist
- Awards: Guggenheim Fellowship (1930)

Katharine Snodgrass (May 9, 1893 – September 25, 1930) was an American economist. She published the 1928 book Copra and Coconut Oil and was awarded a Guggenheim Fellowship in 1930, but died by suicide shortly after suddenly returning from her fellowship research trip.

== Biography ==
Snodgrass was born on May 9, 1893, in Marion, Indiana. After attending Shortridge High School, she obtained a BA at Bryn Mawr College in 1915 and a MA at Columbia University in 1918; both degrees were in economics.

Snodgrass lived in the West Village in New York City, and worked as a researcher at the State Charities Aid Association, the War Industries Board, and the Federal Reserve Board. She also worked as an associate editor for the New York Journal of Commerce in 1923. From 1924 to 1929, she worked as a research associate at the Food Research Institute of Stanford University, and obtained her doctorate during that time. At the FRI, she worked on her 1928 book Copra and Coconut Oil, centered on the economics of coconut oil. In 1930, she published Margarine as a Butter Substitute, a monograph about the history of the titular product and its associated industry, through Stanford University Press.

Two reviewers for Oil & Fat Industries—John E. Rutzler Jr. and A. P. L.—praised Snodgrass's Copra and Coconut Oil and Margarine as a Butter Substitute for having value for people interested in coconut products and margarine, respectively. In a 2024 Science History Institute article, Annabel Pinkney identified Snodgrass among several "Nobel Prize-less, yet impressive and deserving contributors to science", remarking that she "overcame humble rural beginnings and lack of opportunities due to her gender".

In 1930, Snodgrass was awarded a Guggenheim Fellowship "to make a study of the dietary fats of Northern Europe, with particular reference to the displacement of dairy fats by vegetable fats, being a study in the economics of food substitution". She went to England in September for that research, but returned to the United States later that month. She died by suicide on September 25, 1930, after falling from a fourth-floor room in the University of Minnesota Medical Center, where she was being treated for a nervous disease.

Snodgrass had a sister, Margaret Harding, who worked at the University of Minnesota.

== Works ==
- Copra and Coconut Oil (1928)
- Margarine as a Butter Substitute (1930) (Note: Reviews of this book:)
