= Mary Tarleton Knollenberg =

American sculptor

Mary Lightfoot Tarleton Knollenberg (June 9, 1904 – December 21, 1992) was an American sculptor.

Born in Great Neck, Long Island, Knollenberg was a student of Mahonri Young and Heinz Warneke, and received a Guggenheim Fellowship in 1933. She later married historian Bernard Knollenberg, and was stepmother to his son Walter. During her career she was a member of the National Association of Women Painters and Sculptors, the Sculptors Guild, and the American Art Congress. Later in life Knollenberg counted among her friends Walker Evans. She died in her sleep at her home in Chester, Connecticut. Her work was the subject of a 2014 retrospective at the Florence Griswold Museum. Her papers and journals, along with diaries of her artist-writer mother, Mary Livingston Tarleton née Plympton, are in the Sallie Bingham Center for Women's History and Culture at Duke University.
