= High-pressure torsion =

Metal processing method

High-pressure torsion (HPT) is a severe plastic deformation technique used to refine the microstructure or control crystal structure of materials by applying both high pressure and torsional strain. HPT involves compressing a material between two anvils under a pressure in the range of gigapascals while simultaneously rotating one of the anvils for usually a few turns to induce shear deformation. It was introduced in 1935 by P.W. Bridgman, who developed early methods to apply extreme strain under high pressures in material processing. This process is widely used in materials science to create ultrafine-grained and nanostructured metallic and non-metallic materials, engineer crystal lattice defects, control phase transformations, synthesize new materials or investigate mechanisms underlying some natural phenomena.

HPT leads to significant grain refinement, resulting in materials with enhanced mechanical properties such as increased tensile strength, and hardness. HPT also has applications in producing metals with enhanced superplasticity, improving the toughness of alloys, and creating materials with unique properties like high wear resistance. Researchers use HPT to study fundamental aspects of deformation and phase transition under extreme conditions. Additionally, HPT is being explored for potential applications in the biomedical and energy fields due to the enhancement of functional properties. Progress in HPT science and technology has opened new possibilities in the development of advanced materials with superior mechanical and functional properties.
