= Herbert Heaton =

Economic historian and educationist

- Born: 6 June 1890
- Died: 24 January 1973 (aged 82)

Herbert Heaton (6 June 1890 – 24 January 1973) was a British-born economic historian. He held posts at the University of Tasmania, Queen's University, Kingston, and the University of Minnesota, where he was head of the Department of History from 1954 until his retirement in 1958. Heaton was elected a member of the American Philosophical Society in 1945.

Born in Silsden, Yorkshire, England, the son of a blacksmith, Heaton was educated at the University of Leeds, the London School of Economics, and the University of Oxford.
