= Mary Aquinas Devlin =

American academic

- Born: January 27, 1891; Denver, Colorado, U.S.
- Died: May 14, 1966 (aged 75); Dubuque, Iowa, U.S.
- Occupation: Religious studies scholar

Academic background
- Education: Saint Clara College; University of Wisconsin–Madison; University of Chicago
- Thesis: The date of the C-version of Piers the Plowman (1925)

Academic work
- Discipline: Religious studies
- Sub-discipline: Thomas Brinton
- Institutions: Saint Clara College; Rosary College

Mary Aquinas Devlin OP (January 27, 1891 – May 14, 1966) was an American Dominican academic who was Professor of English at Rosary College from 1928 until her death. A Guggenheim Fellow, she was a scholar on medieval Bishop of Rochester Thomas Brinton.

== Biography ==
Devlin was born on January 27, 1891, in Denver, Colorado. She was the daughter of James and Ellen Devlin, both born in Wisconsin to Irish-born parents. In 1912, she received her BA at Saint Clara College. She later moved to Kenosha, Wisconsin, and she received her MA at University of Wisconsin–Madison in 1914 and worked as a teacher at Sacred Heart Academy (1912–14, 1915–18) and at St. Clara Female Academy (1918–21).

After briefly returning to Saint Clara College to work as an instructor in English (1921–1922), Devlin returned to the Midwest to work at Rosary College; there, she was Associate Professor of English until 1928, when she was promoted to Professor, serving until her death. She was also head of the College's Department of English some time in 1930. In 1925, while working at Rosary College, she received her PhD at the nearby University of Chicago. Her dissertation was titled The date of the C-version of Piers the Plowman.

In 1930, Devlin was appointed as a Guggenheim Fellow to spend twelve months in England studying Thomas Brinton's life and legacy and editing his sermons. She published two academic articles on Brinton's sermons. She was the editor of both of Camden Series volumes of The Sermons of Thomas Brinton, Bishop of Rochester, 1373-1389 (volumes 85 and 86), published in 1954.

Devlin died on May 14, 1966, in Dubuque, Iowa. Her mass was held at the Sinsinawa Motherhouse in Sinsinawa, Wisconsin, on May 17.
