= George Dillon (poet) =

American poet

- Born: November 12, 1906; Jacksonville, Florida, US
- Died: May 9, 1968 (aged 61)
- Education: University of Chicago (BA)
- Occupation: Editor
- Writing career
- Genre: Poetry
- Notable work: The Flowering Stone
- Notable awards: Pulitzer Prize for Poetry (1932); 1932 Guggenheim Fellowship

George Hill Dillon (November 12, 1906 – May 9, 1968) was an American editor and poet. He was awarded the Pulitzer Prize for Poetry in 1932 for The Flowering Stone.

Dillon was born in Jacksonville, Florida but he spent his childhood in Kentucky and the Mid-West. He graduated from The University of Chicago in 1927 with a degree in English. He was the editor for Poetry magazine from 1937 to 1949, during which time he also served in WWII as a member of the Signal Corps. Viewing, from the top of the Eiffel Tower, the German Army being driven from Paris, he signaled, in Morse, "Paris is Free".

Though included in several contemporary anthologies, Dillon's works are largely out of print. Today he is perhaps best known as one of the many lovers of Edna St. Vincent Millay, whom he met in 1928 at The University of Chicago where she was giving a reading. Dillon was the inspiration for Millay's epic 52-sonnet sequence Fatal Interview and they later collaborated on translations from Charles Baudelaire's Les Fleurs du Mal in 1936.

== Awards ==
- 1932 Guggenheim Fellowship
- 1932 Pulitzer Prize for Poetry, for The Flowering Stone

== Works ==
- Boy in the Wind, The Viking Press, 1927
- The Flowering Stone, The Viking press, 1931
- Flowers of Evil Charles Baudelaire, Translator George Dillon, Edna St. Vincent Millay, Harper & Brothers, 1936
- Three plays of Racine. University of Chicago Press, 1961

== Sources ==
- Author and Book Info.com
