= Friedrich Knollenberg =

German politician

Friedrich Knollenberg (German pronunciation: [ˈfʁiːdʁɪç ˈknɔlənˌbɛʁk]) (born 6 October 1878 in Neuenkirchen-Vörden - died 30 December 1950 in Neuenkirchen) was a German politician. He was a member of the Christian Democratic Union of Germany (CDU). He was appointed to the Ernannter Oldenburgischer Landtag (de), a commission established after WWII by the British military government to control the State of Oldenburg (de), a historic territory in the northwest of Germany that reached statehood in the Middle Ages. He served as a member from the first session, on January 30, 1946 until the last session, on November 6, 1946. Other states were also controlled by similar commissions at the time.
