= Vera Brown Holmes =

Canadian-American historian (1890–1980)

- Born: September 21, 1890; Fredericton, New Brunswick, Canada
- Died: November 19, 1980 (aged 90)
- Occupation: Historian
- Spouse: John Herbert Arkwright Holmes (m. 1936; died 1963)
- Awards: Guggenheim Fellow (1931)

Academic background
- Education: McGill University; Bryn Mawr College

Academic work
- Discipline: History of the Americas
- Institutions: Wilson College; Smith College

Vera Lee Brown Holmes (September 21, 1890 – November 19, 1980) was a Canadian-American historian. Born in Fredericton, New Brunswick, she got her PhD at Bryn Mawr College after a delay caused by World War I and worked as a professor at Smith College from 1924 until her retirement in 1958. A 1931 Guggenheim Fellow, she also wrote A History of the Americas, with its two volumes released in 1950 and 1965.

== Biography ==
Vera Lee Brown, the daughter of Anna Dorothea (née Scovil) and Frank Manson Brown, was born on September 21, 1890, in Fredericton, New Brunswick. She was educated at Netherwood School for Girls and McGill University, the latter of where she got her AB in 1912 and AM in 1913. She later moved to Bryn Mawr College and became a 1914 M. Carey Thomas European Fellow, before returning to McGill to work as a history lecturer from 1916 until 1920.

After shelving plans for a previous dissertation which had been delayed due to World War I, The Audiencia in Spanish America, after its associated existing research was destroyed in a 1917 fire and another work on the topic was published, she did another round of research on a different dissertation, and during the 1920–1921 academic year, she traveled to London for research at the British Museum and Public Record Office. In 1922, the dissertation granted her a PhD at Bryn Mawr and was published as a book, Anglo-Spanish Relations in America in the Closing Years of the Colonial Era (1763–1774).

After a brief stint as chairman of the Wilson College Department of History (1922–1923), she returned to Bryn Mawr to be the 1923–1924 Helene and Cecil Rubel Foundation Fellow. In 1924, she joined Smith College as assistant professor of history. She was promoted to associate professor in 1927 and professor in 1931, before retiring in 1958. She also served as chair of Smith's Department of History. After releasing the 1930 book Studies in the History of Spain in the Second Half of the Eighteenth Century, she wrote A History of the Americas, a two-volume book on the history of the Americas, with the volumes – From Discovery to Nationhood (1950) and From Nationhood to World Status (1965) – being released more than a decade apart.

In 1931, she was elected a Guggenheim Fellow for research on Spain–United Kingdom relations in the context of 18th-century colonialism. During her career in Smith, she started directing a history of the Americas course there in 1935. After she was granted professor emerita status, Smith awarded her a Sophia Smith Fellowship for her service to the college, as well as an honorary degree in 1960.

In 1936, she married John Herbert Arkwright Holmes, an English-born Anglican priest who served as dean of Christ Church Cathedral in Fredericton from 1932 until 1936 and as dean of divinity at University of King's College from 1936 until 1955. They were married until his death in 1963, and he had three children from a previous marriage.

Holmes died on November 19, 1980. Her archives are held in the Smith College Libraries. She is buried in Forest Hill Cemetery in Fredericton, New Brunswick.

== Works ==
- A History of the Americas
  - A History of the Americas: From Discovery to Nationhood (1950)
  - A History of the Americas: From Nationhood to World Status (1965)
