= Operationalization =

Part of the process of research design

An example of operationally defining personal space

In research design, especially in psychology, social sciences, life sciences and physics, operationalization (or operationalisation) is the definition of a method to measure a phenomenon despite the phenomenon being difficult to define. Operationalization thus provides a practical definition of a fuzzy concept so as to make it clearly distinguishable, measurable, and understandable by empirical observation. In a broader sense, it defines the extension of a concept—describing what is and is not an instance of that concept. For example, in medicine, the phenomenon of health might be operationalized by one or more indicators like body mass index or tobacco smoking. As another example, in visual processing the presence of a certain object in the environment could be inferred by measuring specific features of the light it reflects. In these examples, the phenomena are difficult to directly observe and measure because they are general/abstract (as in the example of health) or they are latent (as in the example of the object). Operationalization helps infer the existence, and some elements of the extension, of the phenomena of interest by means of some observable and measurable effects they have.

Sometimes multiple or competing alternative operationalizations for the same phenomenon are available. Repeating the analysis with one operationalization after the other can determine whether the results are affected by different operationalizations. This is called checking robustness. If the results are (substantially) unchanged, the results are said to be robust against certain alternative operationalizations of the checked variables.

The concept of operationalization was first presented by the British physicist Norman Robert Campbell in his Physics: The Elements (Cambridge, 1920). This concept spread to humanities and social sciences. It remains in use in physics.

== Theory ==
=== History ===
Operationalization is the scientific practice of operational definition, where even the most basic concepts are defined through the operations by which we measure them. The practice originated in the field of physics with the philosophy of science book The Logic of Modern Physics (1927), by Percy Williams Bridgman, whose methodological position is called "operationalism".

Bridgman wrote that in the theory of relativity a concept like "duration" can split into multiple different concepts. In refining a physical theory, it may be discovered that what was thought to be one concept is actually two or more distinct concepts. Bridgman proposed that if only operationally defined concepts are used, this will never happen.

Bridgman's theory was criticized because "length" is measured in various ways (e.g. it is impossible to use a measuring rod to measure the distance to the Moon), so "length" logically is not one concept but many, with some concepts requiring knowledge of geometry. Each concept is to be defined by the measuring operation used. So the criticism is that there are potentially infinite concepts, each defined by the methods that measured it, such as angle of sighting, day of the solar year, angular subtense of the moon, etc. which were gathered together, some astronomical observations taken over a period of thousands of years.

In the 1930s, Harvard experimental psychologist Edwin Boring and students Stanley Smith Stevens and Douglas McGregor, struggling with the methodological and epistemological problems of defining measurement of psychological phenomena, found a solution in reformulating psychological concepts operationally, as it had been proposed in the field of physics by Bridgman, their Harvard colleague. This resulted in a series of articles that were published by Stevens and McGregor from 1935, that were widely discussed in the field of psychology and led to the Symposium on operationism in 1945, to which Bridgman also contributed.

=== Operationalization ===
The practical 'operational definition' is generally understood as relating to the theoretical definitions that describe reality through the use of theory.

The importance of careful operationalization can perhaps be more clearly seen in the development of general relativity. Einstein discovered that there were two operational definitions of "mass" being used by scientists: inertial, defined by applying a force and observing the acceleration, from Newton's second law of motion; and gravitational, defined by putting the object on a scale or balance. Previously, no one had paid any attention to the different operations used because they always produced the same results, but the key insight of Einstein was to posit the principle of equivalence that the two operations would always produce the same result because they were equivalent at a deep level, and work out the implications of that assumption, which is the general theory of relativity. Thus, a breakthrough in science was achieved by disregarding different operational definitions of scientific measurements and realizing that they both described a single theoretical concept. Einstein's disagreement with the operationalist approach was criticized by Bridgman as follows: "Einstein did not carry over into his general relativity theory the lessons and insights he himself has taught us in his special theory." (p. 335).

== In the social sciences ==
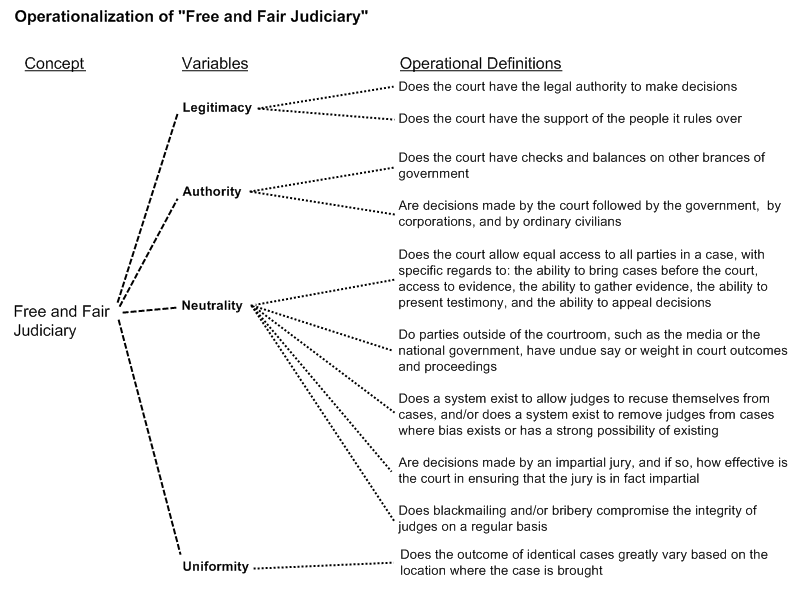
An operationalization diagram, used to illustrate obscure or ambiguous concepts in an academic paper. This particular example is tailored to use in the field of Political Science.

Operationalization is often used in the social sciences as part of the scientific method and psychometrics. Particular concerns about operationalization arise in cases that deal with complex concepts and complex stimuli (e.g., business research, software engineering) where unique threats to validity of operationalization are believed to exist. The steps in operationalization include identifying variables, defining measurement techniques, and developing operational definitions. Ensuring the validity and reliability of these measurements is crucial for accurate and reproducible research results.

=== Anger example ===
For example, a researcher may wish to measure the concept "anger." Its presence, and the depth of the emotion, cannot be directly measured by an outside observer because anger is intangible. Rather, other measures are used by outside observers, such as facial expression, choice of vocabulary, loudness and tone of voice.

If a researcher wants to measure the depth of "anger" in various persons, the most direct operation would be to ask them a question, such as "are you angry", or "how angry are you?". This operation is problematic, however, because it depends upon the definition of the individual. Some people might be subjected to a mild annoyance, and become slightly angry, but describe themselves as "extremely angry," whereas others might be subjected to a severe provocation, and become very angry, but describe themselves as "slightly angry." In addition, in many circumstances it is impractical to ask subjects whether they are angry.

Since one of the measures of anger is loudness, the researcher can operationalize the concept of anger by measuring how loudly subjects speak compared to their normal tones. However, this must assume that loudness is a uniform measure. Some might respond verbally while others might respond physically.

=== Economics objections ===
One of the main critics of operationalism in social science argues that "the original goal was to eliminate the subjective mentalistic concepts that had dominated earlier psychological theory and to replace them with a more operationally meaningful account of human behavior. But, as in economics, the supporters ultimately ended up "turning operationalism inside out". "Instead of replacing 'metaphysical' terms such as 'desire' and 'purpose'" they "used it to legitimize them by giving them operational definitions." Thus in psychology, as in economics, the initial, quite radical operationalist ideas eventually came to serve as little more than a "reassurance fetish" for mainstream methodological practice."

== Tying to conceptual frameworks ==
The above discussion links operationalization to measurement of concepts. Many scholars have worked to operationalize concepts like job satisfaction, prejudice, anger etc. Scale and index construction are forms of operationalization. There is not one perfect way to operationalize. For example, in the United States the concept distance driven would be operationalized as miles, whereas kilometers would be used in Europe.

Operationalization is part of the empirical research process. An example is the empirical research question of if job satisfaction influences job turnover. Both job satisfaction and job turnover need to be measured. The concepts and their relationship are important — operationalization occurs within a larger framework of concepts. When there is a large empirical research question or purpose the conceptual framework that organizes the response to the question must be operationalized before the data collection can begin. If a scholar constructs a questionnaire based on a conceptual framework, they have operationalized the framework. Most serious empirical research should involve operationalization that is transparent and linked to a conceptual framework.

Another example, the hypothesis Job satisfaction reduces job turnover is one way to connect (or frame) two concepts – job satisfaction and job turnover. The process of moving from the idea job satisfaction to the set of questionnaire items that form a job satisfaction scale is operationalization. For example, it is possible to measure job satisfaction using only two simple questions: "All in all, I am satisfied with my job", and, "In general, I like my job."

Operationalization uses a different logic when testing a formal (quantitative) hypothesis and testing working hypothesis (qualitative). For formal hypotheses the concepts are represented empirically (or operationalized) as numeric variables and tested using inferential statistics. Working hypotheses (particularly in the social and administrative sciences), however, are tested through evidence collection and the assessment of the evidence. The evidence is generally collected within the context of a case study. The researcher asks if the evidence is sufficient to "support" the working hypothesis. Formal operationalization would specify the kinds of evidence needed to support the hypothesis as well as evidence which would "fail" to support it. Robert Yin recommends developing a case study protocol as a way to specify the kinds of evidence needed during the data collection phases. He identifies six sources of evidence: documentation; archival records; interviews; direct observations; participant observation and physical or cultural artifacts.

In the field of public administration, Shields and Tajalli (2006) have identified five kinds of conceptual frameworks (working hypothesis, descriptive categories, practical ideal type, operations research, and formal hypothesis). They explain and illustrate how each of these conceptual frameworks can be operationalized. They also show how to make conceptualization and operationalization more concrete by demonstrating how to form conceptual framework tables that are tied to the literature and operationalization tables that lay out the specifics of how to operationalize the conceptual framework (measure the concepts).

== See also ==
- Proxy (statistics)
