= Herminio Portell Vilá =

Cuban writer and scholar

- Born: 1901; Cárdenas, Cuba
- Died: 1992 (aged 90–91); Miami, Florida
- Education: University of Havana
- Occupation: Writer

Herminio Portell Vilá (1901-1992) was a Cuban writer and scholar.

== Biography ==
Herminio Portell Vilá was born in Cárdenas, Cuba, in 1901 and died in Miami, Florida, in 1992. He earned a law degree at the University of Havana in 1927 and a degree in philosophy in 1934. He was a Guggenheim fellow from 1931–1933. He was professor of history and military history in Cuba, and during the 1930s he was a visiting professor at the University of California, Los Angeles; University of Florida; and at Black Mountain College. He also gave lectures at the University of Chicago, George Washington University, the National War College, the Inter-American Defense College, the U.S. Army War College, and the Foreign Service Institute in Washington D.C. Portell Vilá also served as the Latin American Radio Editor for the American Security Council (1967–1982) and writer/editor for The Voice of America and Radio Free Americas, which broadcasts information services to Latin America. As a writer, he wrote more than twenty books about Cuban history and published articles for several magazines such as Bohemia Libre. Even into his late eighties, Portell Vilá was participating in two daily radio programs on international affairs, publishing articles, and giving lectures around the country.

== Works or publications ==
- Bolívar y el panamericanismo. 1939. OCLC 6928676.
- Céspedes, el padre de la patria cubana. 1931. OCLC 345418.
- Clara Barton, Protector of the Cuban "Reconcentrados". 1954. OCLC 23683357.
- Cuba y la conferencia de Motevideo. 1934. OCLC 6558232.
- El "new deal" norteamericano. 1940. OCLC 7705083.
- El comandante Cazimajou, glorioso inválido del ejército libertador. 1950. OCLC 654993.
- Historia de Cuba en sus relaciones con los Estados Unidos y España. 1969. OCLC 4613467.
- Historia de la guerra de Cuba y los Estados Unidos contra España. 1949. OCLC 1898047.
- Informe documentado del primer quinquenio como profesor universitario (1939-1944). 1947. OCLC 4721099.
- Jorge Wáshington, Simón Bolívar; discursos de los dres. W.E. Klawans, Herminio Portell Vilá y Manuel Bisbé, pronunciados en las sesiones homenajes de los natalicios de los libertadores de América, celebrados respectivamente en 22 de febrero y 25 de julio de 1940, en la ciudad de la Habana, por la Socidad colombista panamericana. 1941. OCLC 5207575.
- La biblioteca y el libro cubanos como factor sociológico. 1934. OCLC 1872859.
- Los "otros extranjeros" en la Revolución Norteamericana. 1978. OCLC 5195619.
- Síntesis histórica de la vivienda popular. 2008. OCLC 435551715.
- Los periodistas norteamericanos y la independencia de Cuba. 1952. OCLC 1848797.
- Martí, diplomático. 1934. OCLC 9069801.
- Medio siglo de "El Mundo"; historia de un gran periódico. 1951. OCLC 1458334.
- Narciso López y su época. 1930–1958. OCLC 1900199.
- Nueva historia de la República de Cuba : (1898-1979). 1986. OCLC 18351103.
- Problemas de la nueva Cuba;. 1935. OCLC 3550452.
- The Non-intervention Pact of Montevideo and American Intervention in Cuba. 1935. OCLC 19082694.
- Vidas de la unidad americana, veinte y cinco biografías de americanos ilustres. 1944. OCLC 3511210.
