= Luke 15 =

- ← chapter 14 chapter 16 →
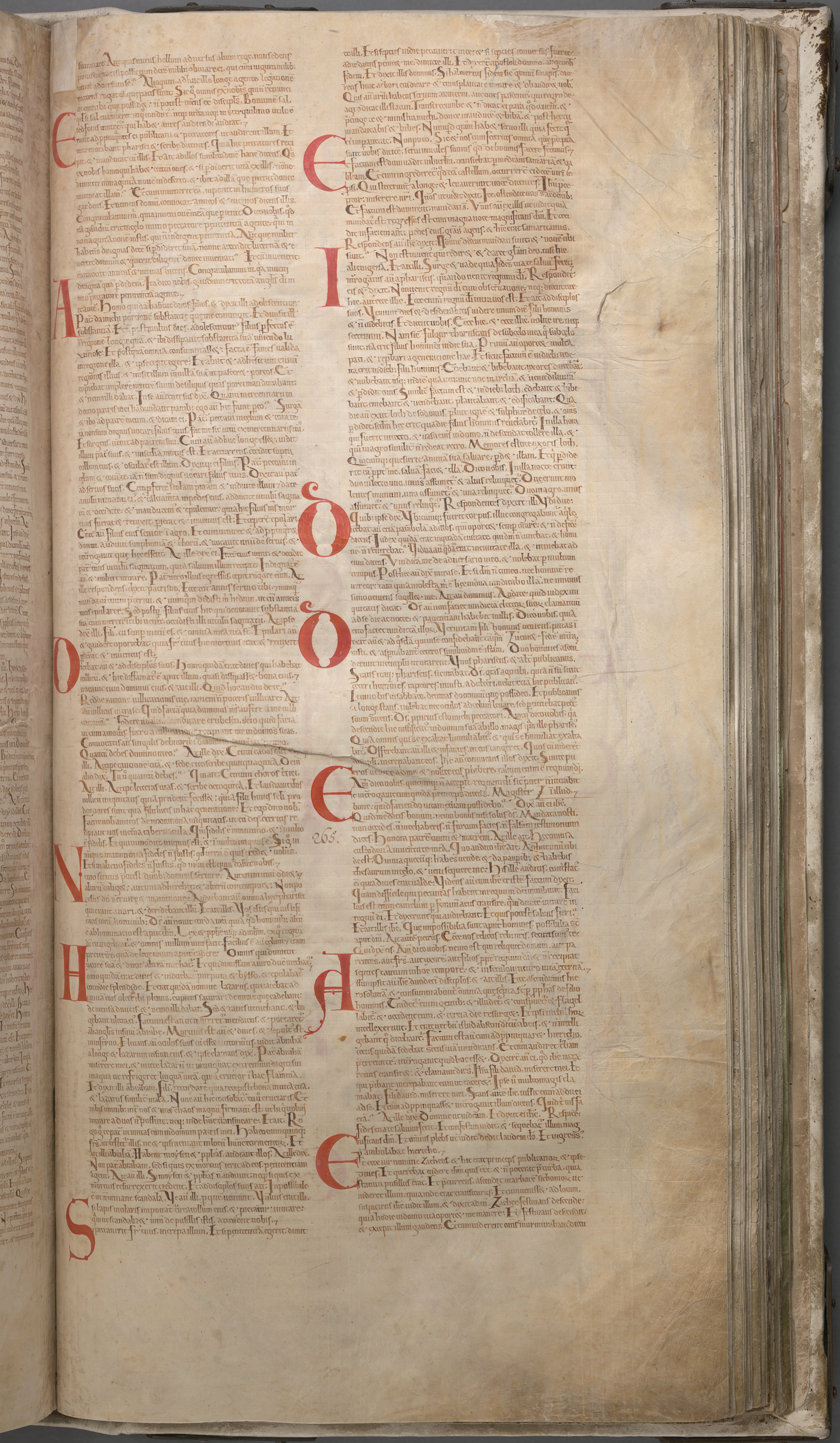
- The Latin text of Luke 14:30–19:7 in Codex Gigas (13th century)
- Book: Gospel of Luke
- Category: Gospel
- Christian Bible part: New Testament
- Order in the Christian part: 3

Luke 15 is the fifteenth chapter of the Gospel of Luke in the New Testament of the Christian Bible. Early Christian tradition uniformly affirmed that Luke the Evangelist composed this Gospel as well as the Acts of the Apostles. Critical opinion on the tradition was evenly divided at the end of the 20th century. This chapter records three parables of Jesus Christ: the lost sheep, the lost coin and the lost or 'prodigal' son, a trilogy about redemption that Jesus tells after the Pharisees and religious leaders accuse him of welcoming and eating with "sinners".

All three parables are devoted to mercy and all illustrate God's compassion. Biblical commentator Heinrich Meyer refers to this chapter, the following chapter and Luke 17:1–10 as a "new, important, and for the most part parabolic set of discourses" linked by the murmuring of the Pharisees and Jesus' responses to them and to his disciples. Arno Gaebelein notes that while these parables have wide appeal and application, in studying them "it must not be overlooked that the Lord answers in the first place the murmuring Pharisees".

== Text ==
The original text was written in Koine Greek. Some early manuscripts containing the text of this chapter are:

- Papyrus 75 (AD 175–225)
- Codex Vaticanus (325–350)
- Codex Sinaiticus (330–360)
- Codex Bezae (~400)
- Codex Washingtonianus (~400)
- Codex Alexandrinus (400–440).

This chapter is divided into 32 verses.

== Murmuring of the Pharisees and scribes ==
=== Verse 1 ===
Then all the tax collectors and the sinners drew near to Him to hear Him.

This is the third mention by Luke of the tax collectors (Greek: οι τελωναι, hoi telōnai, also translated as "publicans"); they were previously one of the groups who answered John the Baptist's call to repentance, and Jesus ate with them, amidst the Pharisees' earlier complaints, in chapter 5. Frederick Farrar suggests that "the sinners" refers in general to all "the degraded and outcast classes".

=== Verse 2 ===
And the Pharisees and scribes complained, saying,

"This Man receives sinners and eats with them."

Meyer compares the murmuring of the Pharisees and scribes (verses 1–2) with the murmurings of the Israelite community in the wilderness in Exodus 16:1–8 and 17:3. Eric Franklin suggests that in eating with them, "Jesus is anticipating their inclusion within the kingdom of God", and that the Pharisees' complaint about this was also raised later, in the early church, and "was in fact a subject of disagreement" in the early church.

== Parable of the Lost Sheep ==
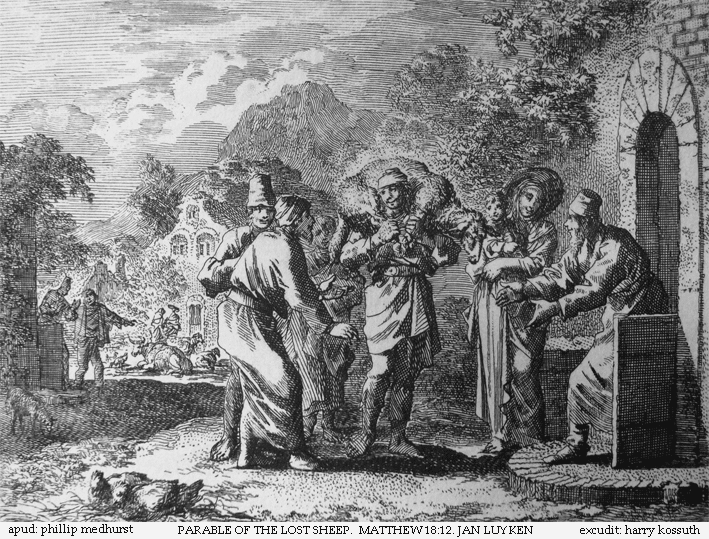
Etching by Jan Luyken showing the triumphant return of the shepherd, from the late 18th century Bowyer Bible

Verses 3–7 record this parable, which appears in two of the canonical gospels of the New Testament, as well as in the non-canonical Gospel of Thomas. According to the Gospels, a shepherd leaves his flock of ninety-nine sheep in order to find the one sheep who is lost. Compared with Matthew's version of this parable, Luke emphasises the shepherd's responsibility for the loss (verse 3: if he loses one of them; in Matthew, one of them goes astray), the unconditional nature of the search, and the joy which was brought about by the sinner's repentance.

=== Verse 7 ===
Just so, I tell you, there will be more joy in heaven over one sinner who repents than over ninety-nine righteous persons who need no repentance.

Farrar notes that "the Pharisees and scribes in an external sense were 'just persons', for as a class their lives were regular, though we learn from Josephus and the Talmud that many individuals among them were guilty of flagrant sins." The application of the term to them is ironic: the reality is that "they did need repentance but they did not want it".

== Parable of the Lost Coin ==
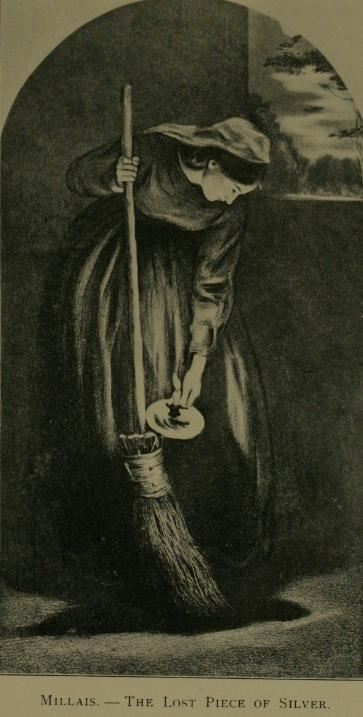
In this parable, a woman sweeps her dark house looking for a lost coin (engraving by John Everett Millais).

This parable, in verses 8–10, appears only Luke's Gospel. It recounts a story about a woman with ten silver coins (Greek drachmae) losing one. She then lights an oil lamp and sweeps her house until she finds it, rejoicing when she does. The New King James Version notes that married women often wore such coins in a ten-piece garland.

Franklin notes that in both of these stories, the primary narrative about God's search for the lost is supplemented by a comment on repentance (verses 7 and 10), which "appears to have been introduced, not because the movement of the parable itself required it, but because Luke was sensitive to the charge that emphasis upon the gracious outreach of God could underplay the necessity for response on the part of those it met."

== Parable of the Prodigal Son ==
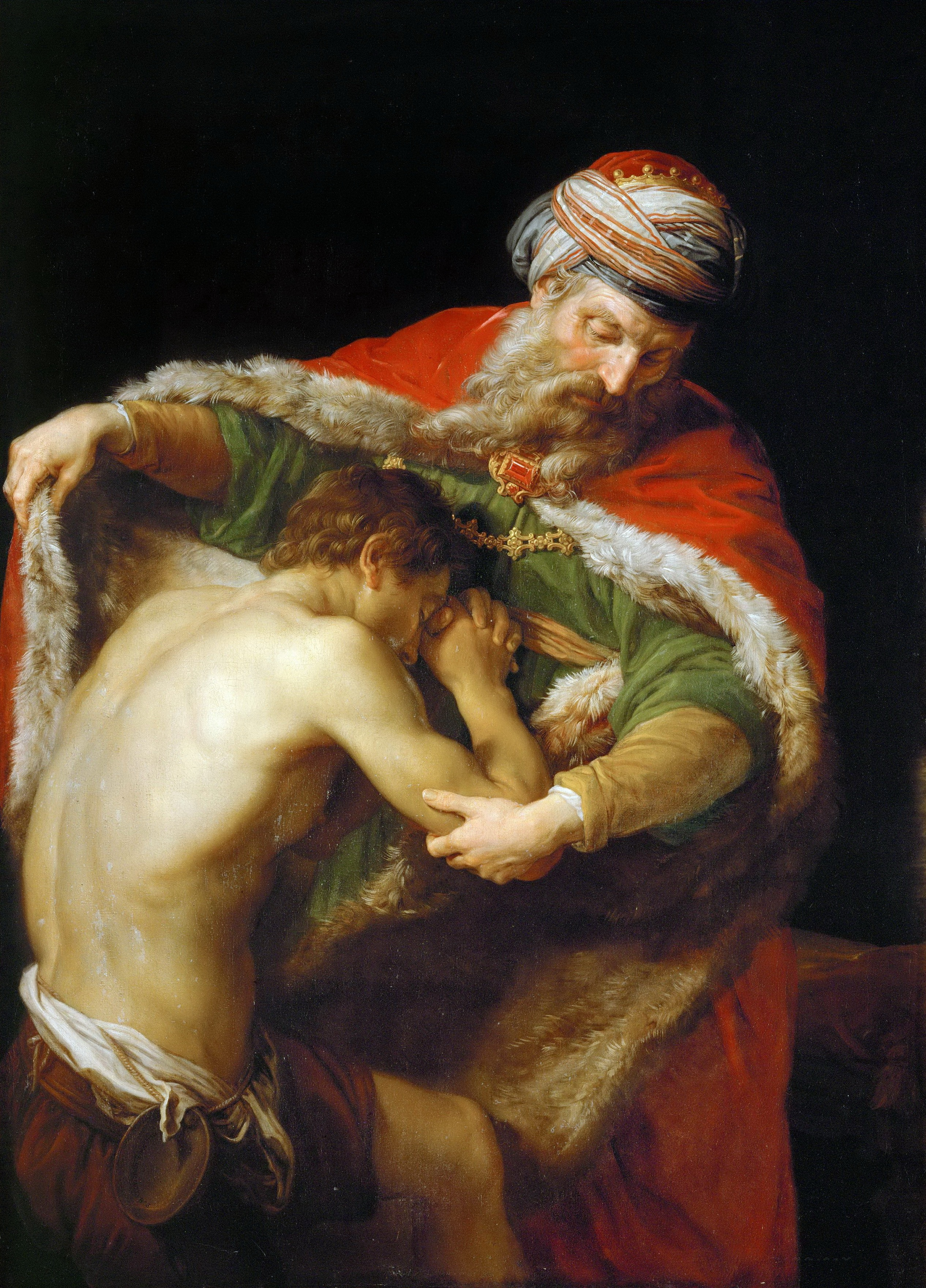
The Return of the Prodigal Son (1773) by Pompeo Batoni

The Prodigal Son, also known as Two Sons, Lost Son, the Prodigal Father, the Running Father, and the Loving Father, the third and final part of the cycle on redemption, also appears only in Luke's Gospel (verses 11–32). It tells of a father who gives the younger of his two sons his share of the inheritance before he dies. The younger son, after wasting his fortune (the word 'prodigal' means 'wastefully extravagant'), goes hungry during a famine. He then repents and returns home with the intention of begging to be employed and renouncing his kinship to his father. Regardless, the father immediately welcomes him back as his son and holds a feast to celebrate his return. The older son refuses to participate, stating that in all the time the son has worked for the father, he did not even give him a goat to celebrate with his friends. His father reminds the older son that everything the father has is the older son's, but that they should still celebrate the return of the younger son as he has come back to them.

=== Liturgical usage ===
In Western Catholic tradition, this parable is usually read on the fourth Sunday of Lent (in Year C), while in the Eastern Orthodox Church it is read on the Sunday of the Prodigal Son.

== See also ==
- Ministry of Jesus
- Parables of Jesus
- Related Bible parts: Matthew 18

Preceded by Luke 14	Chapters of the Bible; Gospel of Luke	Succeeded by Luke 16
