= Luke 16 =

- ← chapter 15 chapter 17 →
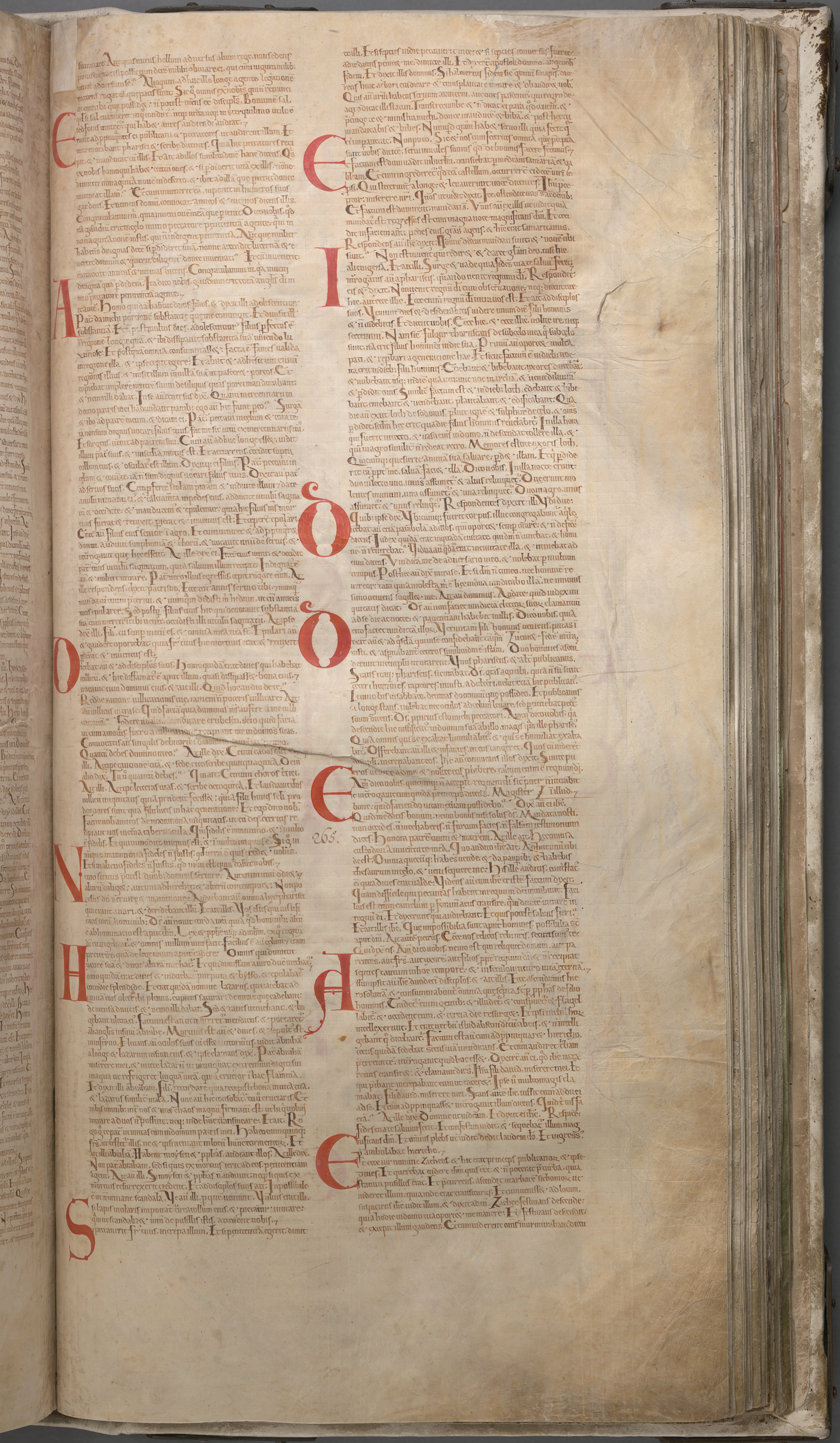
- The Latin text of Luke 14:30–19:7 in Codex Gigas (13th century)
- Book: Gospel of Luke
- Category: Gospel
- Christian Bible part: New Testament
- Order in the Christian part: 3

Luke 16 is the sixteenth chapter of the Gospel of Luke in the New Testament of the Christian Bible. It records the teachings and parables of Jesus Christ, including the account of the "rich man and Lazarus". There is an "overriding concern with riches" in this chapter, although other topics are also covered. Early Christian tradition uniformly affirmed that Luke the Evangelist composed this Gospel as well as the Acts of the Apostles. Critical opinion on the tradition was evenly divided at the end of the 20th century.

== Text ==
The original text was written in Koine Greek. Some early manuscripts containing the text of this chapter are:

- Papyrus 75 (AD 175–225)
- Codex Vaticanus (325–350)
- Codex Sinaiticus (330–360)
- Codex Bezae (~400)
- Codex Washingtonianus (~400)
- Codex Alexandrinus (400–440).

This chapter is divided into 31 verses.

== Parable of the unjust steward ==
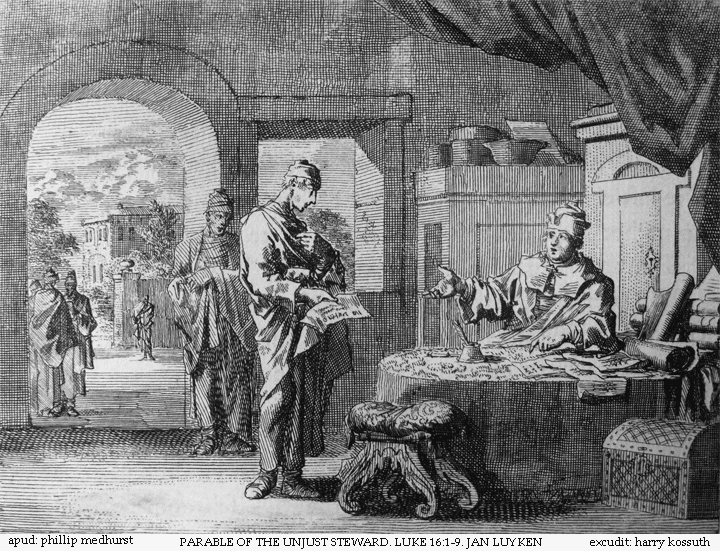
Jan Luyken etching of the parable of the unjust steward, Bowyer Bible

This parable of Jesus appears in Luke, but not in the other canonical gospels of the New Testament. Verse 1 affirms that the parable is for Jesus' disciples, and as far as verse 8a contains a story about a steward who is about to be dismissed, but who "curries favor" with his master's debtors by remitting some of their debts. The New International Version (NIV) calls this story "the parable of the shrewd manager", reflecting the wording of verse 8a where "the master commended the dishonest manager because he had acted shrewdly". According to Eric Franklin, this parable is "noteworthy for its obscurity". Harold Buls argues that, while this parable "has been called the most difficult of Jesus' parables, it is not so difficult if a person carefully studies the words".

The "certain rich man" who was about to dismiss his steward, is not identified. Friedrich Schleiermacher linked him with the Romans, and Christian Grossmann refers to a Roman emperor who dismissed a provincial governor. Heinrich Meyer also refers to a "usual explanation" that the rich man is God, but he is critical of all three of these interpretations.

== Verse 8b ==
For the people of this world are more shrewd in dealing with their own kind than are the people of the light.

This part-verse and the succeeding verses may be treated as part of the parable or as separate additions: translators and commentators vary in their assessment of where the parable ends, for example the New American Bible Revised Edition clearly begins its "application of the parable" at this point.

== Verse 9 ==
"And I say to you, make friends for yourselves by unrighteous mammon, that when you fail, they may receive you into an everlasting home."

"Unrighteous mammon" (Greek: του μαμωνα της αδικιας, tou mamōna tēs adikias) refers to wealth, or "money" in paraphrases such as that of J. B. Phillips, although the debts which had been written down in verses 6 and 7 had been expressed as debts payable in measures of oil and wheat.

== An encounter with the Pharisees ==
=== Verse 14 ===
Now the Pharisees, who were lovers of money, also heard all these things, and they derided Him.

The parable and the subsequent guidance were both directed to the disciples (see verse 1) but were also heard by the Pharisees, who were φιλάργυροι (philarguroi, either "lovers of money" or "covetous").

Johann Bengel suggests that along with their "covetous" nature, "they fancied themselves to be accomplished in (furnished with) such prudence as to be able admirably to combine the service of God and that of mammon", whereas the teaching of Jesus required "singleness of heart", a quality they also despised.

Anglican bishop Harvey Goodwin comments that the derision shown by the Pharisees confirms that they had been "touched by our Lord's teaching; they adopted the fool's course of mocking at that which they could not deny to be true, but whose truth they did not like to follow into its consequences".

=== Verse 16 ===
The law and the prophets [were] until John.

There is no verb in the original Greek: the word were is generally added to make sense of the sentence. The ISV says they were fulfilled with John. The NIV says they were proclaimed until John. Matthew's text says:

All the prophets and the law prophesied (ἐπροφήτευσαν, eprophēteusan) until John.

== Account of the Rich Man and Lazarus ==
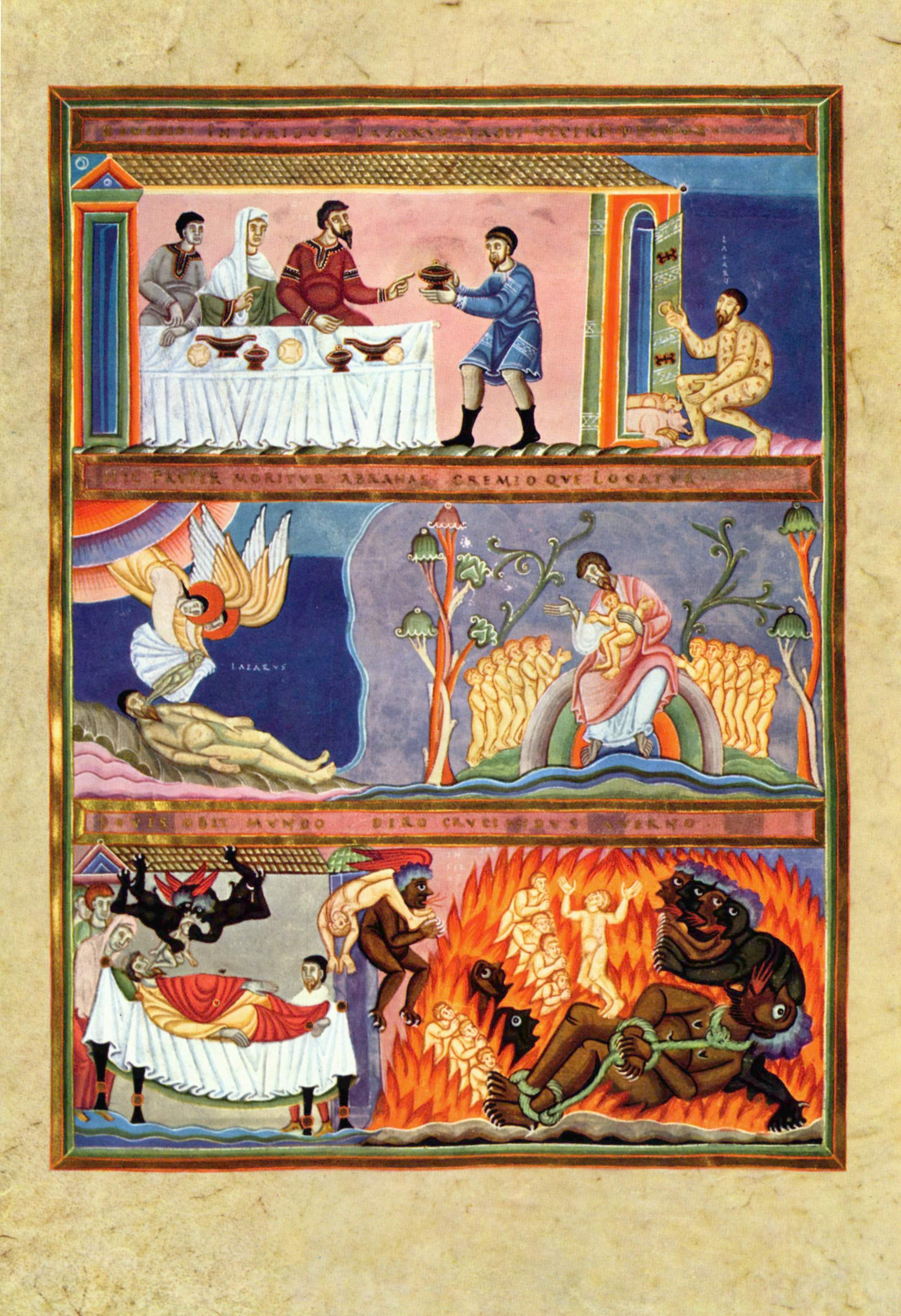
Lazarus and Dives, illumination from the Codex Aureus of Echternach Top panel: Lazarus at the rich man's door Middle panel: Lazarus' soul is carried to Paradise by two angels; Lazarus in Abraham's bosom Bottom panel: Dives' soul is carried off by two devils to Hell; Dives is tortured in Hades.

The account of the rich man and Lazarus (also called the Dives and Lazarus or Lazarus and Dives) is a well-known teachings along with the parables of Jesus appearing in the Gospel of Luke. It tells of the relationship, in life and in death, between an unnamed rich man and a poor beggar named Lazarus. The traditional name, Dives, is not actually a name, but instead a word for "rich man", dives, in the text of the Latin Bible, the Vulgate. The rich man was also given the names Neuēs (i.e. Nineveh) and Fineas (i.e. Phineas) in the 3rd and 4th centuries.

Along with the parables of the Ten Virgins, Prodigal Son, and Good Samaritan, it was one of the most frequently illustrated teachings in medieval art, perhaps because of its vivid account of an afterlife. Despite being labeled as a parable by some, there is no introduction in Luke's account to certify that it was just a parable.

The name Lazarus, from the Hebrew: אלעזר, Elʿāzār, Eleazar—"God is my help", also belongs to the more famous biblical character Lazarus of Bethany, known as "Lazarus of the Four Days", who is the subject of a prominent miracle attributed to Jesus in the Gospel of John, in which Jesus resurrects him four days after his death.

== See also ==
- Abraham
- Lazarus
- Ministry of Jesus
- Moses
- Parables of Jesus
- Other related Bible parts: Deuteronomy 1, Mark 10, Luke 4, Luke 24, Romans 7

Preceded by Luke 15	Chapters of the Bible; Gospel of Luke	Succeeded by Luke 17
