= Matthew 18 =

- ← chapter 17 chapter 19 →
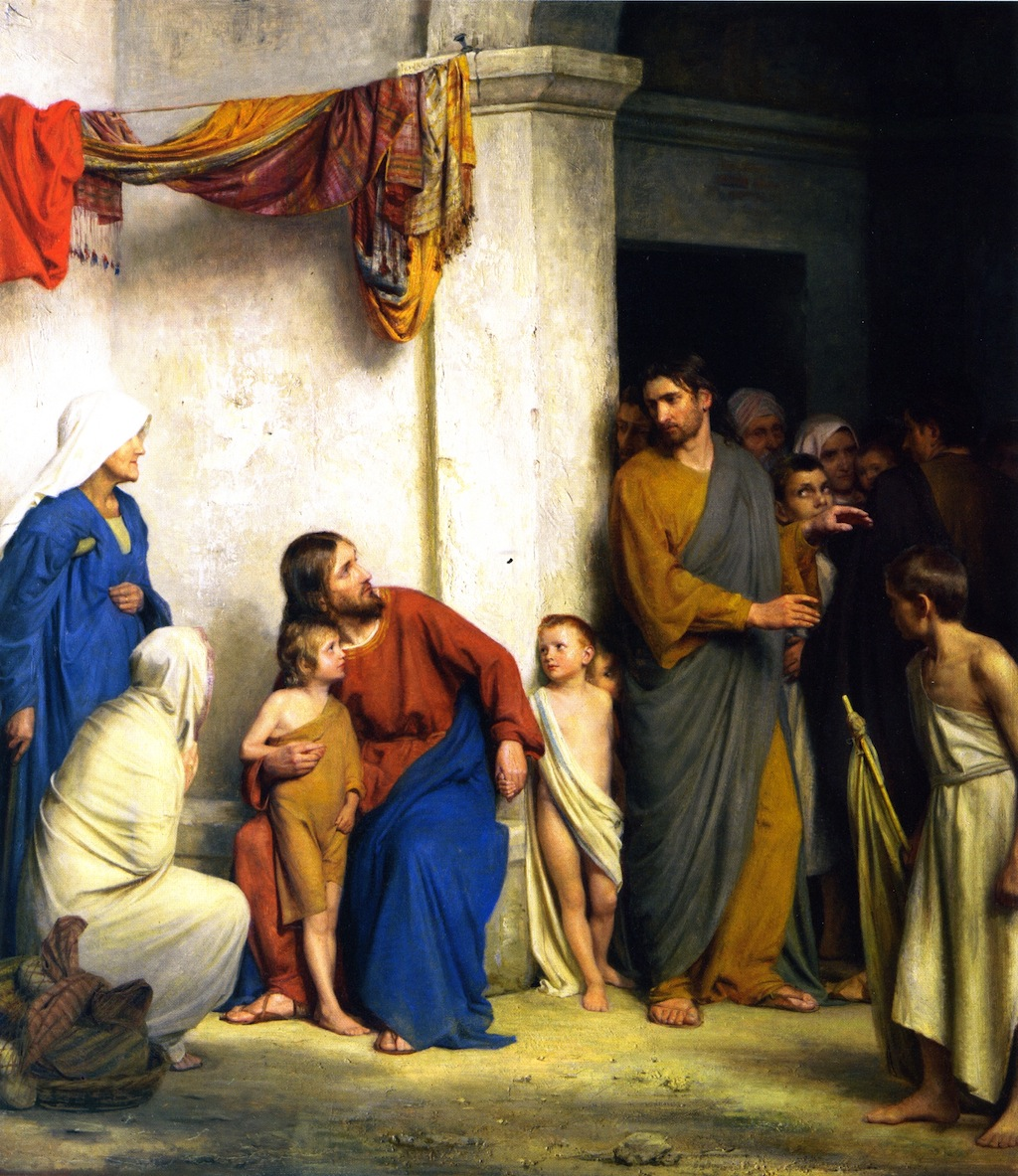
- Christ with children, by Carl Heinrich Bloch
- Book: Gospel of Matthew
- Category: Gospel
- Christian Bible part: New Testament
- Order in the Christian part: 1

Chapter 18 of the Gospel of Matthew contains the fourth of the five Discourses of Matthew, also called the Discourse on the Church or the ecclesiastical discourse. It compares "the greatest in the Kingdom of Heaven" to a child, and also includes the parables of the lost sheep and the unforgiving servant, the second of which also refers to the Kingdom of Heaven. The general themes of the discourse are the anticipation of a future community of followers, and the role and "spiritual condition" of his apostles in leading it.

Dale Allison states that this chapter offers "Instructions for the Church". Addressing his apostles in Matthew 18:18, Jesus states: "what things soever ye shall bind on earth shall be bound in heaven; and what things soever ye shall loose on earth shall be loosed in heaven". (Note: See also Binding and loosing) The discourse emphasizes the importance of humility and self-sacrifice as the high virtues within the anticipated community. It teaches that in the Kingdom of God, it is childlike humility that matters, not social prominence and clout.

== Structure ==
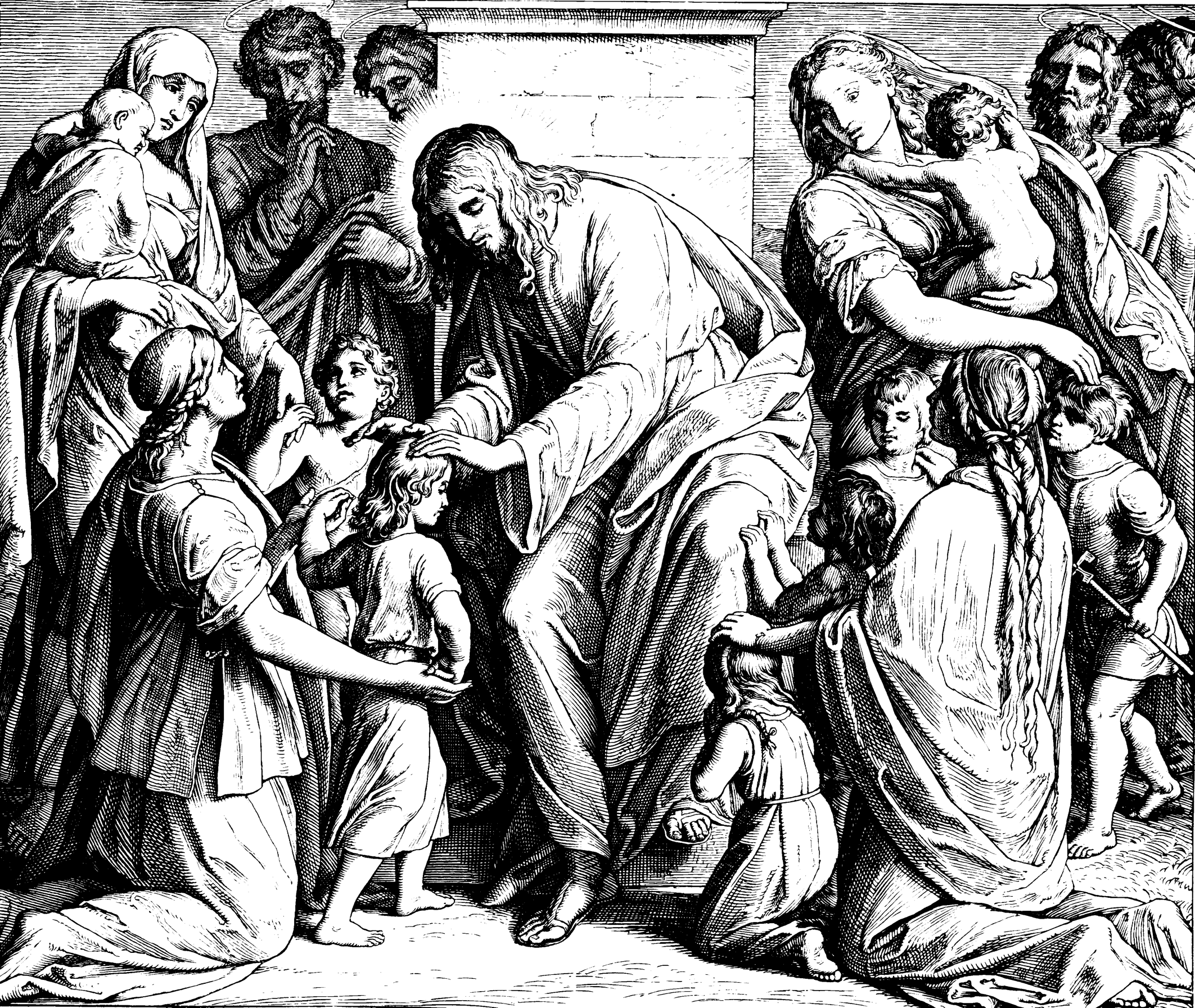
"Jesus teaches about greatness" by Julius Schnorr von Karolsfeld, 1860

The chapter can be divided into the following subsections:

- The Little Children (18:1–5)
- Jesus warns of offences (18:6–7)
- If thy hand offend thee (18:8–9)
- Parable of the Lost Sheep (18:10–14)
- Binding and loosing (18:15–18)
- Prayer in common (18:19–20)
- Parable of the unforgiving servant (18:21–35)

== Text ==
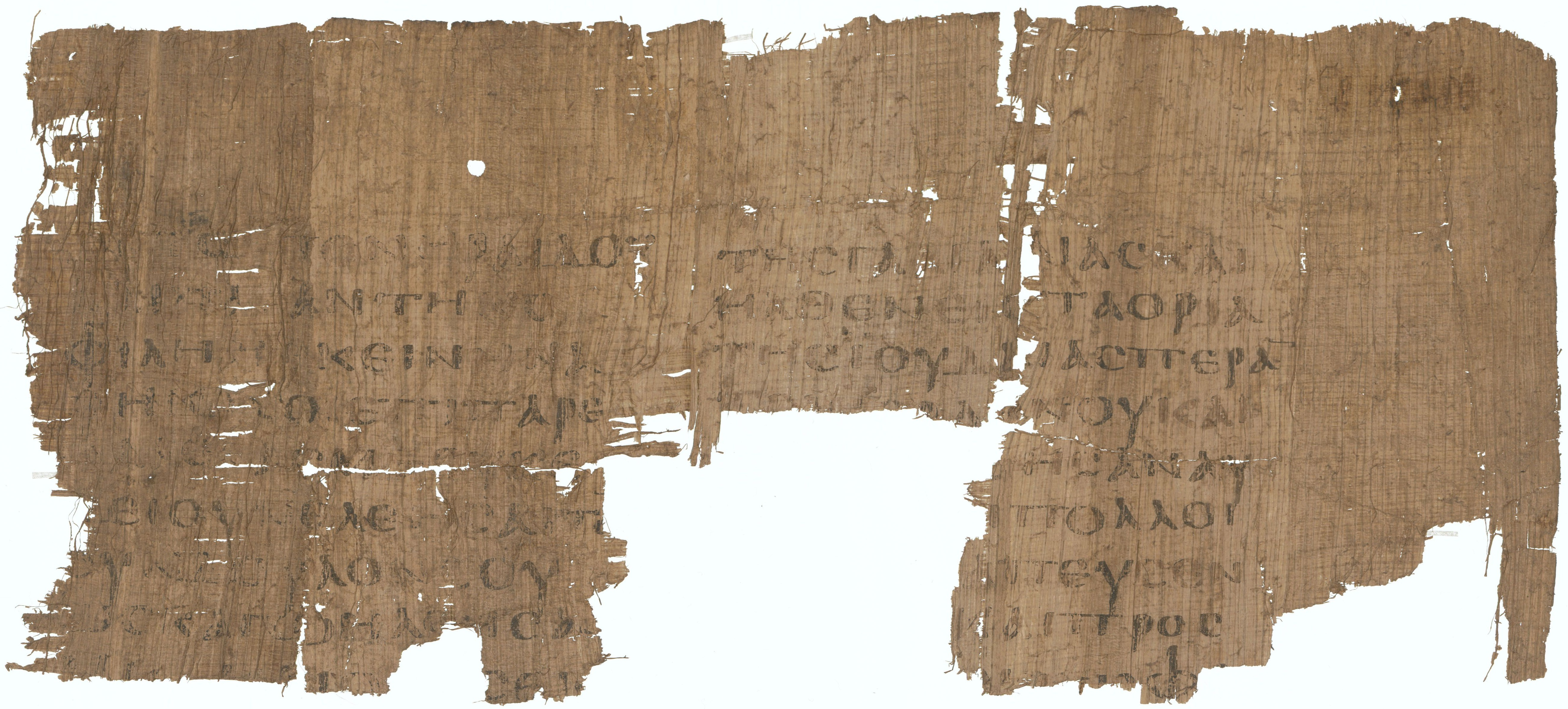
Matthew 18:32–34; 19:1–3,5–7,9–10 on the recto side of Papyrus 25 from 4th century

The original text was written in Koine Greek. This chapter is divided into 35 verses.

=== Textual witnesses ===
Some early manuscripts containing the text of this chapter are:

- Papyrus 25 (4th century; extant verses 32–34)
- Codex Vaticanus (325–350)
- Codex Sinaiticus (330–360)
- Codex Bezae (~400)
- Codex Washingtonianus (~400)
- Codex Ephraemi Rescriptus (~450)
- Codex Purpureus Rossanensis (6th century)
- Codex Petropolitanus Purpureus (6th century; extant verses 6–25)
- Codex Sinopensis (6th century; extant verses 4–30)
- Papyrus 44 (6th/7th century; extant verses 15–17, 19)

== Receiving believers (18:1–11) ==
=== Verse 1 ===
At that time the disciples came to Jesus, saying, "Who is the greatest in the kingdom of heaven?

The expression "at that time" or "in that hour" "connects what follows very closely with the tax incident (Matthew 17:24–27), and shows that the two things were intimately associated in the mind of the evangelist".

=== Verse 3 ===
"Assuredly, I say to you, unless you are converted and become as little children, you will by no means enter the kingdom of heaven."

"Be converted" is more literally translated as "be turned… so as to go in an opposite direction". The phrase "enter the kingdom of heaven" appears three other times in the Gospel, at Matthew 5:20, 7:21, and 23:13.

=== Verse 6 ===
“But whoever causes one of these little ones who believe in Me to sin, it would be better for him if a millstone were hung around his neck, and he were drowned in the depth of the sea."

This verse is Jesus' warning about causing other people, particularly children ("one of these little ones"), to sin. The imagery of a millstone around one's neck serves to highlight the severity of the sin of promoting sin or encouraging others to sin. The fact that Jesus states that "it would be better" to have such a heavy thing around one's neck and fall into the waters of the sea than to commit a deed shows how serious the act of leading someone astray is.

=== Verse 7 ===
"Woe to the world because of offenses! For offenses must come, but woe to that man by whom the offense comes!

Woe to the world (Greek: οὐαὶ τῶ κόσμῳ, Ouai tō kosmō).

In Matthew 18:7, Jesus utters "an exclamation of pity at thought of the miseries that come upon mankind through ambitious passions".

=== Verse 11 ===
ηλθεν γαρ ο υιος του ανθρωπου σωσαι το απολωλος
For the Son of Man has come to save that which was lost.

Verse 11 is present in some ancient texts but not in others. It appears in the Textus Receptus, and the King James Version includes it, but the New International Version omits it and the omission in the NU text is noted in a footnote in the New King James Version.

== The local church (18:12–35) ==
Commentator John Philips looks at this chapter in relation to the local church or community of believers.

=== Restoring backsliders (18:12–14) ===
The threefold function of a local church is not only to receive new believers into its midst (cf. 18:1–11), but also to restore of backsliders and to reconcile brethren (18:15–35). The restoration of backsliders is illustrated by Jesus in a story of the lost sheep and the loving shepherd, which is more fully told and elaborated into a three-part story in Luke 15 concerning a lost sheep, a lost piece of silver, and a lost son.

=== Reconciling brethren (18:15–35) ===
The third of the threefold functions of a local church (after receiving new believers in 18:1–11 and restoring backsliders in 18:12–14) is to reconcile brethren. Allison observes that "as soon as [Jesus] finishes the subject of disciplinary measures, he talks about reconciliation and forgiveness. The pastoral effect is to strike a balance".

Jesus teaches that the attempt to reconcile a brother involves three steps: the Christian Love Rules (18:15), the Common Law Rules (18:16) and the Christian Leaders Rule (18:17–20), which is followed by an exposition of forgiveness (18:21–22) accompanied by a parable about a man whose debt is forgiven but refused to forgive others and therefore is punished (18:23–35).

Verses 15–17 are of particular significance to Baptists in their support of the principle of autonomy of the local church. (Note: See Baptist beliefs)

==== Verse 17 ====
And if he refuses to hear them, tell it to the church. But if he refuses even to hear the church, let him be to you like a heathen and a tax collector.

If a sinner remains recalcitrant, even after the matter is raised privately and then brought to the whole community, then the person must be regarded as "outside the community", i.e. "excommunicated". Verna Holyhead notes that gentiles (heathen) and tax collectors are on the religious and social margins in Matthew's Gospel, yet they are befriended by Jesus, so the mandate in this verse is not to be understood as a complete severance of all relationships.

==== Verse 18 ====
Truly I say to you, whatever you bind on earth will be bound in heaven, and whatever you loose on earth will be loosed in heaven.

Cross reference: Matthew 16:19, John 20:23

==== Verse 19 ====
Again I say to you that if two of you agree on earth concerning anything that they ask, it will be done for them by My Father in heaven.

This verse opens with "Again, truly ..." in the New International Version, drawing on the inclusion of Greek: ἀμὴν, amēn, in some manuscripts.

Henry Alford links this verse with Mark 10:35, where James and John "nearly repeat these words", but without properly understanding them: "Teacher", they said, "we want you to do for us whatever we ask".

== See also ==
- Parables of Jesus
- Related Bible parts: Mark 9, Luke 9, Luke 15, Luke 17
