= The Prodigal =

1955 film

- Film poster
- Directed by: Richard Thorpe
- Written by: Maurice Zimm adaptation Joe Breen Jr. Samuel James Larsen
- Based on: Parable of the Prodigal Son in Luke 15:11-32 of the Bible (uncredited)
- Produced by: Charles Schnee
- Starring: Lana Turner; Edmund Purdom; James Mitchell; Louis Calhern; Joseph Wiseman
- Cinematography: Joseph Ruttenberg
- Edited by: Harold F. Kress
- Music by: Bronislau Kaper
- Production company: MGM
- Distributed by: MGM
- Release date: May 6, 1955
- Running time: 112 minutes
- Country: United States
- Language: English
- Budget: $2,783,000
- Box office: $4,143,000

The Prodigal is a 1955 Eastmancolor biblical epic CinemaScope film made by MGM starring Lana Turner and Edmund Purdom. It was based on the New Testament parable about a selfish son who leaves his family to pursue a life of pleasure. The film also features James Mitchell, Louis Calhern, Joseph Wiseman, Cecil Kellaway, Audrey Dalton, and Walter Hampden. Dancer Taina Elg made her film debut in The Prodigal.

== Plot ==
In the times before Christianity, only a few people believed in one God. Most people believed in many gods. It was mainly the believers in Jehovah who stood against a multitude of some 65,000 strange and different gods. Of these, two of the most notorious were Baal and Astarte, the male and the female. Gods of the flesh, not of the soul. They were supposed to renew the fertility of the earth every year. In exchange, they demanded of their believers the sacrifice of money, jewelry and human life. Out of these times comes our story, based upon the Parable of the Prodigal Son as told in Luke, Chapter 15.

The story is loosely based on Jesus Christ's parable of the prodigal son, from the Gospel According to Luke 15:11-32, although considerable liberties are taken with the source material, chief among them being the addition of a female lead in the form of the high priestess of Astarte, Samarra.

Micah, a young Hebrew farm boy, sees Samarra and says he will have her. He demands that his father give him his inheritance and journeys to the city of Damascus. There Samarra seduces him into losing his inheritance and betraying his religious faith. Enduring a number of difficulties, Micah finally realizes where he belongs and returns home to his father, who forgives Micah all of his sins and orders a lavish celebration of his return.

== Cast ==
- Lana Turner as Samarra
- Edmund Purdom as Micah
- Louis Calhern as Nahreeb
- Audrey Dalton as Ruth
- James Mitchell as Asham
- Neville Brand as Rhakim
- Walter Hampden as Eli
- Taina Elg as Elissa
- Francis L. Sullivan as Bosra
- Joseph Wiseman as Carmish
- Sandy Descher as Yasmin
- John Dehner as Joram
- George Sawaya as Kavak
- Cecil Kellaway as the Governor
- Gordon Richards as Nahreeb's Scribe

== Production ==
In the 1950s films with Biblical themes were very popular. Two friends, Sam Larson and Joseph Breen Jr., became interested in the cinematic possibilities of the famous parable. Larson had muscular dystrophy and thought the story had resonance to the problems of young people today; he was also interested in the setting of Damascus and Joppa in 70 BC, which had been seen on screen rarely. Larson and Breen wrote a 60-page treatment. They took it to Dore Schary, head of production at MGM, who was interested. He assigned Charles Schnee to produce and Maurice Zimm to write a script.

The film was originally to star Edmund Purdom, Ava Gardner and Vittorio Gassman. Maurice Zimm's script was based on the original parable but was technically an original work. It was set in Syria and Palestine in 79 BC. Eventually Gardner and Grassman dropped out.

Dore Schary later said he "hustled Lana Turner into playing it" and "the sorry fact is I liked the script. I thought it would draw an audience. What I forgot was that C.B. De Mille had an exclusive on the Bible. Poor Lana swayed her way through the film but it was a hopeless task. The script was lifeless."

Schary says after two weeks filming "I saw we were in quicksand" and asked the MGM production office to calculate the cost if the studio abandoned the film. Since the sets had been built, costumes designed and contracts signed (over $200,000 was spent on costumes) the studio would have incurred a loss of $1.2 million. Schary decided to finish the picture on an accelerated schedule instead "and hoped that we wouldn't fare too badly".

== Reception ==
According to MGM records the film earned $2,153,000 in the US and Canada and $1,990,000 elsewhere, resulting in a loss of $771,000.

Dore Schary later called the film "the biggest and most embarrassing failure" and "the worst film I ever supported" in his time at MGM.

The Prodigal was satirized in Mad #26 (November 1955) as The Prodigious.

== See also ==
- List of American films of 1955
