= Matthew 19 =

- ← chapter 18 chapter 20 →
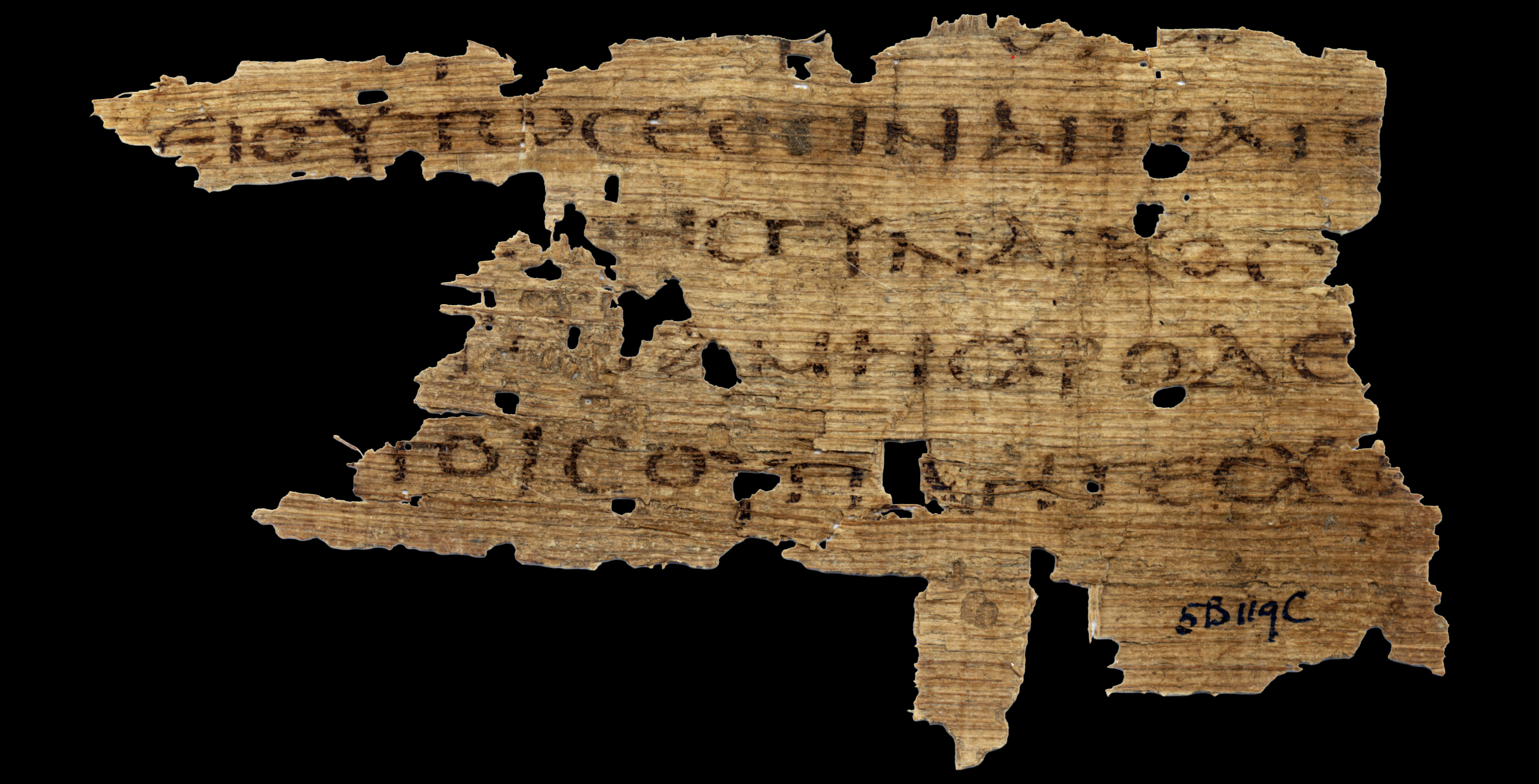
- Matthew 19:10–11 on the recto side of Papyrus 71, written c. AD 350
- Book: Gospel of Matthew
- Category: Gospel
- Christian Bible part: New Testament
- Order in the Christian part: 1

Matthew 19 is the nineteenth chapter in the Gospel of Matthew in the New Testament section of the Christian Bible. Early Christian tradition attributed the book to Matthew. Jesus commences his final journey to Jerusalem in this chapter, ministering through Perea. It can be seen as the starting point for the passion narrative. The opening words resemble preceding statements in Matthew 7:28, 11:1, and 13:53.

== Text ==
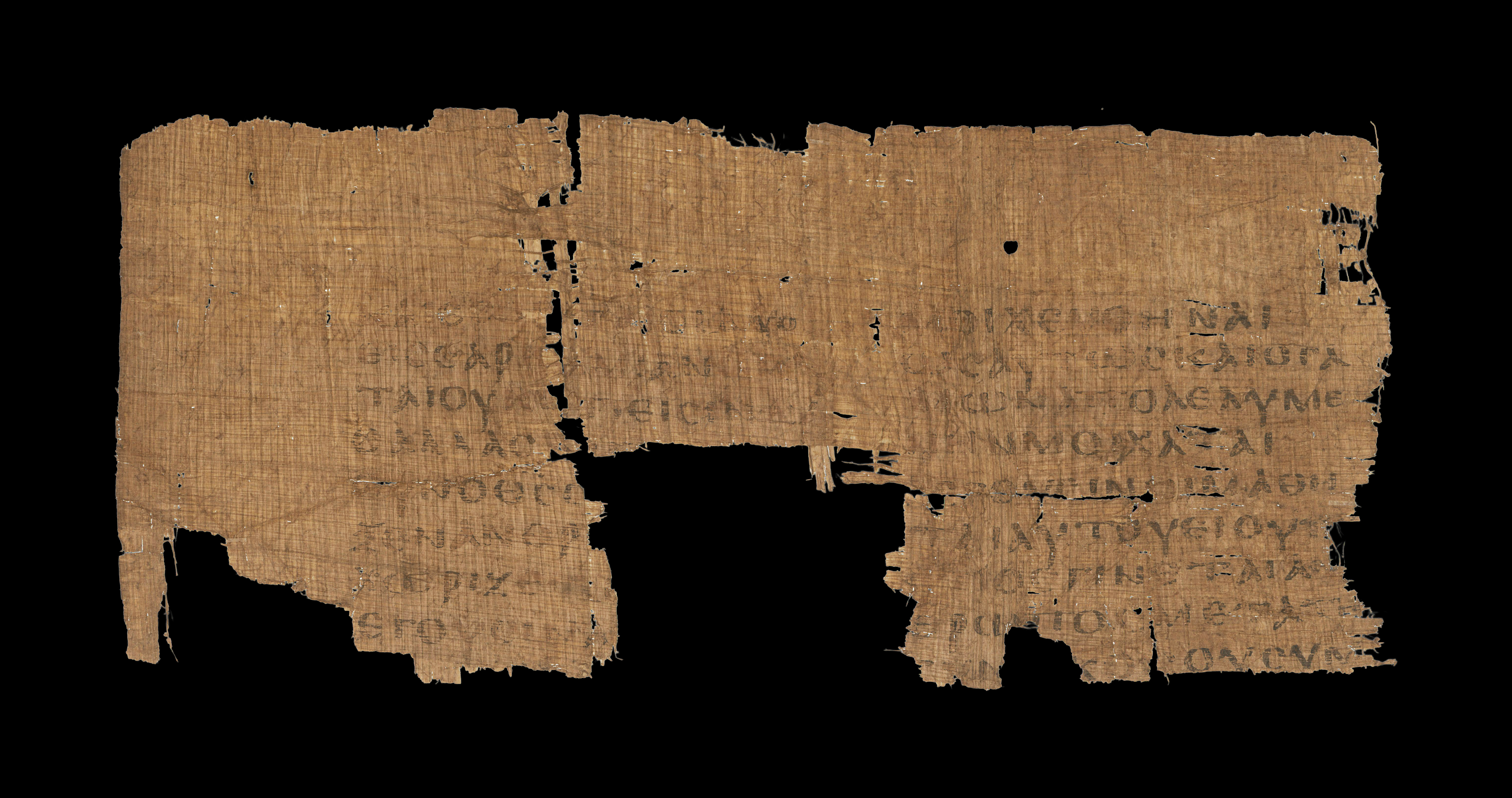
Matthew 19:5–7,9–10 on the verso side of Papyrus 25 from 4th century

The original text was written in Koine Greek. This chapter is divided into 30 verses.

=== Textual witnesses ===
Some early manuscripts containing the text of this chapter are:

- Papyrus 25 (4th century; extant: verses 1–3, 5–7, 9–10)
- Codex Vaticanus (AD 325–50)
- Codex Sinaiticus (330–60)
- Papyrus 71 (c. 350)
- Codex Bezae (c. 400)
- Codex Washingtonianus (c. 400)
- Codex Ephraemi Rescriptus (c. 450)
- Codex Purpureus Rossanensis (6th century)
- Codex Petropolitanus Purpureus (6th century; extant: verses 7–12)
- Codex Sinopensis (6th century; extant: verses 3–10, 17–25)

== Locations ==
The events recorded in this chapter took place in Galilee and Judea beyond the Jordan (Perea), before Jesus and his party later enter Jericho, on their way to Jerusalem. Jesus leaves Galilee at this stage in Matthew's narrative (Matthew 19:1): the Jamieson-Fausset-Brown Bible Commentary reflects that "few readers probably note it as the Redeemer's Farewell to Galilee". He does not return there until after his resurrection from the dead. Subsequently, the announcement of the angels that Jesus has risen (Matthew 28:7), Jesus' own greeting to the women who meet him (Matthew 28:10) and the final words of Matthew's gospel, the final appearance of Jesus and his commission to "make disciples of all the nations" (Matthew 28:19) all refer back to the Galilee, which Jesus leaves at this time.

In Matthew 19:15, after blessing the little children, Jesus "departed from there", but no indication is given of where he went. The Jerusalem Bible renders this text as "[Jesus] went on his way". The writer of the Pulpit Commentary confidently asserts that at this point Jesus "set out from Peraea, journeying towards Jerusalem", and theologian John Gill agrees with this interpretation. In Matthew 19:22 the rich young man "went away" from his encounter with Jesus, leaving Jesus to speak with his disciples about the difficulty faced by "a rich man [wishing] to enter the kingdom of heaven".

== Verse 1 ==
When Jesus had finished saying these things, he left Galilee and went to the region of Judea beyond the Jordan.

The Greek: και εγενετο οτε ετελεσεν ο ιησους τους λογους τουτους (kai egeneto ote etelesen o Iēsous tous logous toutous) contains a formula which Matthew has already used several times: in Matthew 7:28, 11:1 (when Jesus had finished instructing his twelve disciples) and 13:53 (when Jesus had finished these parables). Eduard Schweizer treats the formula as a section divider. The opening words (19:1-2) resemble preceding statements in Matthew 7:28, 11:1, and 13:53.

== Verse 2 ==
And great multitudes followed Him, and He healed them there.

Johann Bengel notes that "there" is not specific: it refers to many places where cures were performed.

== Verse 3 ==
Some Pharisees came to him to test him. They asked, "Is it lawful for a man to divorce his wife for any and every reason?"

In the Textus Receptus, the sentence refers to Greek: οι φαρισαιοι, (the Pharisees) but the word 'the' (οι) is excluded from later critical editions, hence many translations speak of "some" Pharisees. Jesus' teaching on divorce has already been set out in the Sermon on the Mount, but here the teaching is further elucidated. The conversation concerning divorce and marriage given in Mark 10:1ff. is, on the whole, set out in "a more original shape".

== Verse 10 ==
His disciples said to Him, "If such is the case of the man with his wife, it is better not to marry".

The Greek: οὐ συμφέρει γαμῆσαι (ou sympherei gamēsai) may be translated as "it is better not to marry" or "it is not better to marry". Arthur Carr, in the Cambridge Bible for Schools and Colleges, describes Jesus' ruling as "a revolution in thought brought to pass by Christ".

== Verses 16–24 ==
If you want to be perfect, go, sell your possessions and give to the poor, and you will have treasure in heaven. Then come, follow me.

These verses convey the episode of Jesus and the rich young man, concluding with "it is easier for a camel to go through the eye of a needle than for the rich to enter into the Kingdom of Heaven".

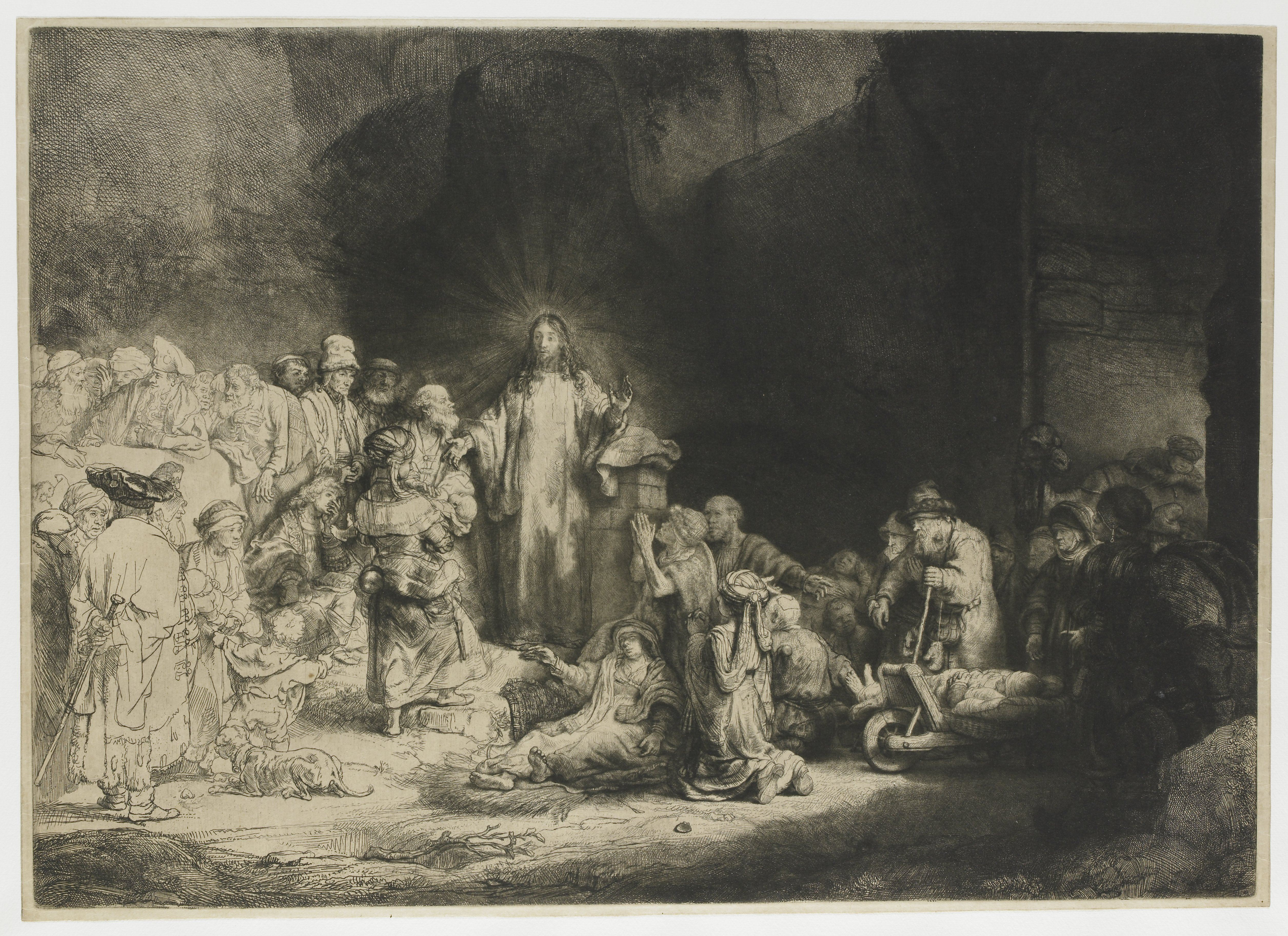
Rembrandt's Hundred Guilder Print depicting various events recorded in Matthew 19. 1649.

== Arts ==
The events of this chapter are combined in Rembrandt's Hundred Guilder Print.
