= Papyrus 25 =

Papyrus 𝔓^{25}
- New Testament manuscript
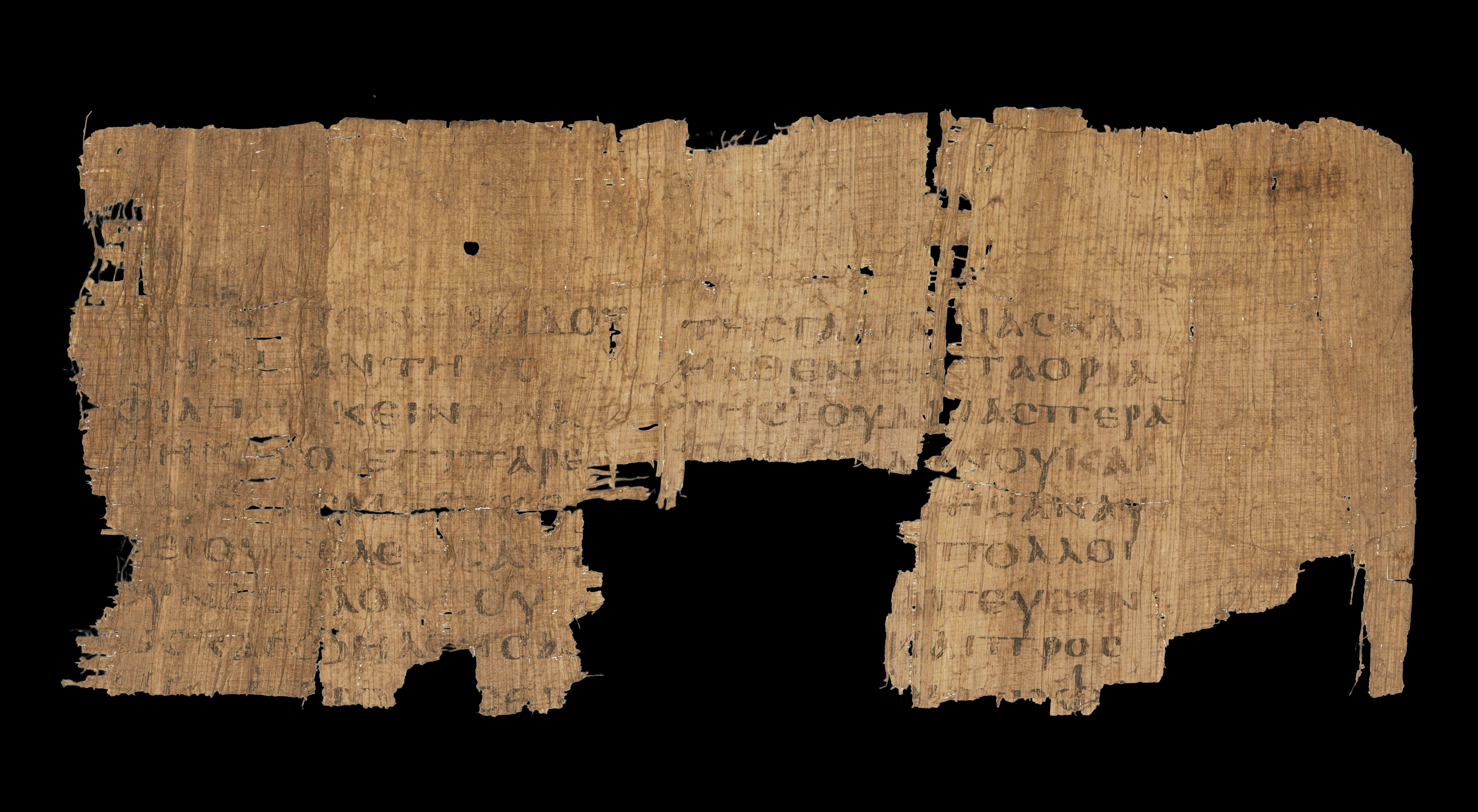
- Recto Matthew 18:32–34; 19:1–3
- Text: Matthew 18-19 †
- Date: 4th century
- Script: Greek
- Found: Egypt
- Now at: Staatliche Museen zu Berlin
- Cite: Otto Stegmüller, Ein Bruchstück aus dem griechischen Diatessaron, ZNW 37 (1938), pp. 223-229.
- Type: Diatesaric text

Papyrus 25 (in the Gregory-Aland numbering), designated by 𝔓^{25}, is an early copy of the New Testament in Greek. It is a papyrus manuscript of the Gospel of Matthew, it contains only Matthew 18:32-34; 19:1-3.5-7.9-10. The manuscript paleographically had been assigned to the early 4th century.

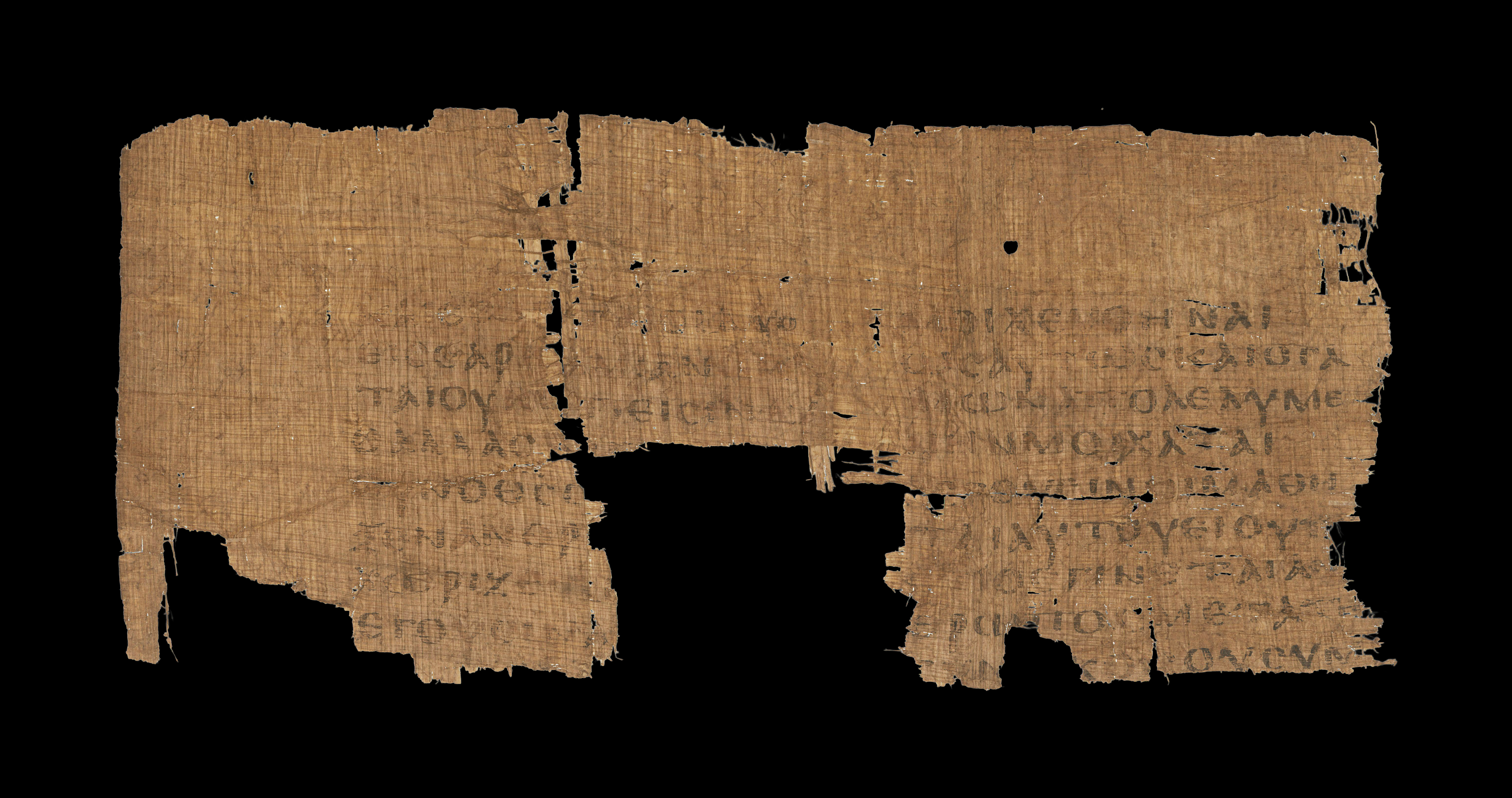
Verso Matthew 19:5–7 and 1:9–10

The Greek text of this codex is unclassifiable because of the Diatessaric character of text (like Dura Parchment 24 (Uncial 0212). Aland did not place it in any of Categories of New Testament manuscripts.

It is currently housed at the Staatliche Museen zu Berlin and part of the Berlin Papyrus Collection (Papyrus Berlin 16388).

== See also ==
- List of New Testament papyri
- Matthew 18, 19
