= Papyrus 71 =

Papyrus 𝔓^{71}
- New Testament manuscript
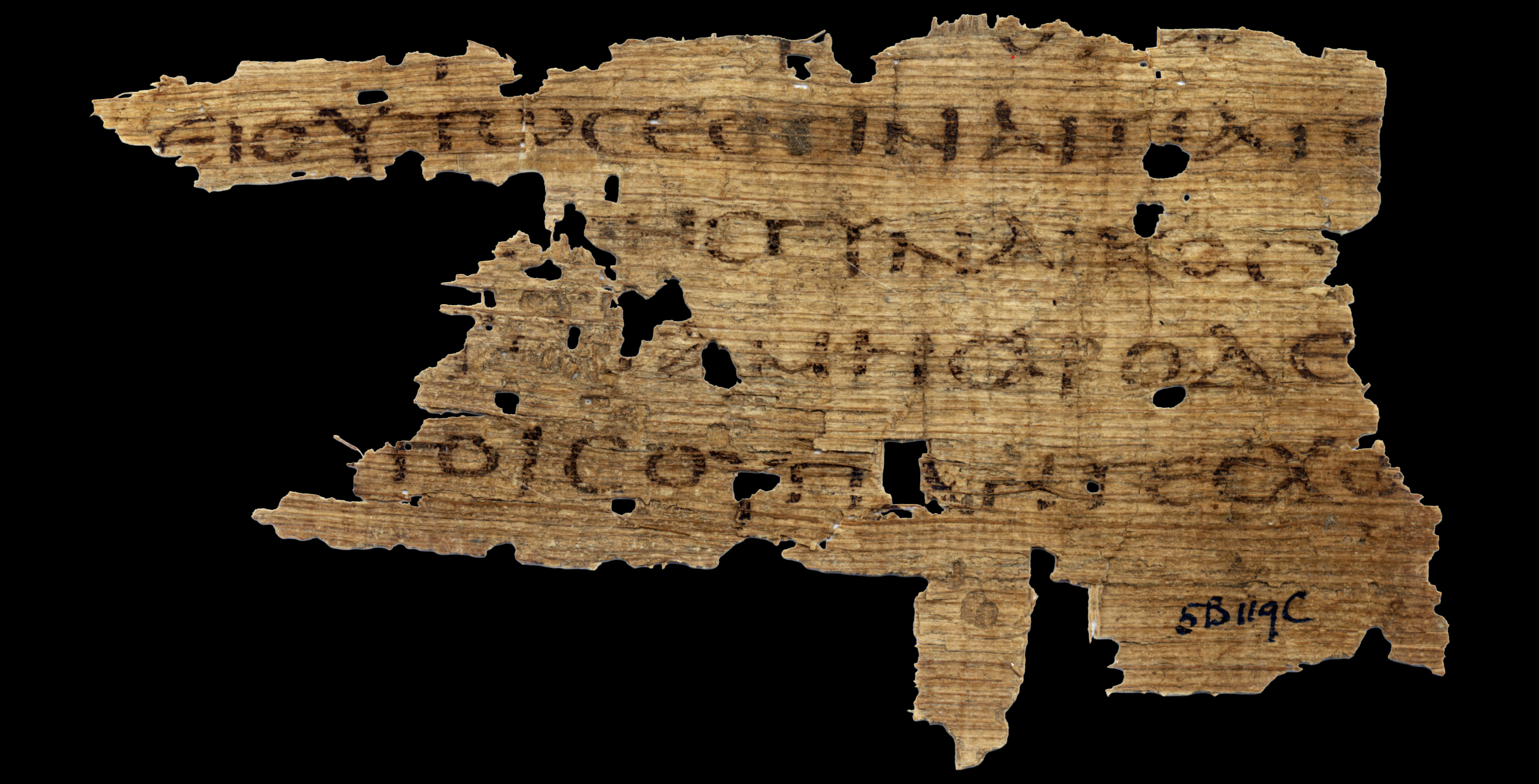
- Recto, Mattew 19:10-11
- Name: P. Oxy. 2385
- Text: Matthew 19 †
- Date: 4th century
- Script: Greek
- Found: Egypt
- Now at: Ashmolean Museum
- Cite: E. Lobel, C. H. Roberts, E. G. Turner, and J. W. B. Barns, OP XXIV (1957), pp. 5-6.
- Type: Alexandrian text-type
- Category: II

Papyrus 71 (in the Gregory-Aland numbering), designated by 𝔓^{71}, is an early copy of the New Testament in Greek. It is a papyrus manuscript of the Gospel of Matthew. The surviving texts of Matthew are verses 19:10-11.17-18. The manuscript paleographically had been assigned to the 4th century.

Text

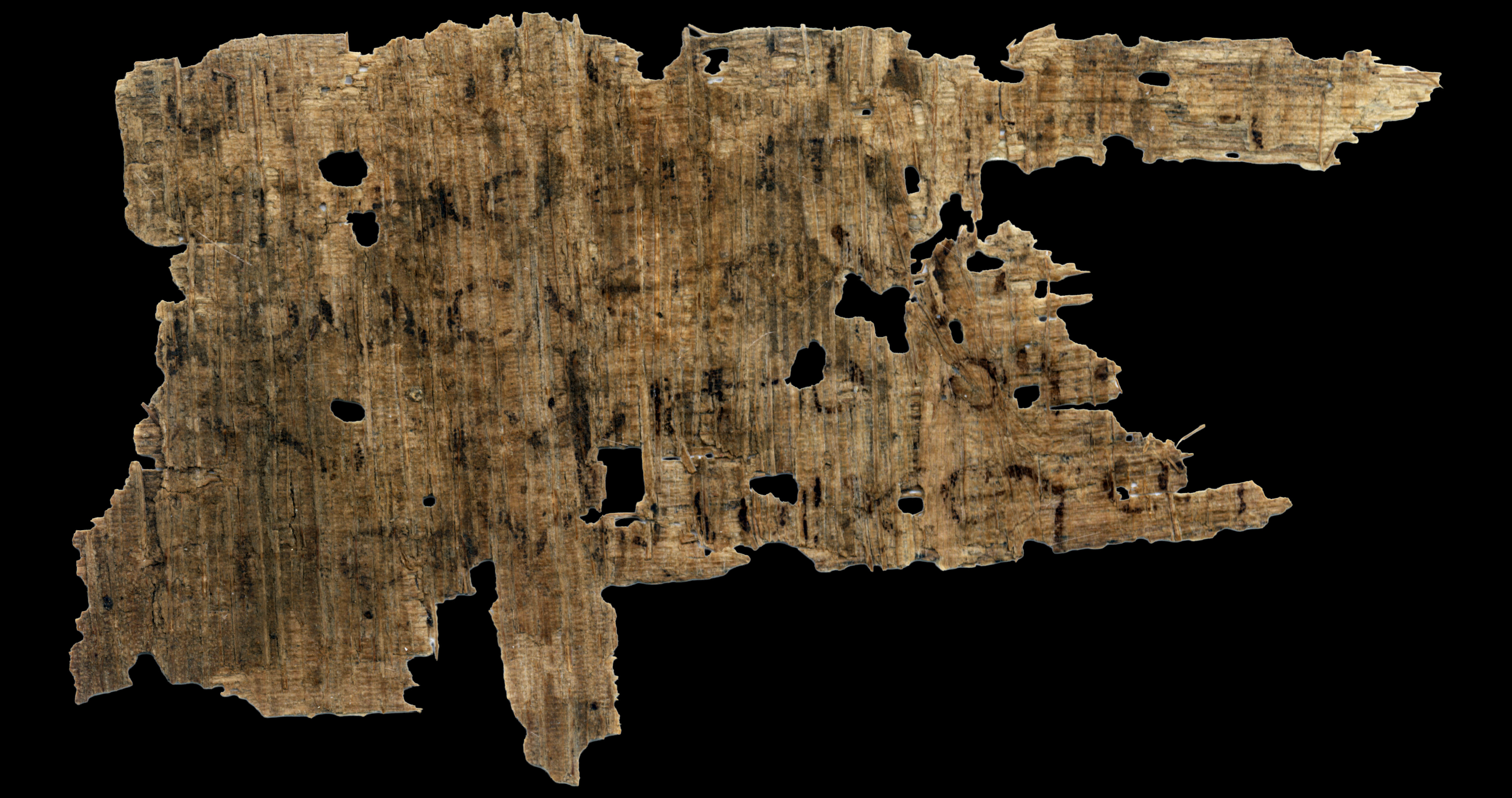
Verso, Recto, Mattew 19:17-18

The Greek text of this codex is a representative of the Alexandrian text-type. Aland placed it in Category II.

Present location

It is currently housed at the Ashmolean Museum (P. Oxy. 2385) in Oxford.

== See also ==
- List of New Testament papyri
- Oxyrhynchus Papyri

== Images ==
- P. Oxy. XXIV Oxyrhynchus 2385 Oxyrhynchus Online
- 𝔓^{71} recto Matt. 19:10-11
- 𝔓^{71} verso Matt. 19:17-18
