= The Return of the Prodigal Son (Batoni) =

Painting by Pompeo Batoni

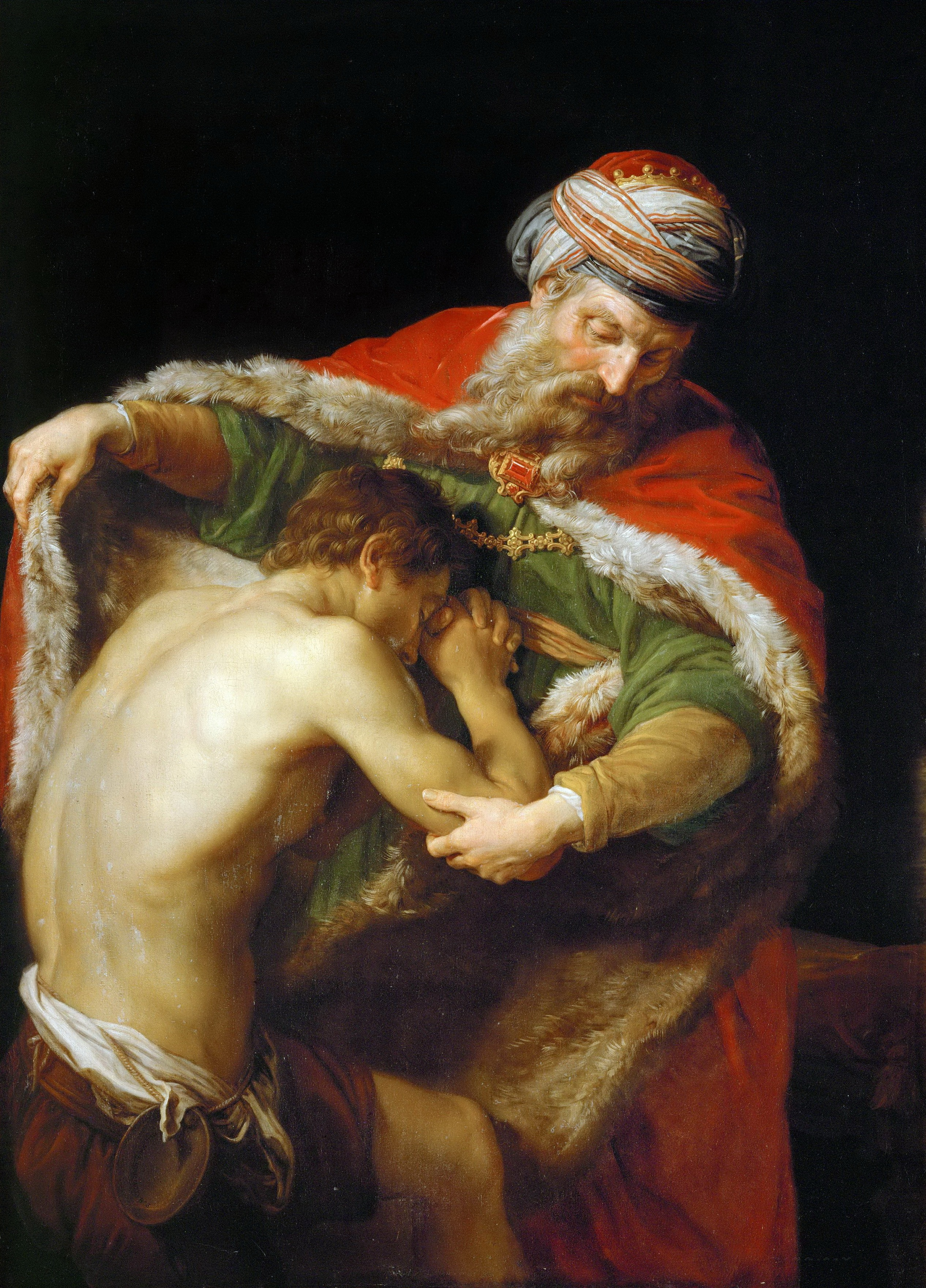
- Artist: Pompeo Batoni
- Year: 1773
- Type: Oil on canvas, history painting
- Dimensions: 138 cm × 100.5 cm (54 in × 39.6 in)
- Location: Kunsthistorisches Museum, Vienna

The Return of the Prodigal Son is a 1773 religious history painting by the Italian artist Pompeo Batoni. It depicts the biblical Parable of the Prodigal Son. The repentant son kneels to ask beg for pardon from his forgiving father who embraces him.

Batoni was a celebrated painter of Neoclassical style, best known for portraits of British Grand Tourists. The painting was bought directly from Batomo by Maria Theresa, the ruler of the Habsburg Empire who also commissioned other worksfrom him. Today the picture is part of the collection of the Kunsthistorisches Museum in Vienna.

== Bibliography ==
- Benzaquén, Adriana S., Morrison, Heidi, Olson, Stephanie (ed.) A Cultural History of Youth in the Age of Enlightenment. Bloomsbury Academic, 2023.
- Bowron, Edgar Peters & Kerber, Peter Björn. Pompeo Batoni: Prince of Painters in Eighteenth-century Rome. Yale University Press, 2007.
- Prohaska, Wolfgang. Kunsthistorisches Museum, Vienna. The Paintings. Beck, 2004.
- Yonan, Michael Elia. Empress Maria Theresa and the Politics of Habsburg Imperial Art. Pennsylvania State University Press, 2011.
