= Parable of the Lost Coin =

Parable taught by Jesus of Nazareth according to the Christian Gospel of Luke

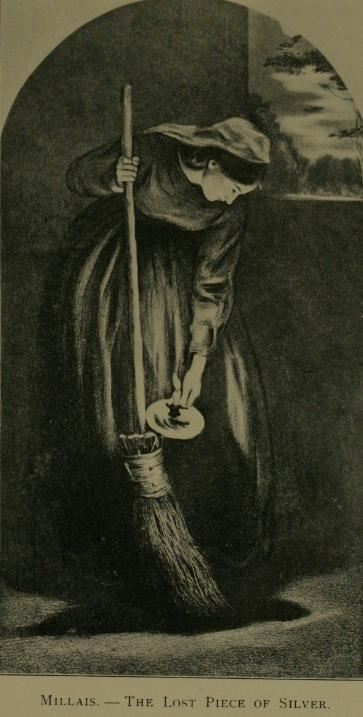
In this parable, a woman sweeps her dark house looking for a lost coin (engraving by John Everett Millais).

The Parable of the Lost Coin is one of the parables of Jesus. It appears in Luke 15:8–10. In it, a woman searches for a lost coin, finds it, and rejoices. It is a member of a trilogy on redemption that Jesus tells after the Pharisees and religious leaders accuse Him of welcoming and eating with "sinners." The other two are the Parable of the Lost Sheep, and the Parable of the Lost Son or Prodigal Son.

== Narrative ==
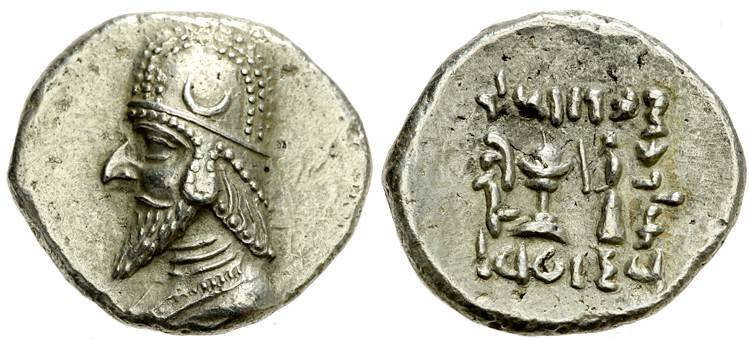
Drachma of the King of Persis Darius II, 1st century AD.

As recounted in Luke 15, a woman with ten silver coins (Greek drachmae) loses one. She then lights an oil lamp and sweeps her house until she finds it, rejoicing when she does:

Or what woman, if she had ten drachma coins, if she lost one drachma coin, wouldn't light a lamp, sweep the house, and seek diligently until she found it? When she has found it, she calls together her friends and neighbors, saying, 'Rejoice with me, for I have found the drachma which I had lost.' Even so, I tell you, there is joy in the presence of the angels of God over one sinner repenting."

— Luke 15:8–10, World English Bible

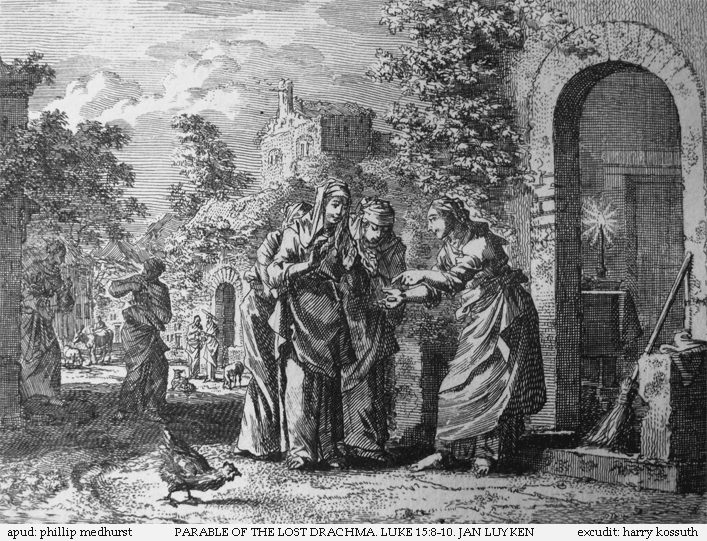
On finding the lost coin, the woman shares her joy with her neighbors (etching by Jan Luyken).

== Interpretation ==
Joel B. Green notes that "the woman described is a poor peasant", and the ten silver coins, corresponding to ten days' wages, "likely represent the family savings". The coins may also have been the woman's dowry, worn as an ornament. Both theories may be true, and either one explains the urgency of the woman's search, and the extent of her joy when the missing coin is found.

Green suggests that the invitation to the "friends and neighbors" may reflect a celebratory meal, which recalls the meals Jesus is accused of sharing with "sinners." The woman's diligent activity in searching may symbolise either Jesus' own activity or that of God the Father. The rejoicing of the angels is understood to be rejoicing along with God.

St. Gregory (Homily 34), explains the parable (reading swept as overturned), writing:

“He who is signified by the shepherd, is signified also by the woman. For it is God Himself—God and the wisdom of God. And because there is an image impressed on the piece, the woman lost the piece of silver when man, who was created after the image of God, by sinning fell away from the likeness of his Creator. The woman lighted a candle, because the wisdom of God appeared in man. For the candle is a light in an earthen vessel, but the light in an earthen vessel is the Godhead in the flesh, and when the candle was lit she overturned (evertit) the house. Because as soon as His divinity shone forth through the flesh, all our consciences were appalled.... Because the corrupt mind, if it be not first overthrown through fear is not cleansed from its habitual faults. But when the house is overturned the piece of silver is found, for when the conscience of man is disturbed, the likeness of the Creator is restored in him."

== Depictions ==
This parable has been depicted by several artists, including John Everett Millais, Jan Luyken, Domenico Fetti, and James Tissot.

== See also ==
- Life of Jesus in the New Testament
- Ministry of Jesus
- Parable of the Lost Sheep
