= Parable of the Prodigal Son =

Parable from the Gospel of Luke

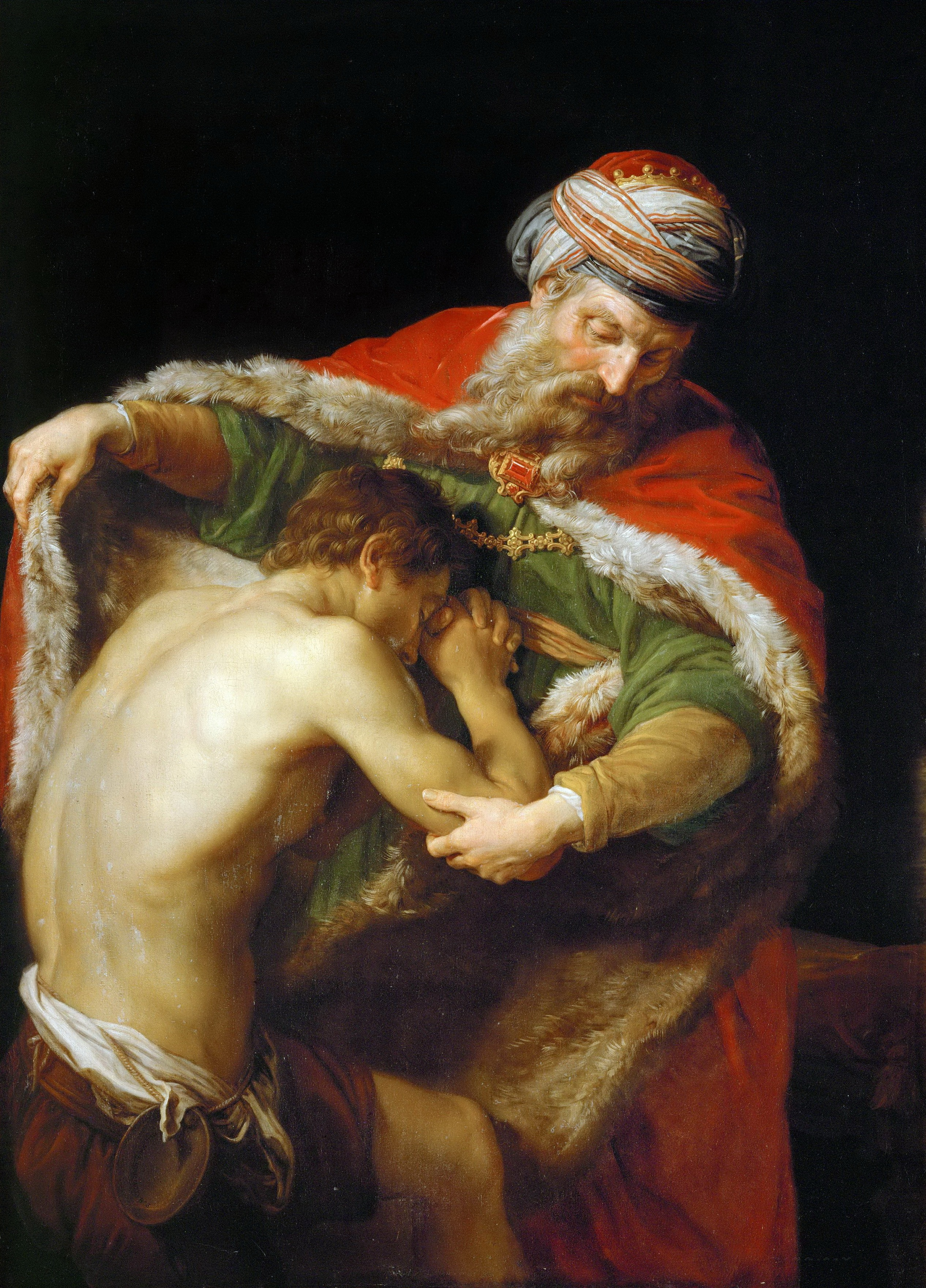
The Return of the Prodigal Son (1773) by Pompeo Batoni

The parable of the Prodigal Son (also known as the parable of the Two Brothers, Lost Son, Loving Father, or of the Forgiving Father; Greek: Παραβολή του Ασώτου Υιού, romanized: Parabolē tou Asōtou Huiou) is one of the parables of Jesus in the Bible, appearing in Luke 15:11–32. (Note: Luke 15:11–32) In Luke 15, Jesus tells this story, along with those of a man with 100 sheep and a woman with ten coins, to a group of Pharisees and religious leaders who criticized him for welcoming and eating with tax collectors and others seen as sinners.

The Prodigal Son is the third and final parable of a cycle on redemption, following the parables of the Lost Sheep and the Lost Coin. In the Revised Common Lectionary and Roman Rite Catholic Lectionary, this parable is read on the fourth Sunday of Lent (in Year C); in the latter it is also included in the long form of the Gospel on the 24th Sunday of Ordinary Time in Year C, along with the preceding two parables of the cycle. In the Eastern Orthodox Church it is read on the Sunday of the Prodigal Son.

== Narrative ==
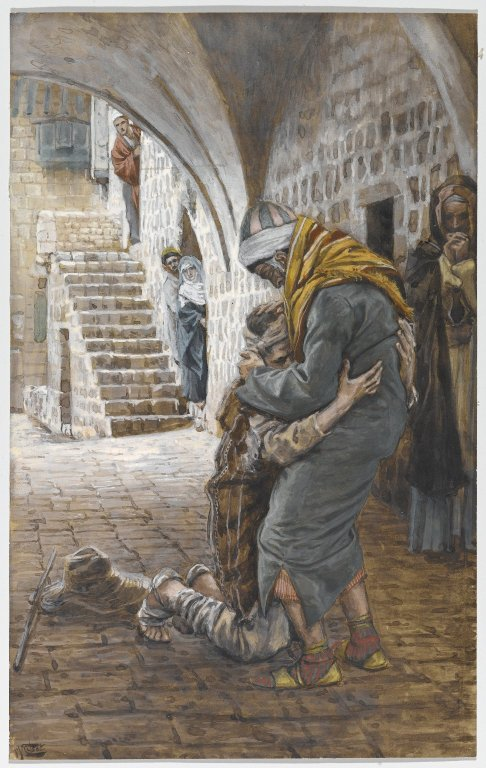
James Tissot – The Return of the Prodigal Son (Le retour de l'enfant prodigue) – Brooklyn Museum

The parable begins with a wealthy man who has two sons, the younger of whom asks for his share of the man's estate. The implication is that the son did not want to wait for his father's death to receive his inheritance but instead wanted it immediately. The father agrees and divides his estate between the two sons.

Upon receiving his portion of the inheritance, the younger son travels to a distant country, where he squanders his wealth through reckless living. He runs out of money just before a severe famine strikes the land, leaving him desperately poor and forced to take a low-paying job as a swineherd. He reaches the point of envying the food of the pigs he is feeding. At this time, he finally comes to his senses: (Note: Luke 15:17–20)

And when he came to himself, he said, How many hired servants of my father's have bread enough and to spare, and I perish with hunger! I will arise and go to my father and will say unto him, Father, I have sinned against heaven, and before thee, and am no more worthy to be called thy son: make me as one of thy hired servants. And he arose and came to his father. But when he was yet a great way off, his father saw him, and had compassion, and ran, and fell on his neck, and kissed him.

— Luke 15:17–20, KJV

This implies that the father was watching hopefully for the son's return. The son starts his rehearsed speech, admitting his sins, and declaring himself unworthy of being his father's son but does not even finish before his father accepts him back without hesitation. The father calls for his servants to dress the son in the finest robe and put a ring on his finger and sandals on his feet and to slaughter the "fatted calf" for a celebratory meal.

The older son, who was at work in the fields, hears the sound of celebration and is told by a slave about the return of his younger brother. He is not impressed and becomes angry. He also has a speech for his father: (Note: Luke 15:29–30)

And he answering said to his father, Lo, these many years do I serve thee, neither transgressed I at any time thy commandment: and yet thou never gavest me a kid, that I might make merry with my friends: but as soon as this thy son was come, which hath devoured thy living with harlots, thou hast killed for him the fatted calf.

— Luke 15:29–30, KJV

The parable stops with the father explaining that while the older son has always been present and that everything the father owns also belongs to the older son, because the younger son had returned, in a sense, from the dead, celebration was necessary: (Note: Luke 15:32)

It was meet that we should make merry, and be glad: for this thy brother was dead, and is alive again; and was lost, and is found.

— Luke 15:32, KJV

== Interpretation ==
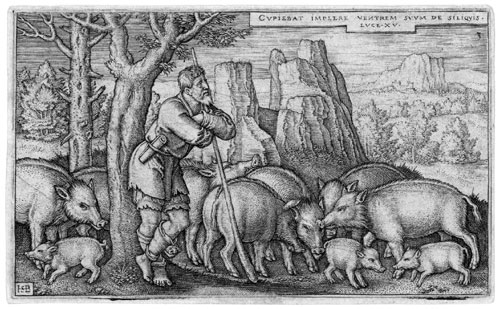
Engraving of the Prodigal Son as a swineherd by Hans Sebald Beham, 1538

The opening, "A man had two sons" is a storyteller's trope and would immediately bring to mind Cain and Abel, Ishmael and Isaac, and Jacob and Esau. Jesus then confounds the listeners' expectations when the younger son is shown to be foolish.

While a number of commentators see the request of the younger son for his share of the inheritance as "brash, even insolent" and "tantamount to wishing that the father was dead," Jewish legal scholar Bernard Jackson says "Jewish sources give no support to [the idea] that the prodigal, in seeking the advance, wishes his father dead."

The young man's actions do not lead to success; he squanders his inheritance and he eventually becomes an indentured servant, with the degrading job of looking after pigs, and even envying them for the carob pods they eat. This recalls Proverbs 29:3: "Whoever loves wisdom gives joy to his father, but whoever consorts with harlots squanders his wealth." (Note: Proverbs 29:3 (NRSV) – via Oremus Proverbs 29:3 (NABRE) – via U.S. Conference of Catholic Bishops)

Upon his return, his father treats the young man with a generosity far more than he has a right to expect. He is given the best robe, a ring for his finger, and sandals for his feet. (Note: Luke 15:22) Jewish philosopher Philo observes:

Parents often do not lose thought for their wastrel (asoton) children [...] In the same way, God too [...] takes thought also for those who live a misspent life, thereby giving them time for reformation, and also keeping within the bounds His own merciful nature.

The Pesikta Rabbati has a similar story:

A king had a son who had gone astray from his father on a journey of a hundred days. His friends said to him, 'Return to your father.' He said, 'I cannot.' Then his father sent word, 'Return as far as you can, and I will come the rest of the way to you.' So God says, 'Return to me, and I will return to you.'

The older son, in contrast, seems to think in terms of "law, merit, and reward," rather than "love and graciousness." He may represent the Pharisees who were criticizing Jesus.

Leviticus Rabbah 13:4 also contains a short saying that matches the character of the parable:

R. Aha has said: When a Jew has to resort to carobs, he repents.

The last few verses of the parable summarize the tale in accordance with the Jewish teaching of the two ways of acting: the way of life (obedience) and the way of death (sin). God, according to Judaism, rejoices over and grants more graces to repentant sinners than righteous souls who do not need repentance.

Following the Parable of the Lost Sheep and the Parable of the Lost Coin, this is the last of three parables about loss and redemption that Jesus tells after the Pharisees and religious leaders accuse him of welcoming and eating with "sinners." The father's joy described in the parable reflects divine love: the "boundless mercy of God," and "God's refusal to limit the measure of his grace."

=== Catholic ===
Justus Knecht, like others, breaks the parable into three parts, noting that, "The father in the parable signifies God; the elder son, the just; and the younger son, the sinner." In the first part:

Man begins to fall away from God by allowing unlawful desires to take possession of his heart. In consequence, he will soon come to regard God's commandments as so many fetters, and to long for greater licence. He loses all taste for prayer and the word of God, and imagines that he would be a happier man if he could live according to his passions. Having thus separated himself inwardly from God, an outward separation speedily follows. He renounces the friendship of good men, neglects the services of the Church and the frequenting of the Sacraments, follows his own way, and shamelessly transgresses God's commandments. He then goes into a strange and distant land, namely further and further from God: The "far country", says St. Augustine, "signifies the forgetfulness of God". Almighty God lets the sinner go his own way, for He has given to man free-will, and does not want a forced obedience, but an obedience springing from love.

Roger Baxter in his Meditations describes the second part:

As soon as this young prodigal had left his father's house he fell into misfortunes. "He began to be in want." Thus sinners who estrange themselves from the sacraments, from exhortation, and the company of the virtuous, soon begin to be in want of spiritual subsistence. "He joined himself to one of the citizens of that country," as a servant. Every sinner is a slave to the Devil; and as the citizen employed the prodigal youth in feeding swine, so the Devil employs his followers in gratifying their own sensual appetites, which brutalize human nature. The prodigal attempted to satisfy his hunger, by feeding on the husks of swine, but he did not succeed: neither can the sinner succeed in filling the capacity of his immortal soul by earthly gratifications.

=== Orthodox ===
In the Eastern Orthodox Church, the parable of the Prodigal Son is central to the Christian understanding emphasizing God's boundless love for humanity. Archpriest Victor Potapov encapsulates this as "a multitude of themes...difficult to enumerate", including the historical contrast between God's chosen people and the pagans, the nature of sin (one reason why the parable is read on the third Sunday before Great Lent, also including the subsequent fasting time to encourage spiritual discipline and refreshment), and the process and blessings of repentance. The Father's forgiving embrace represents God's joy in receiving sinners who return to Him with humility and remorse. It is as an allegory of the Church, with elements like baptism and the Eucharist symbolized through the Father's gifts to his son.

As Fr. Potapov cites, Saint Theophan the Recluse compares the sinner with a man sunk into a deep sleep, and in his turning to God he notes three psychological moments that correspond to the parable's events: 1. Awakening from the sleep of sin (Luke 15:17); 2. The ripening of resolve to forsake sin and dedicate himself to pleasing God (Luke 15:17–21); 3. Investing the sinner with divine power for this in the "Mysteries of Repentance and Communion".

== Commemoration and use ==
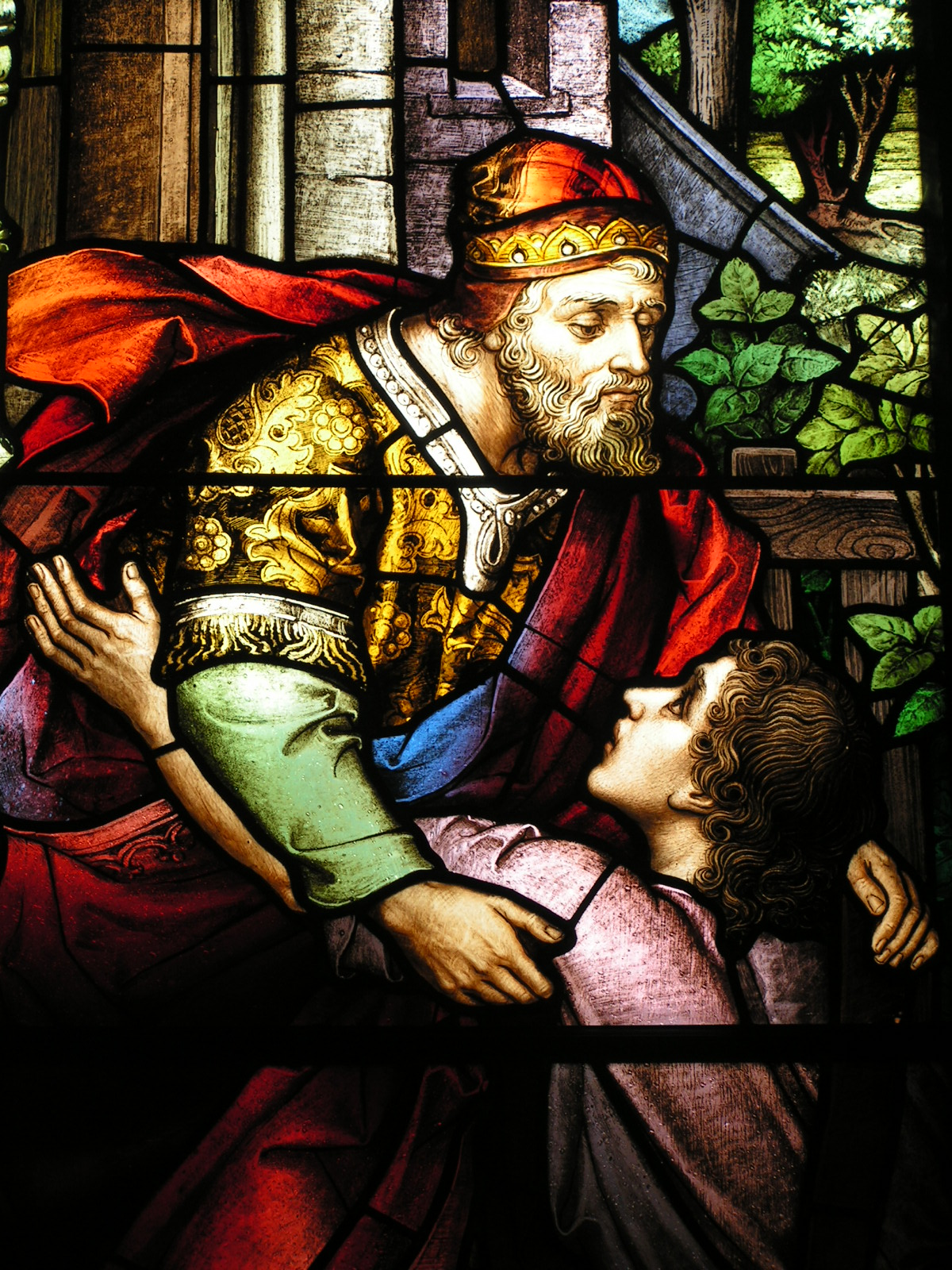
Stained glass window based on the parable, Charleston, South Carolina

=== Orthodox ===
The Eastern Orthodox Church traditionally reads this story on the Sunday of the Prodigal Son, which in their liturgical year is the Sunday before Meatfare Sunday and about two weeks before the beginning of Great Lent. One common kontakion hymn of the occasion reads:

I have recklessly forgotten Your glory, O Father;
And among sinners I have scattered the riches which You gave to me.
And now I cry to You as the Prodigal:
I have sinned before You, O merciful Father;
Receive me as a penitent and make me as one of Your hired servants.

=== Roman Catholic ===
In his 1984 apostolic exhortation titled, in Latin, Reconciliatio et paenitentia ('Reconciliation and Penance'), Pope John Paul II used this parable to explain the process of conversion and reconciliation. Emphasizing that God the Father is "rich in mercy" and always ready to forgive, he stated that reconciliation is a "gift on his part". He stated that for the Church her "mission of reconciliation is the initiative, full of compassionate love and mercy, of that God who is love." He also explored the issues raised by this parable in his second encyclical, Dives in misericordia ('Rich in Mercy'), issued in 1980.

== In the arts ==
=== Visual art ===
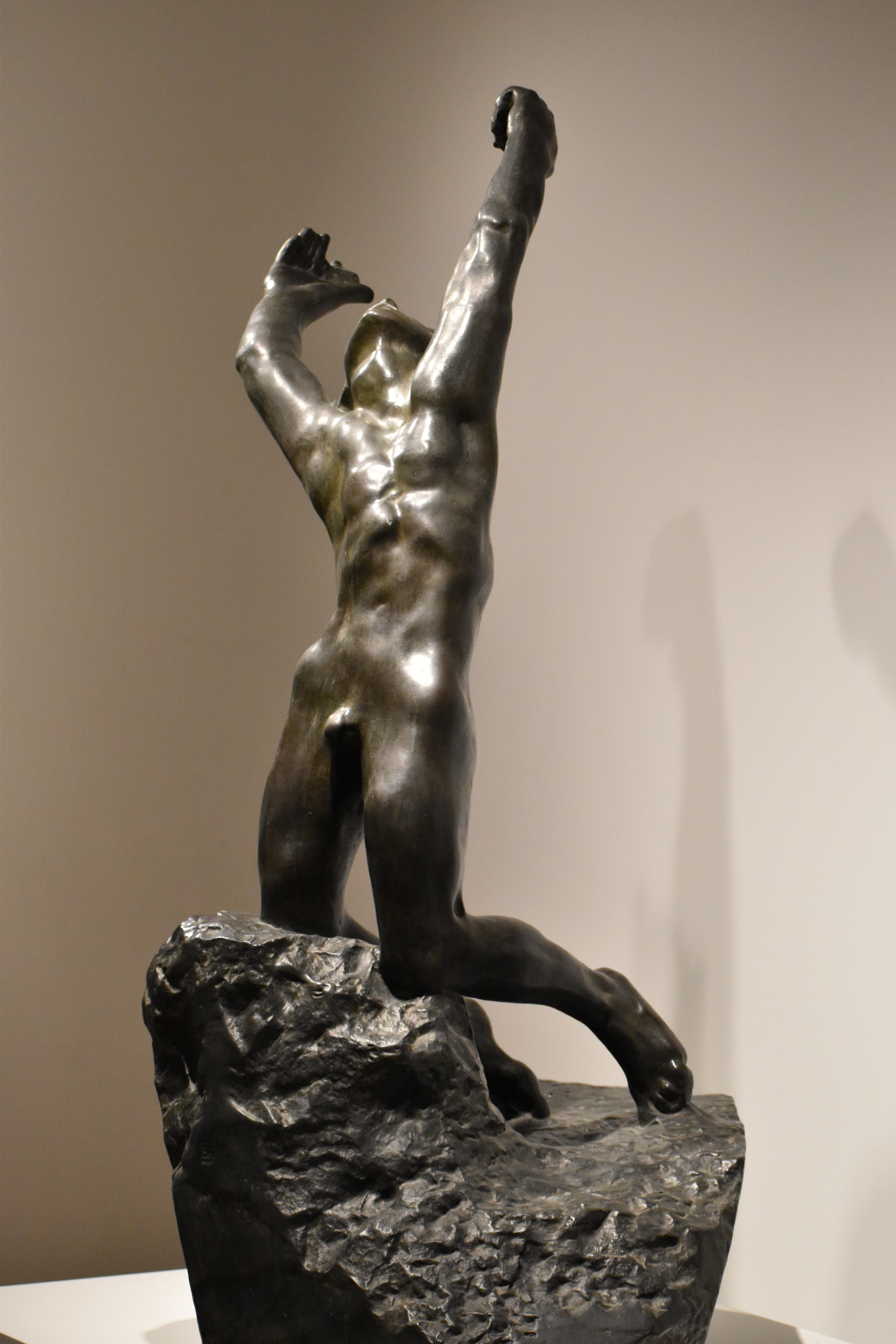
Rembrandt, The Return of the Prodigal Son (1662–1669) and Auguste Rodin's sculpture The Prodigal Son (1905)

Of the roughly 30 parables in the canonical Gospels, the Parable of the Prodigal Son was one of four that were shown in medieval art—along with that of the Wise and Foolish Virgins, the Dives and Lazarus, and the Good Samaritan—almost to the exclusion of the others, though not mixed in with the narrative scenes of the Life of Christ. (The Laborers in the Vineyard also appears in Early Medieval works.)

Scenes of the prodigal son were a popular subject in Northern Renaissance art. Albrecht Dürer's 1496 engraving is a famous example. In the seventeenth-century, Rembrandt depicted several scenes from the parable, especially the final episode, which he etched, drew, or painted on several occasions during his career. At least one of Rembrandt's works—The Prodigal Son in the Tavern, is a portrait of himself as the son reveling with his wife.

The Prodigal Son is a sculpture in Harrisburg, Pennsylvania, by George Grey Barnard that depicts the loving reunion of the father and son from the "Parable of the Prodigal Son." Auguste Rodin also created a sculpture of the Prodigal Son.

=== Theater and film ===
In the 15th and 16th centuries, the theme was such a sufficiently popular subject that the 'Prodigal Son play' can be seen as a subgenre of the English morality play. Examples include The Rare Triumphs of Love and Fortune, The Disobedient Child, and Acolastus.

Many adaptations added to the original Biblical material to lengthen the story. For example, The Prodigal (1955) film took considerable liberties, such as adding a temptress priestess of Astarte to the tale.

=== Music ===
- A 1680 Filius prodigus, H.399 & H.399 a, oratorio by Marc-Antoine Charpentier
- An 1869 oratorio by Arthur Sullivan;
- An 1880 opera by Amilcare Ponchielli;
- A 1884 cantata by Claude Debussy;
- A 1929 ballet choreographed by George Balanchine to music by Sergei Prokofiev;
- A 1957 ballet by Hugo Alfvén; and
- A 1968 opera by Benjamin Britten.

=== Popular music ===
The parable is referenced in the last verse of the traditional Irish folk tune "The Wild Rover":

I'll go home to me parents, confess what I've done
and I'll ask them to pardon their prodigal son

"Jump Around" by the Los Angeles rap group House of Pain (1992) includes a verse by member Everlast, who references the parable as well as the Bible itself:

Word to your moms, I came to drop bombs
I got more rhymes than the Bible's got Psalms
And just like the Prodigal Son I've returned
Anyone stepping to me you'll get burned

==== Other references and semi-adaptations include ====
- "The Return of the Prodigal Son" by trumpeter Freddie Hubbard appears as the second track in his album Backlash (1967).
- "Prodigal Son" by Reverend Robert Wilkins, which tells the story of the parable, is probably better known by the Rolling Stones cover version, which is featured on Beggars Banquet (1968).
- "Prodigal Man", written by Ted Nugent, was performed by The Amboy Dukes as the second track of their third album Migration (1969)
- "Let Me In" by The Osmonds presents a version of the parable as part of their Mormon concept album The Plan (1973), and was a hit song in its time.
- "Prodigal Son" by Steel Pulse, featured on the British Reggae band's debut album Handsworth Revolution (1979), recreates the Biblical story as a Rastafarian parable.
- "Prodigal Son" by British heavy-metal band Iron Maiden appears on their second album Killers (1981).
- "The First Time" by U2, featured on Zooropa (1993), is based on the parable but suggests an alternate ending to the story.
- "The Prodigal Son Suite" by Keith Green is featured on his The Prodigal Son (1983) album and is one of the first posthumous releases by the late piano player and gospel singer.
- "Prodigal Son" by Kid Rock appears on his second album The Polyfuze Method (1993). The Detroit musician later re-recorded the track for his History of Rock (2000) compilation album.
- One, a progressive rock concept album released by Neal Morse in 2004, is based on the prodigal son story.

=== Literature ===
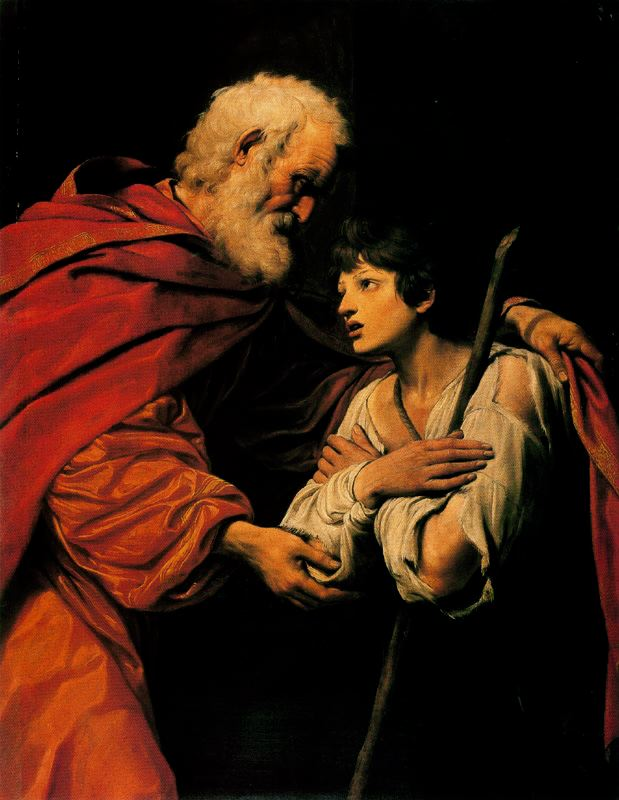
The Return of the Prodigal Son (Leonello Spada, Louvre, Paris)

Another literary tribute to this parable is Dutch theologian Henri Nouwen's 1992 book, The Return of the Prodigal Son: A Story of Homecoming, in which he describes his own spiritual journey infused with understanding, based on an encounter with Rembrandt's painting that depicts the son's return. The book deals with three personages: the younger, prodigal son; the self-righteous, resentful older son; and the compassionate father—all of whom the author identifies with personally. An earlier work with similarities to the parable is "Le retour de l'enfant prodigue" ('The Return of the Prodigal Son'), a short story by André Gide.

Rudyard Kipling wrote a poem giving an interpretation of the younger brother's perspective. The poem appears as the heading to the fifth chapter, titled "The Prodigal Son", of his 1901 novel Kim.

The parable is a recurring theme in the works of Rainer Maria Rilke, who interpreted it in a different way to the conventional reading. Rilke's version is not so concerned with redemption and the forgiveness of family: the love of the family, and human love in general, was seen as less worthy than unreciprocated love, which is the purest form of love. In loving the family less, the Son can love God more, even if this love is not returned.

The theme of the Prodigal Son plays a major role in Anne Tyler's novel A Spool of Blue Thread.

The parable is also referred to in two comedies by William Shakespeare, specifically The Merchant of Venice and As You Like It, as well as in Shakespeare's romance, The Winter's Tale. (Note: Shakespeare, The Winter's Tale 4.4.89.)

In one of his clemency petitions to the Bombay Presidency in 1913, the Indian independence activist Vinayak Damodar Savarkar described himself as a "prodigal son" longing to return to the "parental doors of the government".

== Similar parable in Mahayana Buddhism ==
A parable of a lost son can also be found in the Mahayana Buddhist Lotus Sutra. The two parables share the premise of a father and son being reunited after a time apart, and several scholars have assumed that one version has influenced the other or that both texts share a common origin. However, an influence of the biblical story on the Lotus sutra is very unlikely given the early dating of the stratum of the sutra containing the Buddhist parable.

Both parables document a son who leaves a father. In the Lotus sutra, there is a lapse of decades after which the poor son no longer recognises his wealthy father and is terrified of his father's accumulated power and wealth. When the father sends out some attendants to welcome the son, the son panics. The father then lets the son leave without telling him of their kinship, providing him with a heap of straw to sleep on and employment clearing a pile of dirt.

As the decades pass, the father gradually conditions the son to his company and gets him accustomed to special honors. Close to death, the wealthy man reveals his kinship with a public announcement to the whole community. The sutra applies the story to the human quest for omniscience which is unexpectedly received. In the Buddhist parable, the father symbolises the Buddha, and the son symbolises any human being. Their kinship symbolises that any being has Buddha nature. The concealment of the kinship of the father to his son is regarded as a skillful means (Sanskrit: upāya).

== See also ==
- Ministry of Jesus
- Parable of the Workers in the Vineyard regarding the theme of God's unmerited grace, as distinguished from the idea of "earning" God's favour.
