= Parable of the Lost Sheep =

Parable of Jesus

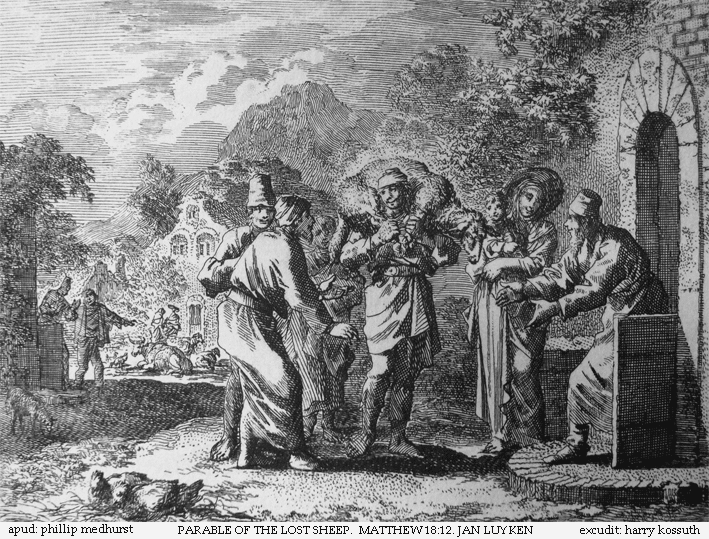
Etching by Jan Luyken showing the triumphant return of the shepherd, from the Bowyer Bible.

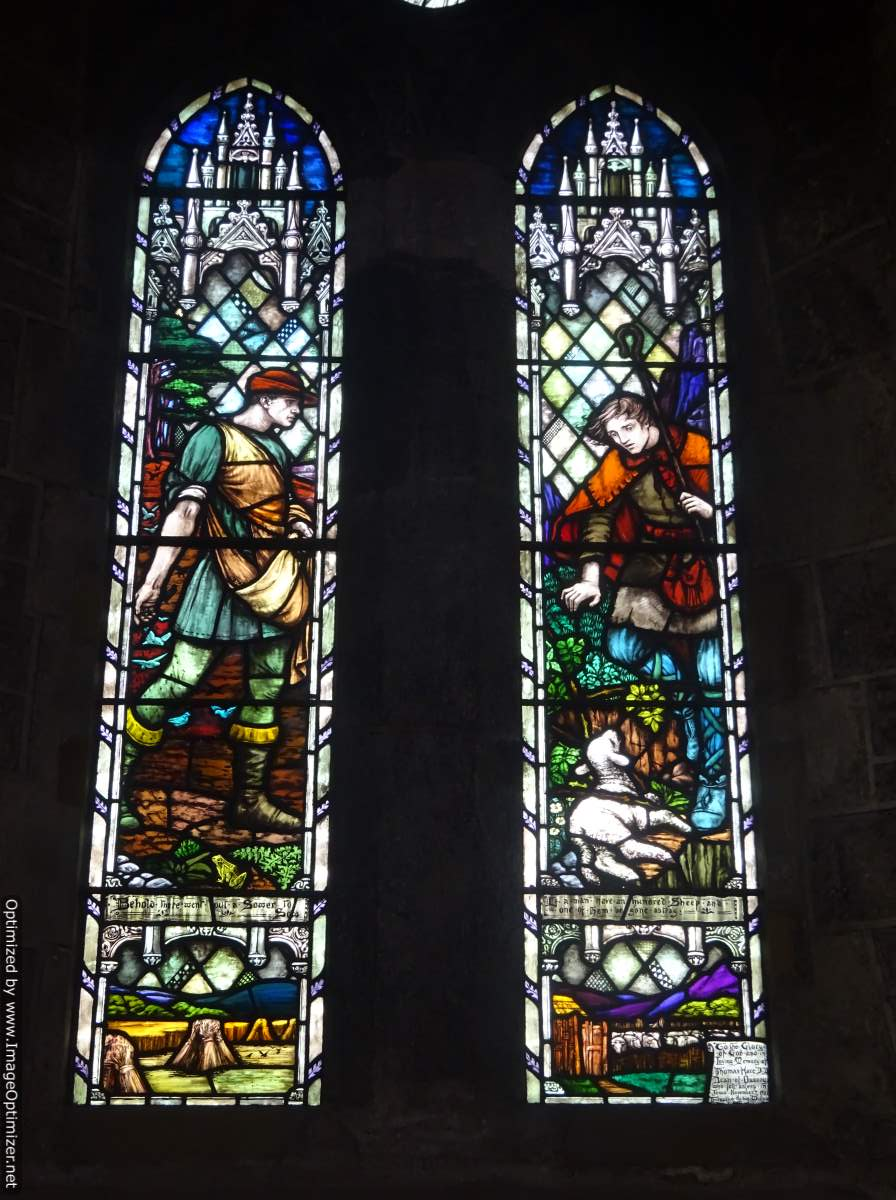
Parable of the Lost Sheep (right) in St Mary's Cathedral, Kilkenny, Ireland

The Parable of the Lost Sheep is one of the parables of Jesus. It appears in the Gospels of Matthew (Matthew 18:12–14) and Luke (Luke 15:3–7). It is about a man who leaves his flock of ninety-nine sheep in order to find the one which is lost. In Luke 15, it is the first member of a trilogy about redemption that Jesus addresses to the Pharisees and religious leaders after they accuse him of welcoming and eating with sinners.

== Narrative ==
In the Gospel of Luke, the parable is as follows:

He told them this parable. "Which of you men, if you had one hundred sheep, and lost one of them, wouldn't leave the ninety-nine in the wilderness, and go after the one that was lost, until he found it? When he has found it, he carries it on his shoulders, rejoicing. When he comes home, he calls together his friends, his family and his neighbors, saying to them, 'Rejoice with me, for I have found my sheep which was lost!' I tell you that even so there will be more joy in heaven over one sinner who repents, than over ninety-nine righteous people who need no repentance."

— Luke 15:3–7, World English Bible

== Interpretation ==
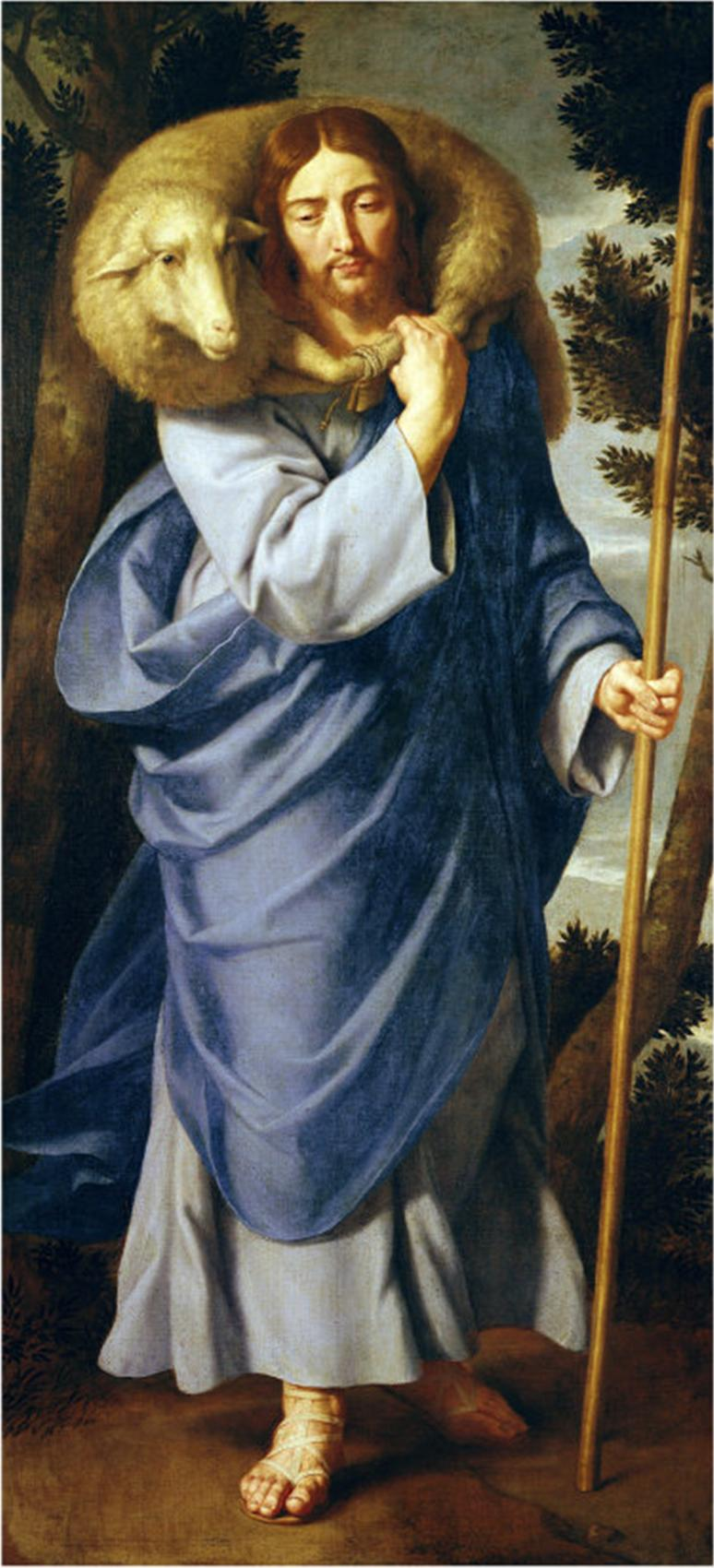
Depiction of the Good Shepherd by Jean-Baptiste de Champaigne showing the influence of this parable.

The Parable of the Lost Sheep is followed by those of the Lost Coin and the Prodigal Son in Luke's Gospel and shares with them the themes of losing, searching, finding, and rejoicing. The lost sheep or coin represents a lost human being.

As in the analogy of the Good Shepherd, some consider Jesus to be the shepherd in the parable, thus identifying himself with the image of God as a shepherd searching for stray sheep in Ezekiel 34:11–16. Joel B. Green writes that "these parables are fundamentally about God, ... their aim is to lay bare the nature of the divine response to the recovery of the lost." The rejoicing of the shepherd with his friends represents God rejoicing with the angels. The image of God rejoicing at the recovery of lost sinners contrasts with the criticism of the religious leaders which prompted the parable.

Justus Knecht gives the typical Catholic interpretation of this parable, writing:

By the simile of the Good Shepherd our Lord teaches us how great is His compassionate love for all mankind. All men, Jews and Gentiles, are His sheep, and He gave His life for all, being sacrificed on the Cross to redeem them from sin and hell. He is therefore the only Good Shepherd, and all others who are called to the pastoral office are good shepherds only so far as they imitate Jesus in their love and care of the flock confided to them. Moreover Jesus knows His own. He knows all about them, their needs, their weakness, their thoughts, their endeavours; He leads them into the fold of His Church, He helps them by His grace, He enlightens them by His doctrine, and nourishes and strengthens them with His Flesh and Blood in the most Blessed Sacrament. His pastoral love is, therefore, infinite and divine.

Cornelius a Lapide in his Great Commentary writes,

So we, by reason of our sinful lusts, were as wandering sheep, treading the path which led to perdition, without a thought of God or of heaven, or of the salvation of our souls. Wherefore Christ came down from heaven to seek us, and to lead us back from the way of destruction to that which leadeth to eternal life. So we read, "All we like sheep have gone astray; we have turned every one to his own way; and the Lord hath laid on Him the iniquity of us all," Isa. 53:6; and again, "Ye were as sheep going astray; but are now returned unto the Shepherd and Bishop of your souls." 1 Peter 2:25.

== Depiction in art ==
The image from this parable of the shepherd placing the lost sheep on his shoulders (Luke 15:5) has been widely incorporated into depictions of the Good Shepherd. Consequently, this parable appears in art mostly as an influence on depictions of the Good Shepherd rather than as a distinct subject on its own.

== Hymns ==
While there are innumerable references to the Good Shepherd image in Christian hymns, specific references to this parable can be recognised by a mention of the ninety-nine other sheep.

A hymn describing this parable is "The Ninety and Nine" by Elizabeth Clephane (1868), which begins:

There were ninety and nine that safely lay
In the shelter of the fold.
But one was out on the hills away,
Far off from the gates of gold.
Away on the mountains wild and bare.
Away from the tender Shepherd's care.
Away from the tender Shepherd's care.

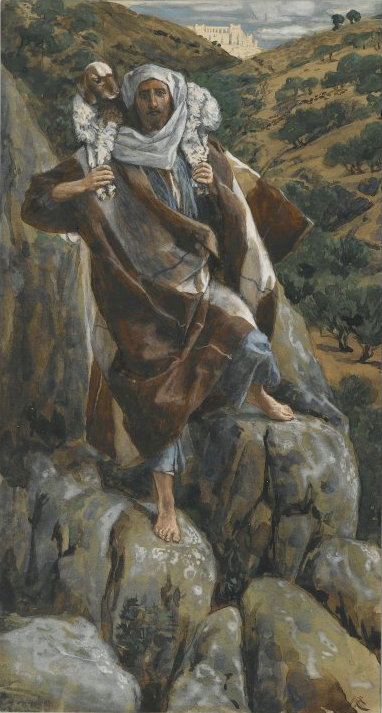
James Tissot – The Good Shepherd (Le bon pasteur) – Brooklyn Museum

== See also ==
- Five Discourses of Matthew
- Life of Jesus in the New Testament
- Ministry of Jesus
- The Sheep and Goats
- Good Shepherd
- Parable of the Lost Coin
