= The Prodigal Son =

The Parable of the Prodigal Son is a parable of Jesus in the Bible.

The Prodigal Son or Prodigal Son may also refer to:

== Film ==
- L'Enfant prodigue (1907 film) (The Prodigal Son), by Michel Carré, based on his play
- L'Enfant prodigue (1909 film), a short silent film by Georges Berr
- The Prodigal Son (1923 film), a British silent film based on Hall Caine's novel
- The Prodigal Son (1934 film), a German film
- The Prodigal Son, a 1952 Hong Kong film directed by Ng Wui
- The Prodigal Son (1962 film), an Australian TV production of an opera by Debussy
- The Prodigal Son (1981 film), a Hong Kong comedy film directed by Sammo Hung
- The Prodigal Son (1993 film), a short animation
- Prodigal Sons (film), a 2008 American documentary

== Literature ==
- The Prodigal Son (Caine novel), 1904
- Prodigal Son (novel), by Dean Koontz, 2005

== Music ==
- Prodigal Son (musician), Calvin Curtis Whilby (born 1976), Jamaican gospel singer

=== Classical ===
- L'enfant prodigue (ballet), an 1812 ballet-pantomime by Pierre Gardel
- L'enfant prodigue (Auber) (The Prodigal Son), an 1850 grand opera by Daniel Auber
- The Prodigal Son (Sullivan), an 1869 oratorio by Arthur Sullivan
- L'enfant prodigue (Debussy) (The Prodigal Son), an 1884 cantata by Debussy
- Prodigal Son (ballet), a 1929 ballet by George Balanchine
  - Prodigal Son, music for the ballet by Prokofiev
- The Prodigal Son, a 1938 ballet by David Lichine
- The Prodigal Son a 1945 opera by Frederick Jacobi
- The Prodigal Son (Den förlorade sonen), a 1957 ballet suite by Hugo Alfvén
- The Prodigal Son (Britten), a 1968 opera by Benjamin Britten

=== Albums ===
- The Prodigal Son (Keith Green album), 1983
- Prodigal Son (The Saints album), 1988
- Prodigal Son (Martin Simpson album), 2007
- The Prodigal Son (Nektar album), 2001
- The Prodigal Son, disc 2 of G-Funk Classics, Vol. 1 & 2 by Nate Dogg, 1988
- Prodigal Son (Michael Powers album) an album by Blues musician Michael Powers, 2006
- The Prodigal Son (Ry Cooder album), 2018
- Prodigal Sons, a 1983 album by The Dubliners

=== Songs ===
- "The Prodigal Son", a song (originally called "That's No Way to Get Along"), written by Robert Wilkins
  - covered by the Rolling Stones on the 1968 album Beggars Banquet
- "Prodigal Son", a single by Steel Pulse from the 1978 album Handsworth Revolution
- "Prodigal Son", a song by Iron Maiden from the 1981 album Killers
- "Prodigal Son", a single by Kid Rock from the 1993 album The Polyfuze Method (also re-recorded for the 2000 compilation The History of Rock)
- "The Prodigal Son", a song by Extol from the 1999 album Mesmerized
- "The Prodigal Son", a song by Two Gallants from the 2006 album What the Toll Tells
- "Prodigal Son", a song by Bad Religion from the 2007 album New Maps of Hell
- "Prodigal Son" (Sevendust song), 2008
- "Prodigal Son", a song by Sam Amidon from the 2008 album All Is Well
- "Prodigal Son", a song by Kamelot from the 2012 album Silverthorn
- "The Prodigal Son", a song by Fallujah from the 2016 album Dreamless

== Painting and sculpture ==
- The Return of the Prodigal Son (Rembrandt), a painting, c. 1669
- The Prodigal Son (Giorgio de Chirico), a painting, 1922
- The Prodigal Son (Rubens), a painting by Peter Paul Rubens, 1618
- The Prodigal Son (van Hemessen), a painting by Jan Sanders van Hemessen, 1536
- The Prodigal Son (sculpture), by Rodin

== Television ==
- "The Prodigal Son" an episode of War of the Worlds
- "Prodigal Son", an episode of Miami Vice season 2
- "Prodigal Son", an episode of Everybody Loves Raymond season 4
- "Prodigal Son", an episode of Teenage Mutant Ninja Turtles season 4
- "Prodigal Son" (Vera), a 2013 episode
- Prodigal Son (TV series), an American drama series airing on Fox

== Theatre ==
- The Prodigal Son, a 1905 play based on The Prodigal Son (Hall Caine novel)
- Prodigal Son, a 2016 play by John Patrick Shanley
- The Prodigal, a 1960 play by Jack Richardson
- L'Enfant prodigue (Voltaire), a 1736 play by Voltaire

== See also ==
- Prodigal Daughter (disambiguation)
- Lost Son (disambiguation)
- The Prodigal (disambiguation)
- Return of the Prodigal Son (disambiguation)
- Prodigal Sun, a 2000 album by The Dawn
