= The Prodigal (disambiguation) =

The Prodigal is a 1955 epic biblical film.

The Prodigal, Prodigal or Prodigals may also refer to:

== Arts, entertainment and media ==
=== Film and television ===
- The Prodigal (1931 film), an early talkie film
- The Prodigal (1983 film), directed by James F. Collier
- "The Prodigal" (Angel), a 2000 episode of the TV show
- "The Prodigal", a 1985 episode of MacGyver (TV series)
- "The Prodigal", a 1996 episode of Xena: Warrior Princess (season 1) TV series
- "The Prodigal", a 2008 episode of Stargate Atlantis (season 5) TV series
- "Prodigal", a 2003 episode of Smallville (season 2) TV series

=== Music ===
- Prodigal (band), an American progressive contemporary Christian music band
  - Prodigal (album), a 1982 album by the band
- "Prodigal", a song by Porcupine Tree from the 2002 album In Absentia
- "Prodigal", a song by OneRepublic from the 2007 album Dreaming Out Loud
- "Prodigal", a song by Sidewalk Prophets from the 2015 album Something Different
- "Prodigal", a song by Relient K from the 2016 album Air for Free
- "The Prodigal", a song by Placebo from the 2022 album Never Let Me Go
- The Prodigal (Mr. P album), a 2021 album by Nigerian singer Mr. P
- The Prodigal (Josiah Queen album), 2024
- The Prodigals, an American Irish punk band

=== Theatre ===
- The Prodigal, a 1960 play by Jack Richardson
- Prodigal (musical), a 2000 musical by Dean Bryant and Mathew Frank
- Prodigals (play), by Sean Minogue, 2011

=== Other uses in arts and entertainment ===
- The Prodigal, a 2004 poetry collection by Derek Walcott

== Other uses ==
- PRODIGAL (computer system)
- Project Prodigal, a concept for a flying 4x4 vehicle

== See also ==
- The Prodigal Son (disambiguation)
- Prodigal Daughter (disambiguation)
- Return of the Prodigal Son (disambiguation)
- Prodigy (disambiguation)
