= List of Argentine films of 1984 =

A list of films produced in Argentina in 1984:

Argentine films of 1984
Title	Director	Release	Genre
A - M
Asesinato en el Senado de la Nación	Juan José Jusid	13 September	
Atrapadas	Aníbal Di Salvo	16 August	
Camila	María Luisa Bemberg	17 May	History
The Children of the War (Los chicos de la guerra)	Bebe Kamin		
Cuarteles de invierno	Lautaro Murúa	6 September	drama
Darse cuenta	Alejandro Doria	30 August	
En retirada	Juan Carlos Desanzo	28 June	
Evita (quien quiera oír que oiga)	Eduardo Mignogna	26 April	History
Gracias por el fuego	Sergio Renán	5 April	
Los hijos de Fierro	Fernando Solanas	12 April	
Insaciable	Armando Bó	27 September	
El juguete rabioso	José María Paolantonio	11 October	drama
Malvinas: Historia de traiciones	Jorge Denti	6 September	
Mingo y Aníbal, dos pelotazos en contra	Enrique Cahen Salaberry	19 July	Comedy
N - Z
Noches sin lunas ni soles	José A. Martínez Suárez	21 June	drama
Pasajeros de una pesadilla	Fernando Ayala	14 June	
La pródiga	Mario Soffici	16 August	
Los reyes del sablazo	Enrique Carreras	16 February	Comedy
La Rosales	David Lipszyc	30 August	
Sálvese quien pueda	Enrique Carreras	5 July	
Todo o nada	Emilio Vieyra	2 August	
Titanes en el ring contraataca	Máximo Berrondo	12 January	
Los tigres de la memoria	Carlos Galettini	20 September	
Venido a menos	Alejandro Azzano	11 October	
Victoria 392	Fernando Castets and Juan José Campanella	19 October	
