= Diego Duarte =

Diego Duarte may refer to:

- Diego Duarte (art collector) (1612–1691), Portuguese jeweler, banker, composer, organist and art collector
- Diego Duarte (footballer, born 2002), Paraguayan football forward
- Diego Duarte (footballer, born 2006), Luxembourgish football midfielder
- Diego Duarte (sports shooter) (born 1970), Colombian sport shooter
