= The Prodigal Woman =

The Prodigal Woman may refer to:

- The Prodigal Woman (1984 film), an Argentine drama film
- The Prodigal Woman (1946 film), a Spanish drama film

== See also ==
- Prodigal Daughter (disambiguation)
