= Winterbound =

1936 children's noval by Margery Williams

- Author: Margery Williams
- Illustrator: Kate Seredy
- Language: English
- Genre: Children's literature
- Publisher: Viking
- Publication date: October 2, 1936
- Publication place: United States
- Pages: 324

Winterbound is a 1936 children's novel written by Margery Williams and illustrated by Kate Seredy. It is a family story set in a Connecticut farmhouse during the Great Depression. Nineteen-year-old Kay and sixteen-year-old Garry are in charge of the house and their younger siblings while their parents are away during the winter.

== Reception ==
The novel was a Newbery Honor recipient in 1937; Seredy's own novel The White Stag would win the Newbery Medal the next year. The New York Times review complimented Williams' writing, saying "she writes with a pleasuring simplicity and directness" and "it gives the impression that the author has lived through some of the experiences described". Kirkus Reviews also observed that "the adventures and misadventures have roots in personal experience".
