= The Prodigal Son (Rubens) =

Painting by Peter Paul Rubens

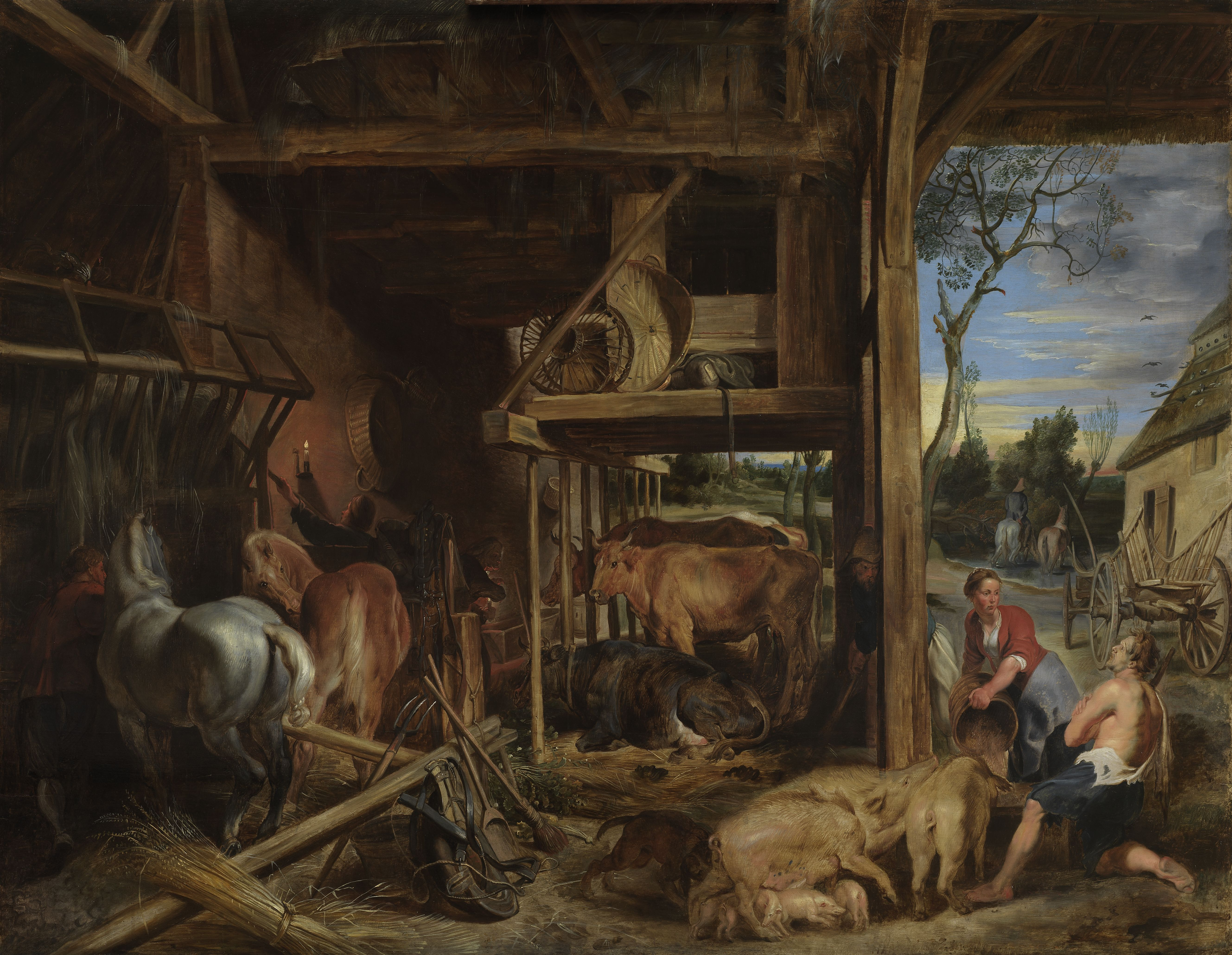
The Prodigal Son (1618) by Rubens

The Prodigal Son is an unsigned 1618 painting by Peter Paul Rubens. It is now in the Royal Museum of Fine Arts, Antwerp as catalogue number 781 - the Museum bought it via the Paris-based art dealer Léon Gauchez in 1894. The work was examined during the 2007 Rubens research project

It shows the point in the parable of the prodigal son where the protagonist is forced to live as a swine-herd (Luke, 15: 15–16). Preparatory drawings for it survive in the Chatsworth collection and the Ashmolean Museum, whilst the final work was engraved by Schelte Adamsz. Bolswert. The work was mentioned in Rubens' will, implying it was still in his studio on his death in 1640. It is known to have been owned by a Mrs Spangen in Antwerp in 1771, who probably bought it via the Antwerp-based art dealer Diego Duarte. It was later recorded as being owned by Edward Ravenell and the Antwerp resident Pieter van Aertselaer. In 1823-1824 it was offered for sale by John Smith and at some time after that in the 1820s and/or 1830s it was owned by the English portraitist Thomas Lawrence.

It was recorded in 1836 in the collection of William Wilkins and at an auction of his collection two years later it was bought by a man named Farrer or Farrar, who quickly sold it on to Andrew Fountaine. It was seen in Fountaine's collection in 1854 by Gustav Friedrich Waagen. It was exhibited at the Royal Academy's Old Masters and deceased masters of the British School in 1880 before being bought by its present owner.

== Bibliography ==
- (in Dutch) A.J.J. Delen, in Koninklijk Museum voor Schone Kunsten - Antwerpen. Beschrijvende Catalogus. I. Oude meesters, 1948, p. 229.
- (in Dutch) Glück-Haberditzl, nr. 94. Delen, Teekeningen van Vlaamsche Meesters, blz. 103, pl. LVIII. 67.
