= Xyzoo Animation =

Animation studio from South Africa

Xyzoo Animation is an animation studio founded by director/animator Lindsay van Blerk in 1991. Situated in Cape Town, South Africa, the studio has produced five stop-motion/clay-animated films, three of which have won a number of awards. All were commissioned by New York-based Billy Budd Films. The studio has also produced more than 50 animated commercials using clay animation, mixed media stop-motion puppets, cel animation, flash and pixilation.

== Films ==
- The Velveteen Rabbit (2003) 24 minutes. Based on the 1921 classic by Margery Williams. Narrated by Jennifer Shapiro. Clay animation. Cine Special Jury award, USA, 2004. Booklist Editor’s Choice, USA, 2005. Screened at Hiroshima International Animation Festival, 2004.
- The Chimes (2000) 24 minutes. Based on the original novella by Charles Dickens. Narrated by Derek Jacobi. Clay animation. Cine Special Jury award, USA, 2002.
- The First Christmas (1998) 24 minutes. Traditional Christmas Story narrated by Christopher Plummer. Clay animation. Andrew Carnegie Gold Medal, USA, 1999.
- Michael the Visitor (1995) 24 minutes. Based on a short story by Leo Tolstoy. Narrated by Stockard Channing. Clay animation. Screened at Hiroshima International Animation Festival 1996 and Stuttgart Trickfilm 1997.
- The Prodigal Son (1993) 8 minutes. An African-American spiritual poem by James Weldon Johnson narrated by Dorian Harewood. Clay animation.

== See also ==
- List of stop-motion films
