= The Prodigal Son in the Brothel =

Painting by Rembrandt

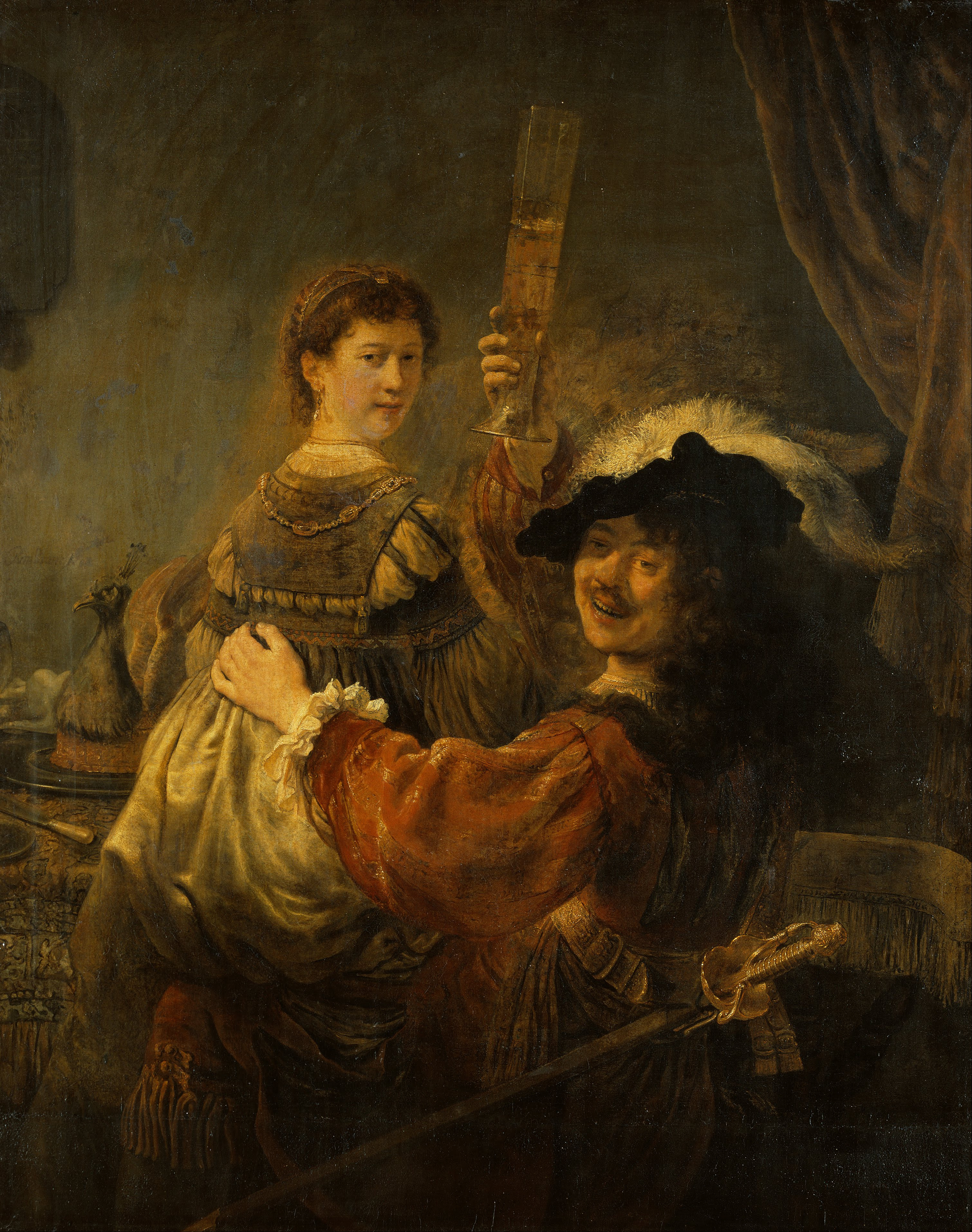
- Artist: Rembrandt
- Year: c. 1635
- Medium: Oil on canvas
- Dimensions: 161 cm × 131 cm (63 in × 52 in)
- Location: Gemäldegalerie Alte Meister, Dresden

The Prodigal Son in the Brothel or The Prodigal Son in the Tavern or Rembrandt and Saskia in the parable of the prodigal son (German: Rembrandt und Saskia im Gleichnis vom verlorenen Sohn) is a painting by the Dutch master Rembrandt. It is now in the Gemäldegalerie Alte Meister of Dresden, Germany. It is signed "REMBRANDT F.".

It portrays two people who had been identified as Rembrandt himself and his wife Saskia. In the Protestant contemporary world, the theme of the prodigal son was a frequent subject for works of art due to its moral background. Rembrandt himself painted a Return of the Prodigal Son in 1669.

The left side of the canvas was cut, perhaps by the artist himself, to remove secondary characters and focus the observer's attention on the main theme.

== Painting materials ==
The pigment analysis shows Rembrandt's choice of the usual baroque pigments such as red ochre, lead-tin-yellow, madder lake and smalt, as well as his elaborate multilayer painting technique.

== See also ==
- List of paintings by Rembrandt

== Sources ==
- D'Adda, Roberta (2006). Rembrandt. Milan: Skira.
