= The Chimes =

1844 novella by Charles Dickens

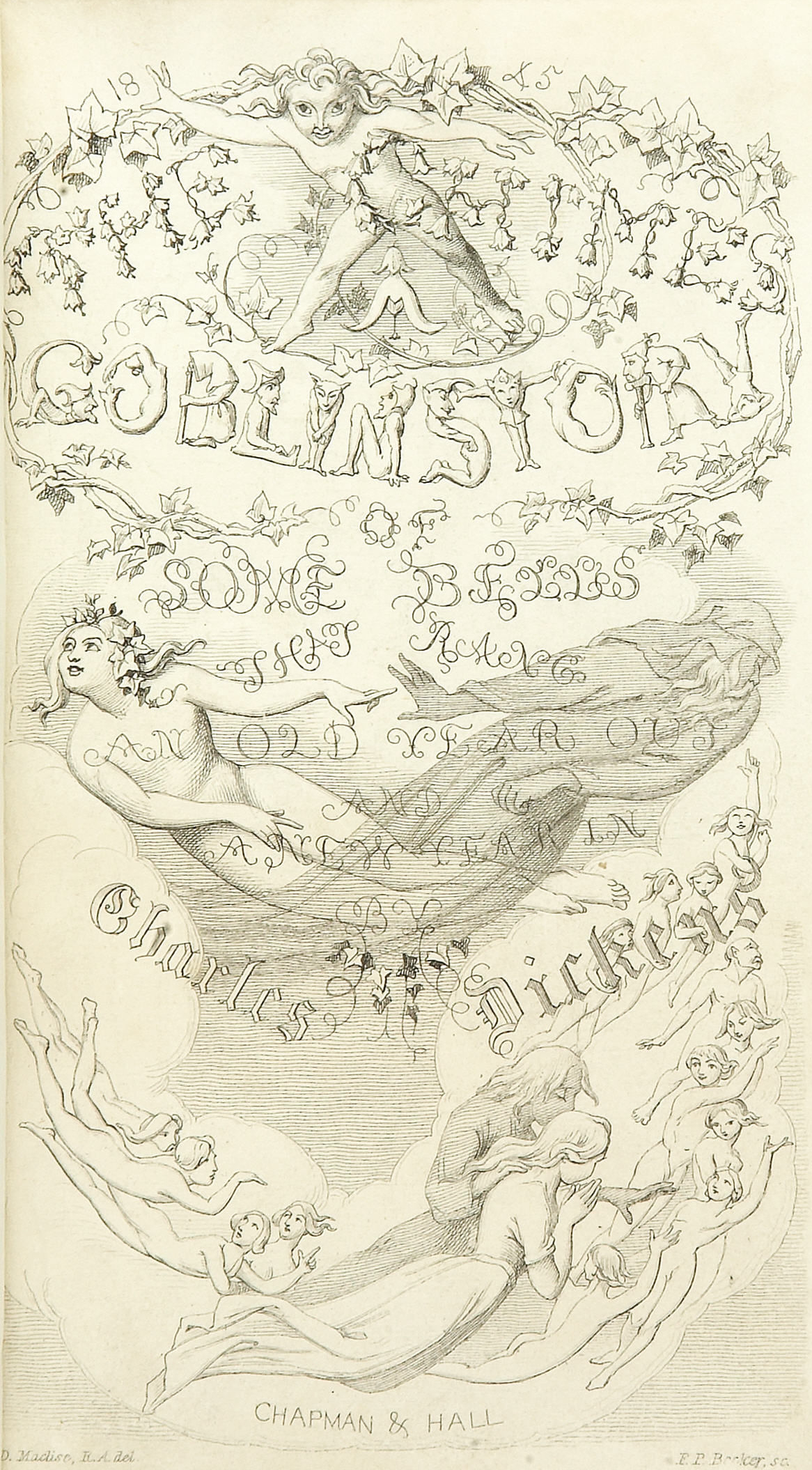
- Title page of first edition, 1844 with engraving by F.P. Becker
- Author: Charles Dickens
- Original title: The Chimes: A Goblin Story of Some Bells that Rang an Old Year Out and a New Year In
- Illustrator: Daniel Maclise; Richard Doyle; John Leech; William Clarkson Stanfield
- Language: English
- Genre: Novella
- Publisher: Chapman & Hall
- Publication date: 1844
- Publication place: England
- Media type: Print
- Pages: 175 pp
- Preceded by: A Christmas Carol
- Followed by: The Cricket on the Hearth

The Chimes: A Goblin Story of Some Bells that Rang an Old Year Out and a New Year In, commonly referred to as The Chimes, is a novella by Charles Dickens, first published in 1844, one year after A Christmas Carol. It is the second in his series of "Christmas books", five novellas with strong social and moral messages that he published during the 1840s. In addition to A Christmas Carol and The Chimes, the Christmas books include The Cricket on the Hearth (1845), The Battle of Life (1846), and The Haunted Man and the Ghost's Bargain (1848).

== Plot ==
Toby ("Trotty") Veck, an elderly "ticket-porter", plies his trade from the steps of a church, whose Chimes have for many years cheered and encouraged him as he trots around delivering letters. Today, on New Year's Eve, Trotty is filled with gloom at reports in the newspapers of working class crime and immorality, and concludes that the poor must be incorrigibly bad by nature.

Trotty's daughter Meg and her long-time fiancé Richard arrive to announce their decision to marry the very next day. Although desperately poor and with few prospects, they see no point in waiting any longer, reasoning that they will otherwise regret in later years the missed opportunity to have cheered and helped each other as husband and wife. The couple's happiness is dispelled by an encounter with Alderman Cute who sanctimoniously lectures them on how they have brought their own misfortunes on themselves, and who promises to ‘Put down’ such people. The couple feel they barely have a right to exist, let alone to marry.

Trotty carries a note from Cute to Sir Joseph Bowley MP, who dispenses charity to the poor in the manner of a paternal dictator. Bowley is ostentatiously settling his debts, and berates Trotty because he is unable to pay a small debt to Mrs Chickenstalker, a local shopkeeper. Returning home, convinced that he and his fellows are naturally ungrateful and have no place in society, Trotty encounters Will Fern, a poor countryman, and his nine-year-old orphaned niece, Lilian. Fern has been accused of vagrancy and Trotty warns that Cute plans to have him arrested. Trotty takes Fern and Lilian home, and he and Meg share their meagre food and poor lodgings. Meg is distressed, and it seems the encounter with Cute has dissuaded her from marrying Richard.

Trotty sits up late with a newspaper and is reinforced in his belief that the working classes are naturally wicked by reading of a poor woman who in desperation has killed both herself and her baby. Suddenly, the Chimes burst violently in on his thoughts, and seem to call him to the church. Climbing to the bellchamber, he discovers a swarming, leaping cloud of dwarf phantoms that vanish as the Chimes cease. Then he sees the dark foreboding goblin figures of the bells. The goblin of the Great Bell berates him for the wrong he has done the Chimes in losing faith in man's destiny to improve.

Trotty sees himself lying dead at the base of the bell tower, and is told that he had fallen and died there nine years ago. Meg's life is to be an object lesson for him: he must "learn from the creature nearest to [his] heart" what pressures there are on the poor. There follows a series of visions in which, helpless to interfere, he is shown the troubled lives of Meg, Richard, Will and Lilian over the subsequent years. Richard descends into alcoholism; Meg eventually marries him in an effort to save him, but he dies ruined, leaving her with a baby; Will is driven in and out of prison; Lilian turns to prostitution and dies of grief. At last, destitute and homeless, Meg is driven to contemplate drowning herself and her child. Trotty breaks down when he sees Meg poised to jump into the river, and cries that he has learned his lesson, that "there is no loving mother on the earth who might not come to this, if such a life had gone before". He finds himself able to catch her dress and prevent her from jumping.

Trotty awakens at home as the Chimes joyfully ring in the New Year on the day of Meg and Richard's wedding. Their friends arrive to provide a surprise feast and celebration. Will and Lilian are warmly greeted by Mrs Chickenstalker, who turns out to be an old friend. The author explicitly invites the reader to decide if this awakening is a dream-within-a-dream. The reader is asked to bear in mind "the stern realities from which these shadows come", and to endeavour to correct, improve, and soften them.

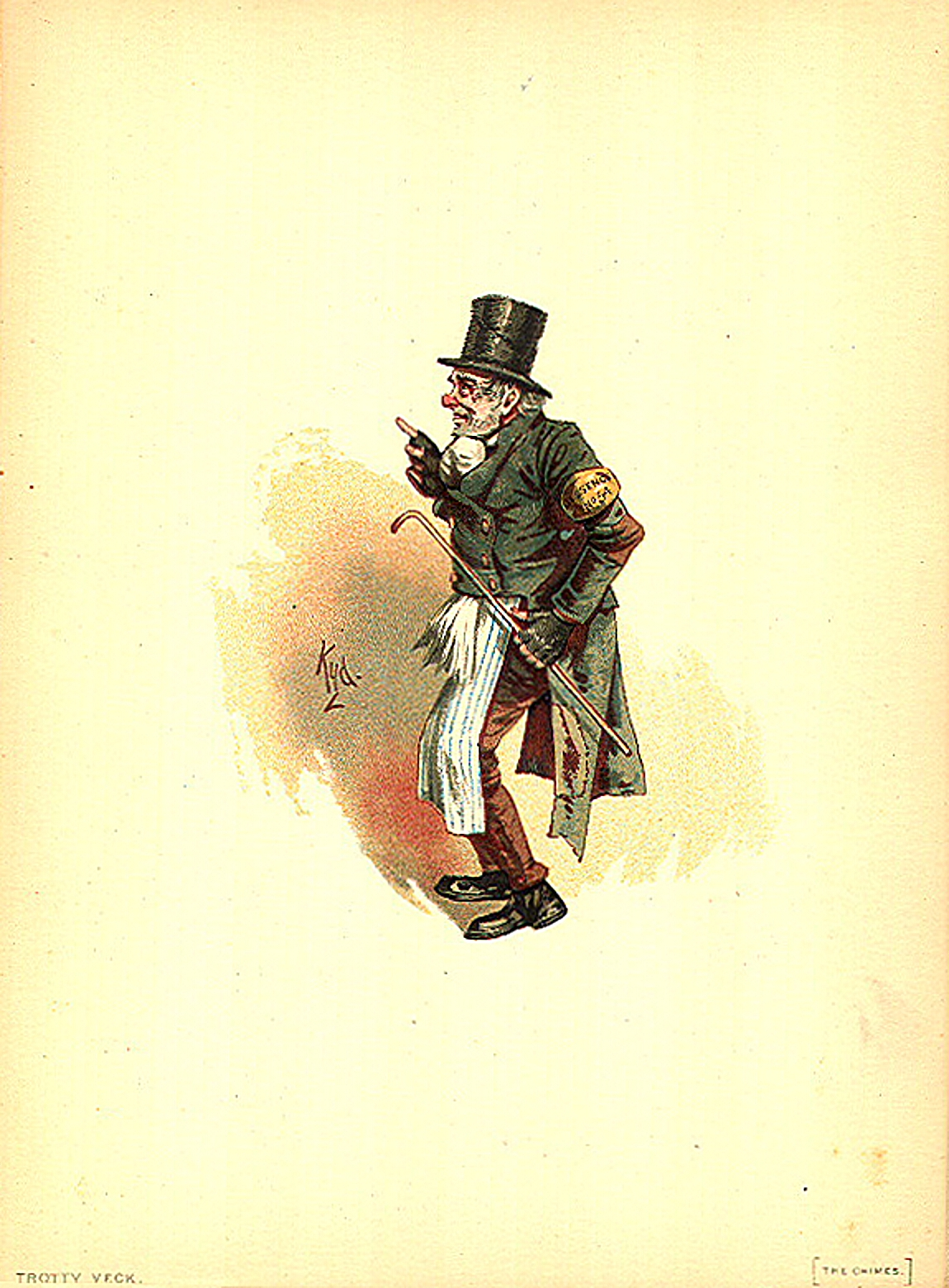
Trotty Veck by Kyd (Joseph Clayton Clarke)

== Principal characters ==
- Toby "Trotty" Veck, the protagonist, a poor elderly messenger or "ticket-porter"
- Margaret "Meg" Veck, Toby's daughter
- Mrs Chickenstalker, a local shopkeeper
- Alderman Cute, a Justice of the Peace
- Sir Joseph Bowley, a rich paternalist MP
- Will Fern, a countryman
- Lilian Fern, Will's orphaned niece

== Development history ==
The book was written in late 1844, during Dickens's year-long visit to Italy. John Forster, his first biographer, records that Dickens, hunting for a title and structure for his next contracted Christmas story, was struck one day by the clamour of the Genoese bells audible from the villa where they were staying.

All Genoa lay beneath him, and up from it, with some sudden set of the wind, came in one fell sound the clang and clash of all its steeples, pouring into his ears, again and again, in a tuneless, grating, discordant, jerking, hideous vibration that made his ideas "spin round and round till they lost themselves in a whirl of vexation and giddiness, and dropped down dead."

Two days later Forster received a letter from Dickens which read simply: "We have heard THE CHIMES at midnight, Master Shallow!", and the writing of the book began. Forster describes Dickens's intentions in writing The Chimes as striking "a blow for the poor".

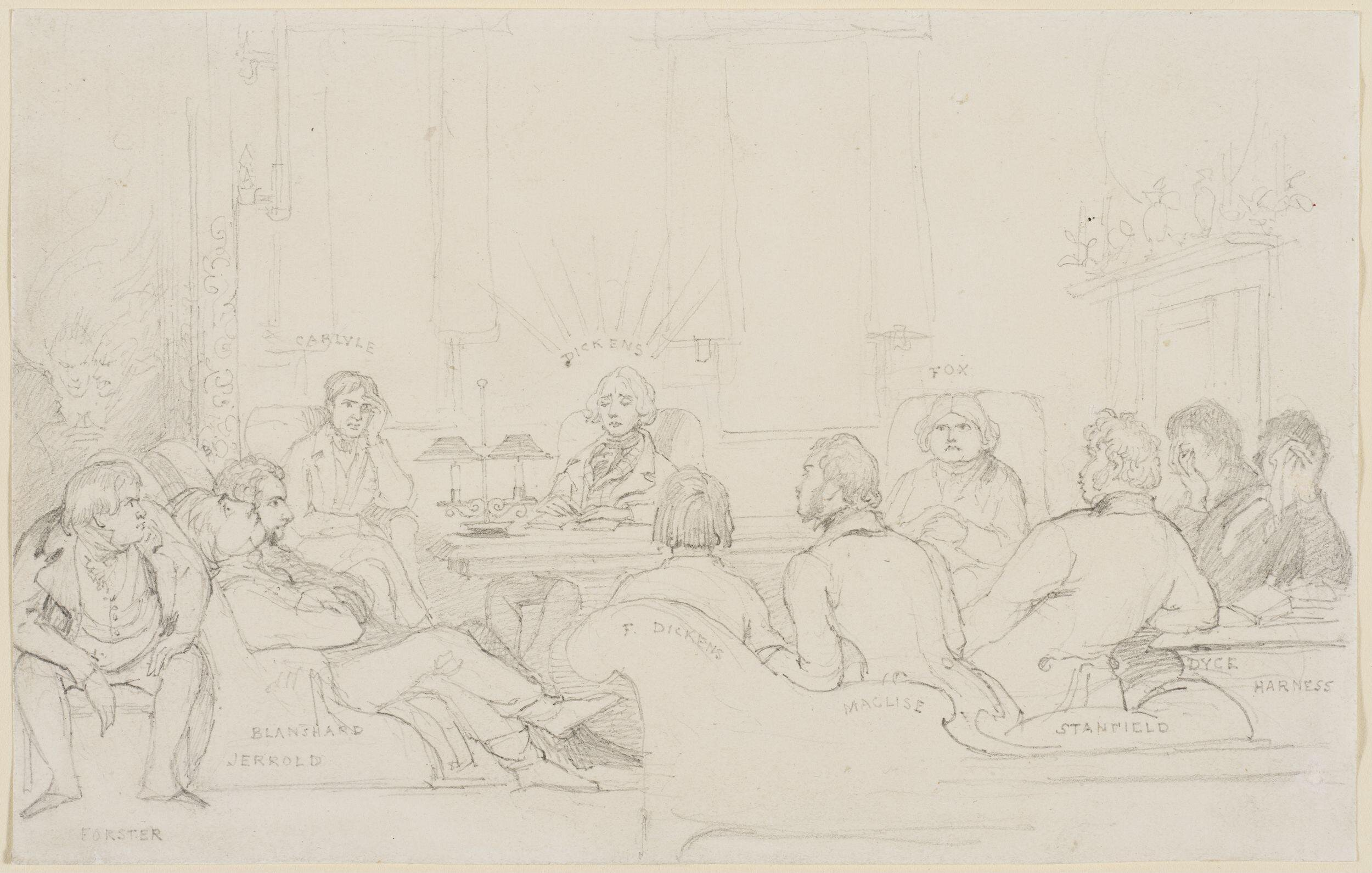
"Charles Dickens reading 'The Chimes' to his friends in John Foster's chambers" by Daniel Maclise

They had always been his clients, they had never been forgotten in any of his books, but here nothing else was to be remembered ... he had come to have as little faith for the putting down of any serious evil, as in a then notorious city alderman's gabble for the putting down of suicide. The latter had stirred his indignation to its depths just before he came to Italy, and his increased opportunities of solitary reflection since had strengthened and extended it. When he came therefore to think of his new story for Christmas time, he resolved to make it a plea for the poor ... He was to try and convert Society, as he had converted Scrooge, by showing that its happiness rested on the same foundations as those of the individual, which are mercy and charity not less than justice.

Dickens returned to London for a week in December 1844 and gave readings of the finished book to friends prior to publication, to judge its impact. The artist Daniel Maclise, who had contributed two illustrations to The Chimes and attended two of these events, portrayed the reading of 3 December 1844 in a well-known sketch.

== Title ==
The chimes are old bells in the church on whose steps Trotty Veck plies his trade. The book is divided into four parts named "quarters", after the quarter chimes of a striking clock. (This parallels Dickens naming the parts of A Christmas Carol "staves" – that is "stanzas" – and dividing The Cricket on the Hearth into "chirps".)

== Literary significance and reception ==
A Christmas Carol had been extremely well received the previous year, and The Chimes aroused public interest and anticipation. Five different stage productions of the book were running within weeks of publication and nearly 20,000 copies were sold in the first three months. It had a high media profile, and was widely reviewed and discussed. Critical opinion was divided; those sympathetic to its social and political message liked the book, but others thought it dangerously radical. The Northern Star reviewer called Dickens "the champion of the poor"; John Bull rejected his unflattering caricatures of philanthropy. It was certainly a financial success for Dickens, and remained popular for many years, although in the long term its fame was eclipsed by that of A Christmas Carol.

== Allusions and references ==
The novel's setting is contemporary and the 1840s (the "Hungry Forties") were a time of social and political unrest.

Trotty's conviction that poor people are naturally wicked is influenced by an article in his newspaper about a young woman who has tried to drown herself and her child, and this motif returns at the climax of the book, when Meg is driven to contemplate the same course of action. This is a reference to Mary Furley, a destitute young woman sentenced to death in 1844 for infanticide after her desperation not to return to the workhouse led to a suicide attempt in which her child drowned. This case caused great public debate in the late spring of 1844. Dickens took part in the general outcry against the sentence, which was eventually commuted to transportation. Among other works inspired by the Furley case is Thomas Hood's poem The Bridge of Sighs.

Alderman Cute is a parody of Sir Peter Laurie, a Middlesex magistrate, alderman and former Lord Mayor of London, known for his determination to "put down" the lower classes and their antisocial behaviour.

== Adaptations ==
In 1914, the book was made into a silent film, The Chimes, directed by Thomas Bentley.

King Features Syndicate distributed a comic strip adaptation of the story as a two-week limited series at Christmastime in 1938.

A musical adaptation of The Chimes was created in 1992 by Lisa Kofod and Gay Donat Reed, with music by Paul Johnson. A staged reading of this work was produced at The Workhouse Theatre in New York City.

The Chimes was adapted into a 24-minute clay-animated film in 2000 by Xyzoo Animation. It won a Cine Special Jury award in 2002.

The Colonial Radio Theatre in Boston produced a full cast radio production of The Chimes in 2000. This was released on CD by Blackstone Audio in 2007, and re-released by Brilliance Audio in 2011.

In 2004, a stage adaptation by Les Smith premiered at the Southwark Playhouse.

In 2015, Audible issued The Chimes as a free audible book with Christmas well wishes from the company to its subscribers.

In 2022, Average Romp released The Chimes as a full-cast audio dramatisation starring Toby Jones as Toby Veck.

== See also ==
- List of Christmas-themed literature
