= Peter Laurie =

British politician

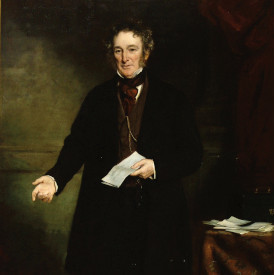
Sir Peter Laurie

Sir Peter Laurie (3 March 1778 – 3 December 1861) was a British politician who served as Lord Mayor of London.

He was appointed Sheriff of the City of London for 1823 and elected Lord Mayor for 1832. From 1838 until his death, he was Chairman of the Union Bank of London. He also worked as a saddler, who supplied saddles for the Indian army, and wrote two books on prison reform. He was knighted in 1824 and is buried in the western section of Highgate Cemetery.

== Life ==
Sir Peter Laurie (3 March 1778 – 3 December 1861), lord mayor of London, was the son of John Laurie, a small landowner and agriculturist, of Stichill, Roxburghshire. He was at first intended for the ministry of the established church of Scotland, and learned Latin in Haddington Grammar School. His mother died in 1784, and he didn't get on well with his stepmother to the extent that he left home at the age of 12 to join his brother in Jedburgh. Here, and later in Edinburgh, after another disagreement, he learned the saddler's trade.

He came to London as a lad to seek his fortune. He obtained a clerkship in the office of John Jack, whose daughter Margaret he afterwards married, and subsequently set up for himself as a saddler, carrying on business at 296 Oxford Street. Becoming a contractor for the Indian army, he rapidly made his fortune, and in 1820 he took his sons into partnership; he himself retired from the business in 1827. He was chairman of the Union Bank from its foundation in 1839 until his death. In 1823, he served the office of sheriff, and on 7 April 1824 received the honour of knighthood. On 6 July 1826, he was chosen alderman for the ward of Aldersgate. In 1831, he contested the election for the mayoralty with Sir John Key, who was put forward for re-election. Laurie was defeated, but served the office in the following year in the ordinary course of seniority. He was master of the Saddlers' Company in 1833.

During his mayoralty and throughout his public life, Laurie devoted himself largely to schemes of social advancement. He gained the reputation of being a good magistrate and took an active part in the proceedings of the court of common council, where he showed himself a disciple of Joseph Hume. In 1825, he succeeded in throwing open to the public the meetings of the court of Middlesex magistrates, and in 1835, the meetings of the court of aldermen were also held in public through his endeavours. He was president of Bridewell and Bethlehem Hospitals, and a magistrate and deputy-lieutenant for the city of Westminster and the county of Middlesex. His town residence was situated in Park Square, Regent's Park, where he died of old age and infirmity on 3 December 1861. He was buried in the western section of Highgate cemetery on 10 December. Laurie had no children and was left a widower in 1847.

== Obituary ==
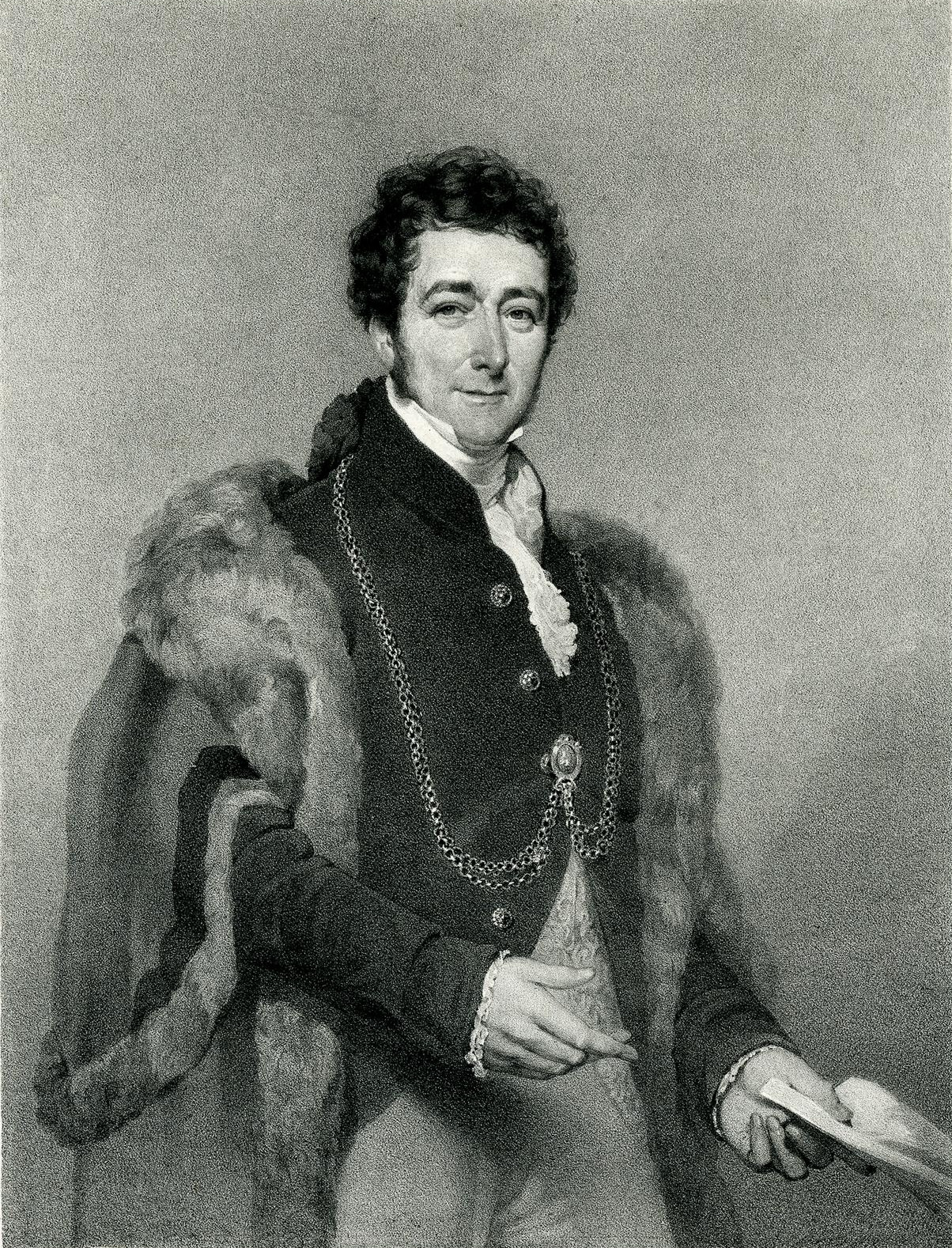
cropped print of Peter Laurie

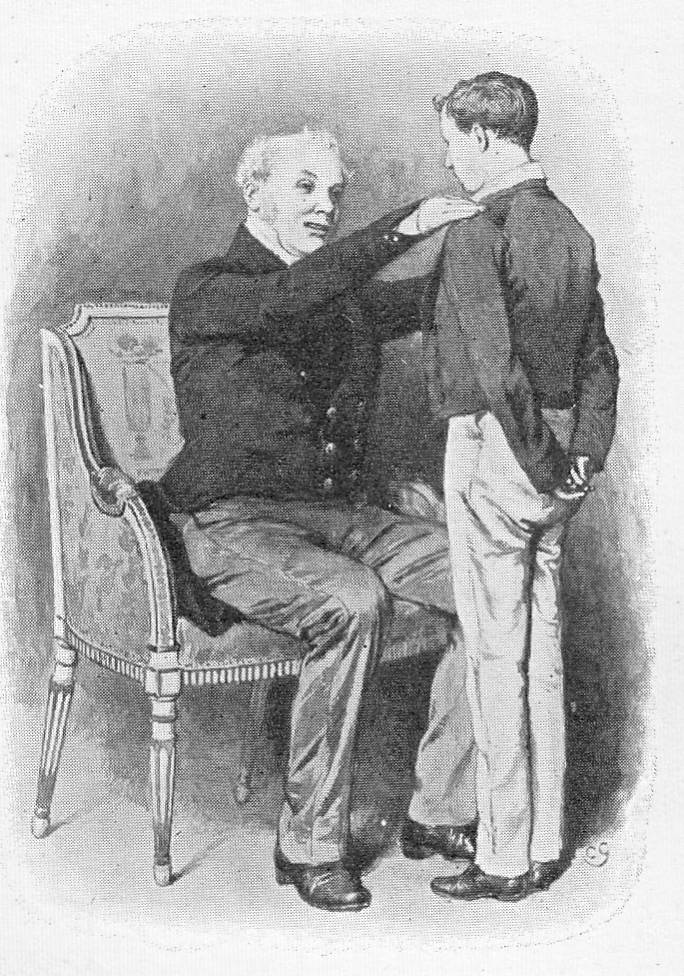
Alderman Cute and the Heir to Bowley. Alderman Cute was a character from Charles Dickens' The Chimes and was based on Peter Laurie. Laurie's remarks on the 1844 Mary Furley case have been cited as one inspiration to Dickens to write The Chimes.

The deceased was a son of the late Mr John Laurie, a plain man who lived upon his own lands at Stichill, Roxburghshire, and who earned a competency as a small agriculturist. At Stichill, Peter Laurie was born, but little is known of his early youth, except that he was originally destined for the ministry of the Established Church of Scotland. One thing, however, is certain, which is that he resolved to turn his steps southwards and to seek his fortunes in London. Arriving in London, with but few pounds and fewer friends, he applied himself in earnest to business; and having filled a clerk’s place in a saddler’s counting-house, and having married the daughter of his employer, set up on his own account as a merchant. Eventually, he rose to become a large contractor for the Indian army, and so thoroughly did he prosper in this business that he was enabled to retire, while still comparatively a young man, from active commercial engagements with something more than a competency. He was elected to serve the office of Sheriff of London and Middlesex in 1823 and was chosen Alderman of Aldersgate Ward in 1826. He held the office of Lord Mayor in 1832-33.

The police annals of the City in 1855 disclosed a remarkable series of frauds on the part of Davidson and Gordon, who, by means of fictitious warrants and other gross impositions, had practised to an enormous extent upon the credulous confidence of the public. To prevent these celebrated culprits from escaping by means of any technical plea, Sir Peter Laurie insisted on having the case placed in the hands of the City Solicitor, so that wholesale swindling should not triumph against the cause of justice. The investigation of these frauds occupied no less than twelve sittings before the criminals were sent for trial to the Old Bailey.

Sir Peter Laurie led a public life of great value to the interests of philanthropy and social advancement, and filled a variety of offices (such as the Presidency of the Bethlehem and Bridewell Hospitals), which enabled him to take an active part in many of the leading movements of the day. Among these, the claims of art and those of Christian missions were not forgotten. The late Alderman was one of the originators of the Wilkie Memorial and has presided on more than one occasion at the annual meetings of the Wesleyan Missionary Society.

Sir Peter Laurie was a magistrate and deputy-lieutenant for the city of Westminster and for the county of Middlesex, and a Commissioner of Lieutenancy for London. He married Margaret, daughter of John Jack, Esq., but was left a widower, without issue, in 1847.

His health, which had long been feeble, grew sensibly worse in the week before his death, while he was staying at Brighton. On 1 December, he was brought up thence to London, in spite of the remonstrances of his friends, who feared that he would die upon the road: but he was resolved, in his own words, "to die at home." And he had his wish, for he had reached his house less than forty-eight hours before he ceased to breathe.

The remains of the deceased Alderman were deposited in the cemetery at Highgate on Tuesday, 10 December, his funeral being attended by several members of the Aldermanic body.

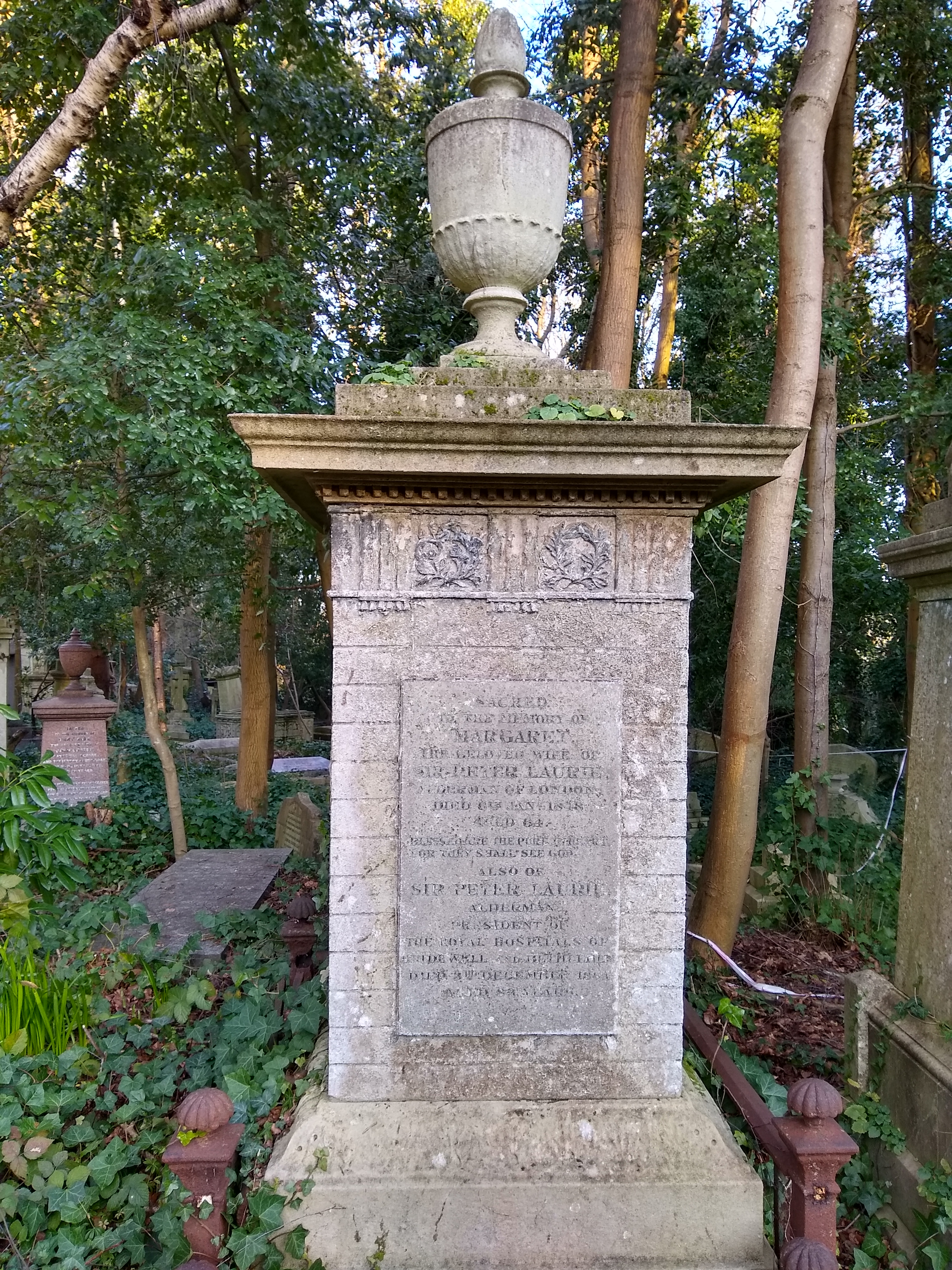
Grave of Sir Peter Laurie in Highgate Cemetery (west)

== Portrait ==
There is a mezzotint portrait of him engraved by James Scott from a painting by Thomas Philipps, R.A., and published in 1839; and an inferior lithographic print from a drawing by F. Cruikshank was published by Hullmandel. A portrait by an unknown painter, presented to him by the company on 24 Feb. 1835, hangs in Saddlers' Hall. A painting by John Phillip is located in John Muir House in Haddington.

== Publications ==
- 1. 'Maxims ...,' 12mo, London, 1833.
- 2. 'Substance of Speech of Sir P. Laurie on the Question of the Periodical Election of Magistrates in the Court of Common Council,' 28 March, privately printed, 8vo, London, 1835.
- 3. 'Correspondence between C. Cator ... and Sir P. L. upon the Minutes of the Court of Common Council,' 8vo [1839].
- 4. 'Speech ... at the Public Breakfast of the Wesleyan Missionary Society,' pp. 8, 8vo, London, 1843.
- 5. 'Killing no Murder, or the Effects of Separate Confinement ...,' 8vo, London, 1846.
- 6. 'A Letter on the Disadvantages and Extravagances of the Separate System of Prison Discipline for County Gaols ...,' 8vo, London, 1848.

== Bibliography ==
- Laurie, Peter G. (1901). Sir Peter Laurie: a family memoir. Brentwood: Wilson and Whitworth.
- Grant, James (1841). Portraits of public characters, by the author of Random recollections of the Lords and Commons. Vol. 1. London: Saunders and Otley. pp. 120-153.
- Townsend's Calendar of Knights
- City Press, 7 Dec. 1861
- Gent. Mag. 1862, pt. i. pp. 91–3
- Sherwell's Historical Account of the Saddlers' Company, 1889
- Catalogues of the British Museum and the Guildhall Library

== See also ==
- The Chimes, a Dickensian parody of Laurie's political positions.
