= Pamela Bianco =

British-born American painter and prodigy

- Born: 31 December 1906; Barnes, London, U.K.
- Died: 1994
- Spouses: Robert Schlick (m. 1930; div. 1955) George Theodore Hartmann (m. 1955; died 1976)
- Children: Lorenzo Bianco Schlick
- Parents: Francesco Bianco; Margery Williams

Signature
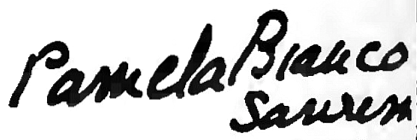

Pamela Bianco (December 31, 1906 – 1994) was a British-born American painter, illustrator, and writer, who came to fame as a child prodigy in the 1910s.

== Early life and education ==
Pamela Ruby Bianco was born on New Year's Eve in the Barnes district of London, the daughter of an Italian scholar and bookseller, Francesco Bianco, and an English writer, Margery Williams Bianco (author of The Velveteen Rabbit). She was educated at home, though home for the Biancos was a shifting location, as the family lived in France, Italy, and the United States when Pamela was a child.

Her paintings and drawings were first exhibited as part of a children's show in Turin, then in London in 1918, and in New York City in 1921. After shows in several American cities, she returned to New York City for a more mature show when she was seventeen years old, at the Knoedler Gallery. Among her early patrons were John Galsworthy, Walter de la Mare, Gertrude Vanderbilt Whitney, Nina Wilcox Putnam, and Jo Davidson.

== Career ==
Bianco continued to exhibit her works into her twenties, in New York City and elsewhere.

After Bianco had an exhibit at Leicester Galleries in London in 1919, Walter de la Mare wrote some poems to accompany her drawings which was published as Flora: A Book of Drawings by William Heinemann the same year. In 1928 a children's edition of poems from William Blake's Songs of Innocence, selected and illustrated by Bianco, was published.

In her adult career, she wrote and illustrated children's literature, and continued to exhibit her art. Books written and illustrated by Bianco include The Starlit Journey: A Story (1933) and Playtime in Cherry Street (1948). Books illustrated by Bianco include Oscar Wilde's The Birthday of the Infanta (1929), Glenway Wescott's Natives of Rock (1925), and Hazeltine and Smith's The Easter Book of Legends and Stories (1947). She also illustrated several books by her mother, including The Skin Horse, The Adventures of Andy, and The Little Wooden Doll.

Bianco received a Guggenheim Fellowship in 1930.

== Personal life and legacy ==
Bianco married twice. Her first husband was Robert Schlick; they married in 1930 and divorced in 1955. She remarried in 1955 to fellow artist George Theodore Hartmann; he died in 1976. She had one son, Lorenzo Bianco Schlick, who became a dancer best known for appearing in Fiddler on the Roof on Broadway and in the film version. Larry Bianco (as he was known professionally) died in April 1994, and Bianco died later that same year, at the age of 88.

A retrospective exhibition of Bianco's works was mounted in 2004 in London at England & Co Gallery and an exhibition catalogue published. A small collection of her papers, mostly illustrations, are at the University of Minnesota.

In 2017 Laurel Davis Huber published The Velveteen Daughter: A Novel based on the life of Bianco.

Works by Bianco are in the collections of the Art Institute of Chicago, the Museum of Modern Art, the Brooklyn Museum, the Whitney Museum of Art, and the Carnegie Museum of Art, among other institutions and private collections.

== Drawings by Pamela Bianco ==
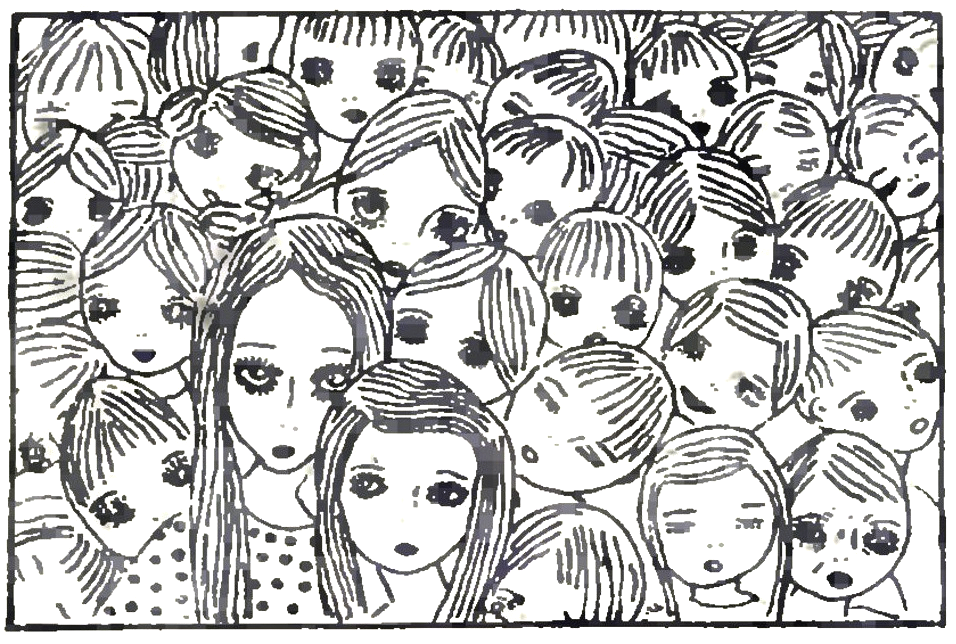

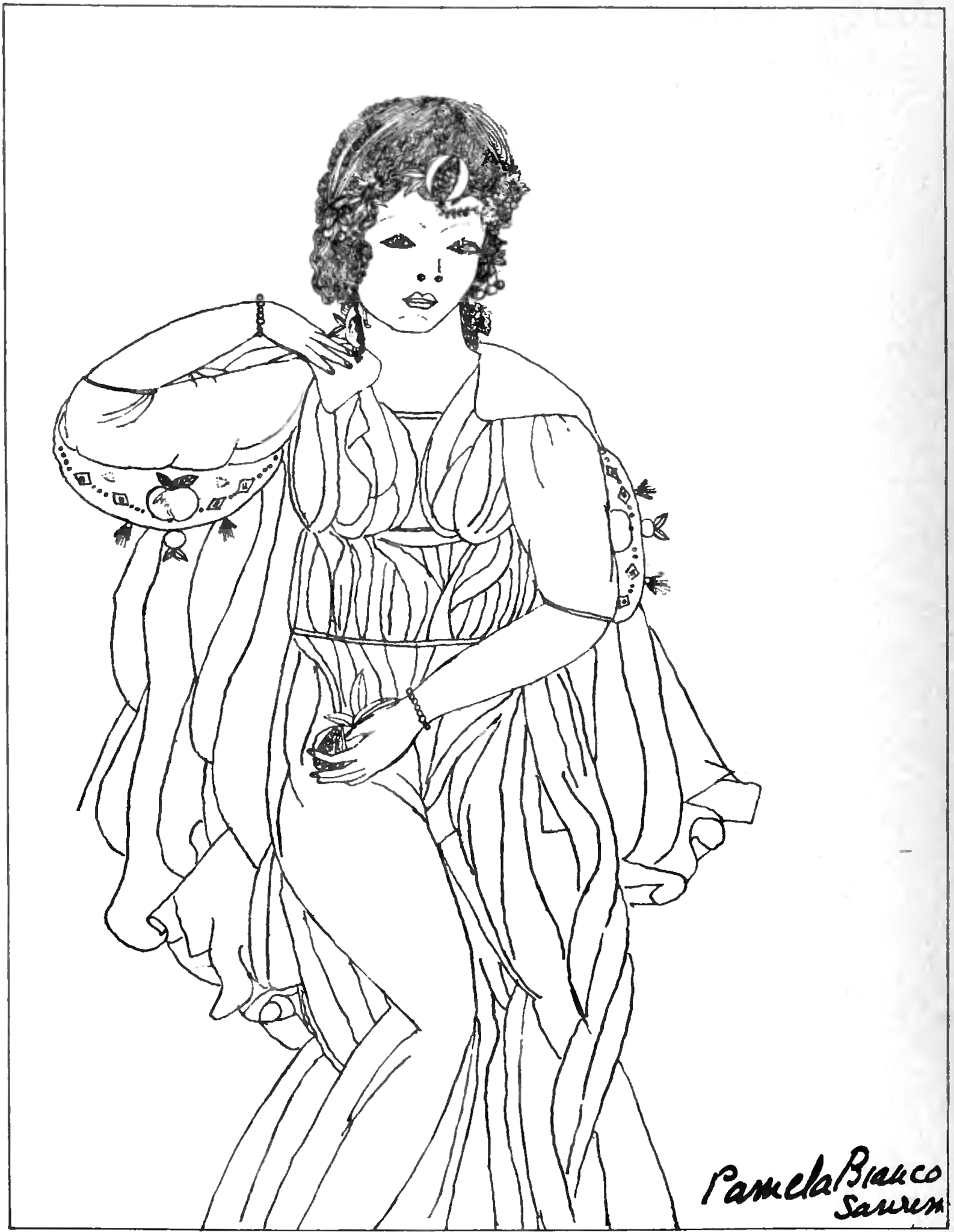

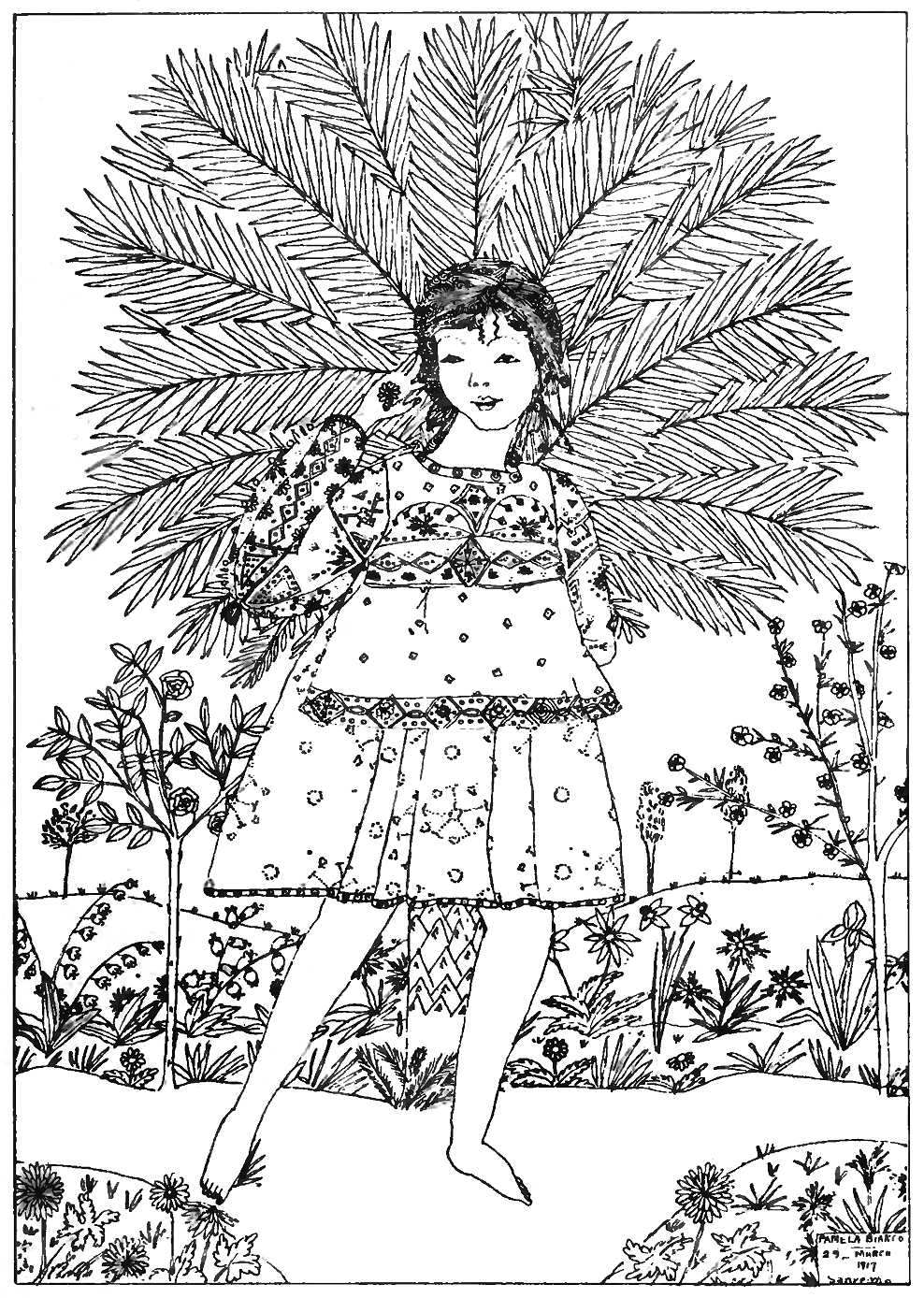

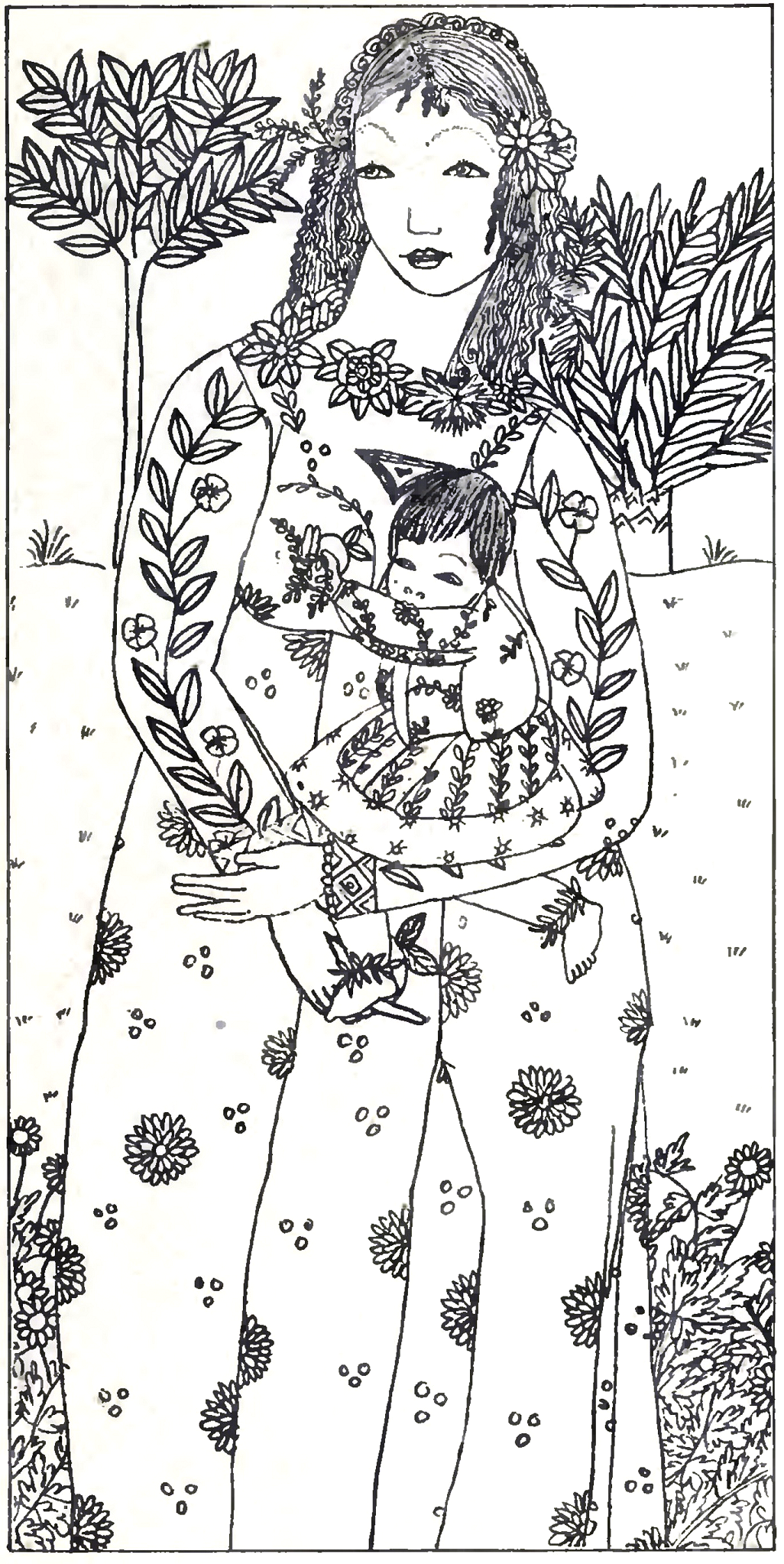

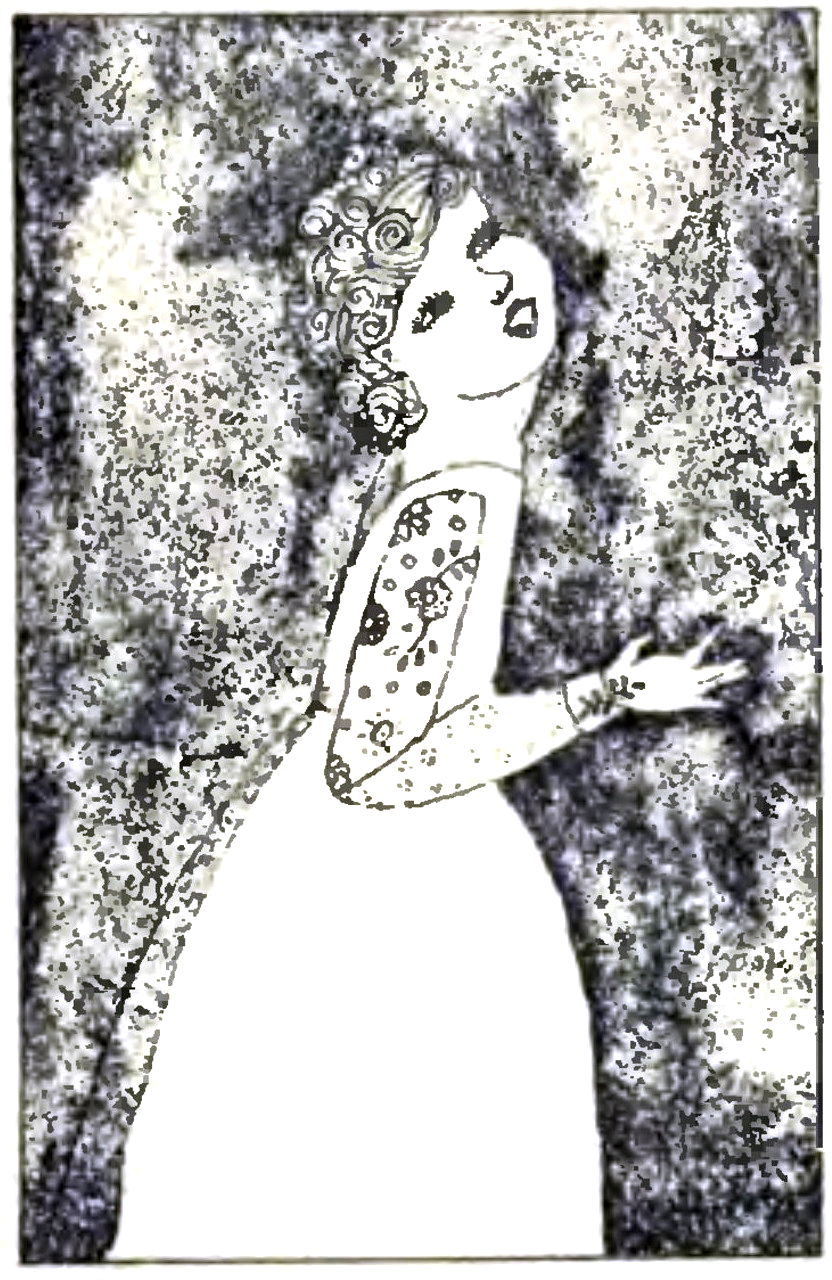

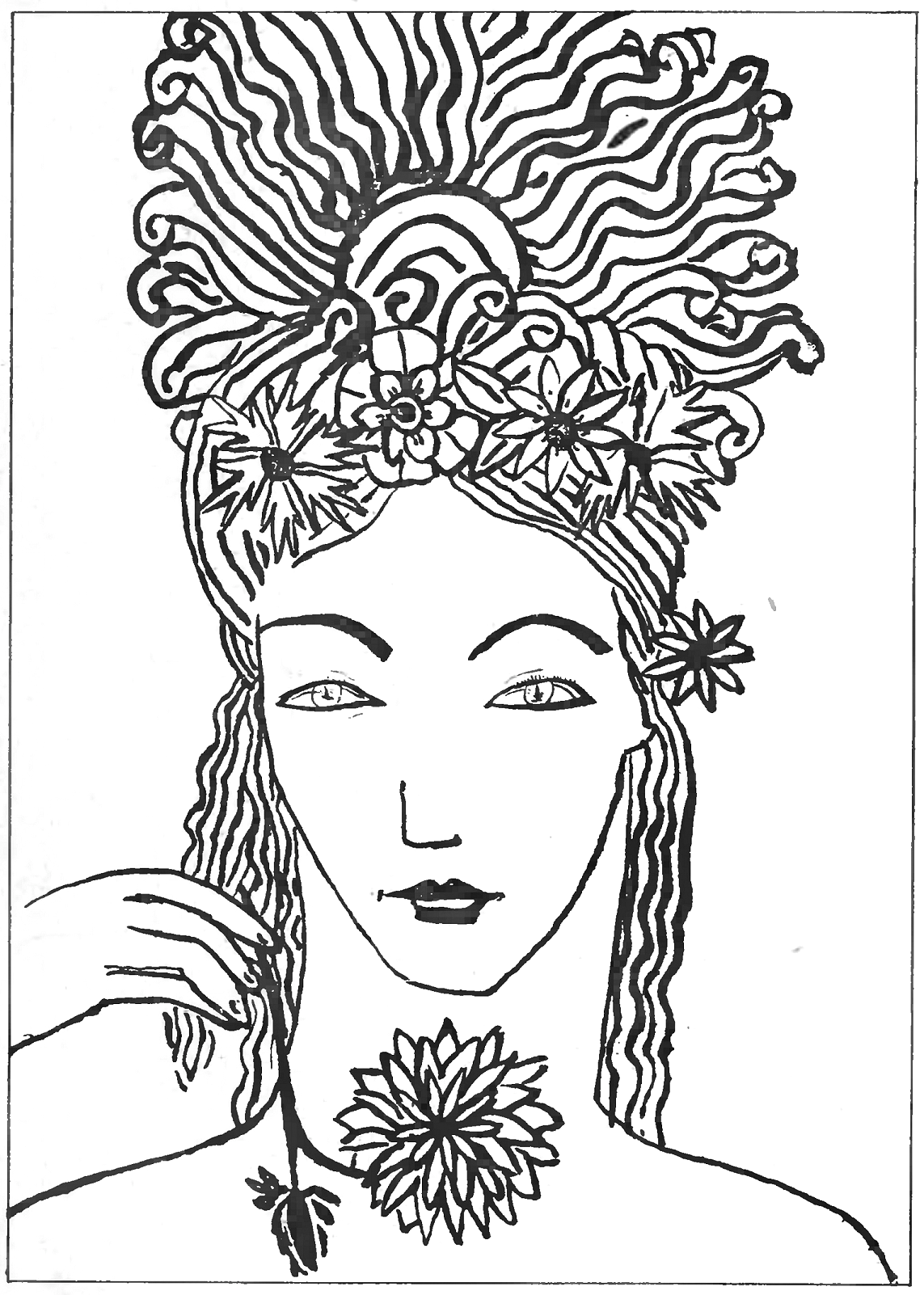
