= The Velveteen Rabbit =

1922 children's novel by Margery Williams

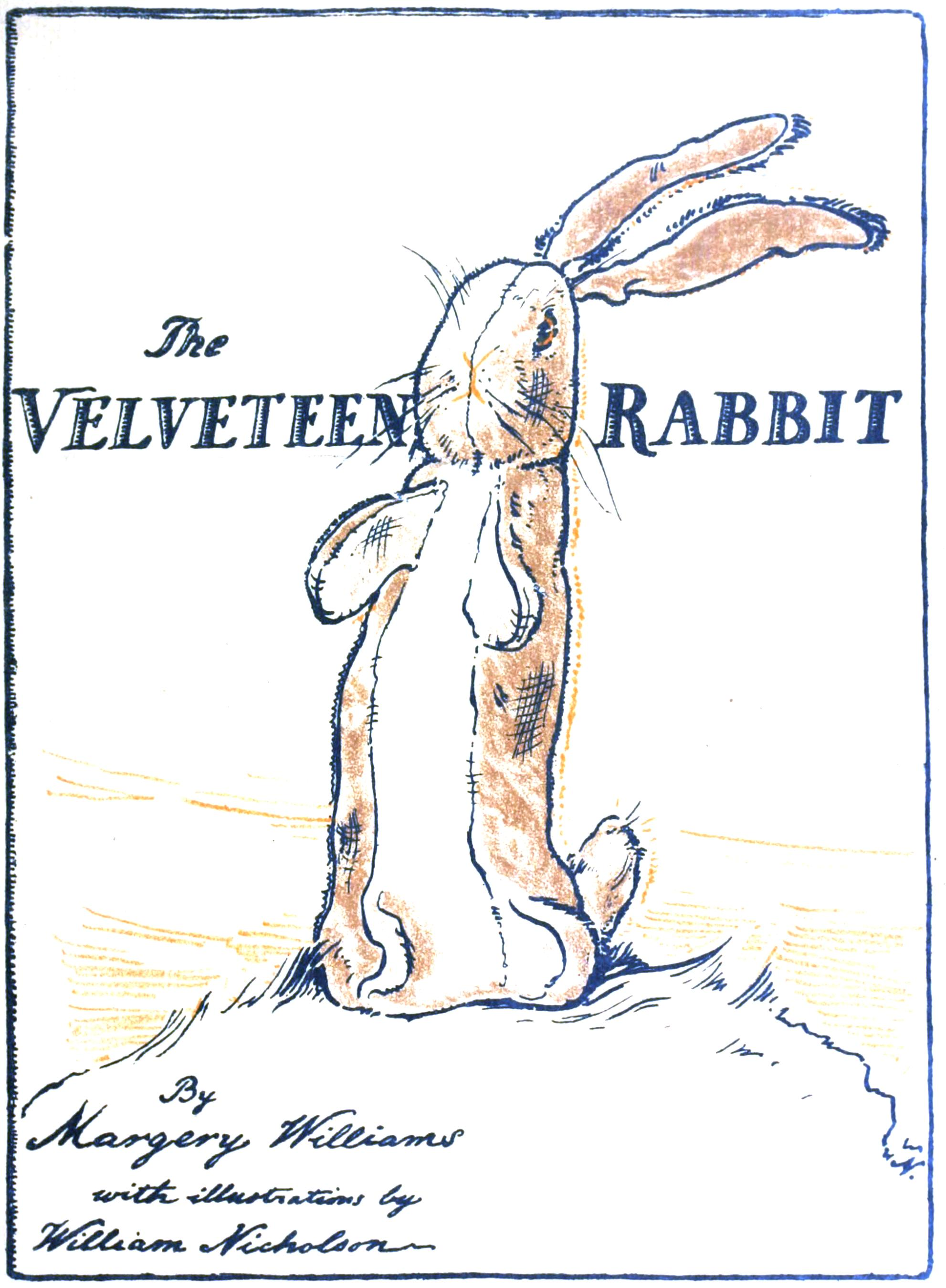
- Front cover of the 1922 Heinemann edition
- Author: Margery Williams
- Illustrator: William Nicholson
- Language: English
- Genre: Children's novel
- Publisher: George H. Doran Company
- Publication date: 1922
- Publication place: United Kingdom
- ISBN: 0-380-00255-8
- OCLC: 3690897
- Text: The Velveteen Rabbit at Wikisource

The Velveteen Rabbit (or How Toys Become Real) is a British children's book written by Margery Williams (also known as Margery Williams Bianco) and illustrated by William Nicholson. It chronicles the story of a stuffed rabbit's desire to become real through the love of his owner. The story was first published in Harper's Bazaar in 1921 featuring illustrations from Williams' daughter Pamela Bianco. It was published as a book in 1922 and has been republished many times since.

The Velveteen Rabbit was Williams' first children's book. It has been awarded the IRA/CBC Children's Choice award. Based on a 2007 online poll, the National Education Association voted the book #28 on the "Teachers' Top 100 Books for Children".

== Plot summary ==
A stuffed rabbit sewn from velveteen is given as a Christmas present to a small boy. The wisest and oldest toy in the nursery is the Skin Horse, which was owned by the boy's uncle, and who tells the rabbit about toys being made real by the love of children: "Real isn't how you are made... It's a thing that happens to you. When a child loves you for a long, long time - not just to play with, but REALLY loves you - then you become Real". The rabbit is awed by this idea, but feels his chances of achieving this wish are slight due to the boy forgetting about him in favor of playing with his newer, more modern and mechanical toys.

One night, the boy's nanny gives the rabbit to the boy to sleep with in place of a lost toy. The rabbit becomes the boy's favorite toy and the boy eventually begins to regard the rabbit as real. Time passes and the rabbit becomes older and shabbier, but remains happy. He meets some real rabbits in the summer, who tell him that he is not a real rabbit upon learning that he cannot hop as they do.

One day, the boy comes down with scarlet fever, and the rabbit sits with him as he recovers. The doctor orders that the boy should be taken to the seaside and that his room should be disinfected and all his books and toys burnt, including the velveteen rabbit, to prevent further spread of the disease. The rabbit is bundled into a sack and left out in the garden overnight, where he reflects sadly on his life with his boy. As the rabbit cries, a real tear drops onto the ground, and a flower appears. A fairy steps out of the flower and comforts the velveteen rabbit, introducing herself as the Nursery Magic Fairy who takes discarded children's toys and turns them real. She explains that because the rabbit has become real to the boy, who truly loves him, she will take him away with her and "turn him Real" to everyone.

The fairy takes the velveteen rabbit to the forest and kisses him, whereupon he becomes a real rabbit and joins the other rabbits in the forest. The next spring, the rabbit returns to look at the boy, and the boy muses that the rabbit in his garden looks just like his lost rabbit toy.

== Adaptations ==
The following adaptations have been made of The Velveteen Rabbit:

- In 1973, LSB Productions made the classic, original 16 mm film version (running time: 19 minutes). It won the Chris Plaque Award, the Silver Plaque Award, and the Golden Babe Award, and it appeared at the Columbus Film Festival, the Chicago International Film Festival, and the Chicagoland Film Festival. It was a finalist at the American Film Festival. This film has been on TV and has been acclaimed by parents and teachers worldwide.
- In 1976, Rankin/Bass television special The First Easter Rabbit adapted the plot of the book as first of part of its story of how a toy bunny is recruited as the Easter Bunny.
- In 1984, it was part of the Enchanted Musical Playhouse series, where Marie Osmond played the part of the Velveteen Rabbit. Songs were composed by the Sherman Brothers.
- In 1985, The Velveteen Rabbit was adapted into a video recording and soundtrack by Rabbit Ears Productions with Random House Video. It is narrated by Meryl Streep, with music by George Winston. It received a Parents' Choice Award for Multimedia and was nominated for a Grammy Award.
- In 1985, two different animated adaptations were made at almost the same time:
  - The first, narrated by Christopher Plummer, was produced in Canada by Atkinson Film-Arts for CTV. This version aired in the United States on HBO. In this version, the boy is given the rabbit for his birthday instead of Christmas.
  - The second was produced by Hanna-Barbera Australia and broadcast as an ABC Weekend Special.
- In 1987, Don Bluth worked on an adaptation of The Velveteen Rabbit, to have been released by New Line Cinema, but the project was never completed. Animation stills can be found online.
- In 2003, it was adapted into a clay-animated film by Xyzoo Animation.
- In 2007, a live-action short film adaptation was released by Horse Fly Studios. It was nominated for two Young Artist Awards.
- In 2009, Feature Films for Families, Family1 Films and Believe Pictures released their live-action/animated feature film called The Velveteen Rabbit. The film was directed by Michael Landon Jr. and stars Jane Seymour, Tom Skerritt, Ellen Burstyn, and Matthew Harbour. It is distributed by Anchor Bay Entertainment, Thomas Nelson and Vision Films. The film adaptation was illegally telemarketed to over 500,000 telephone subscribers in the United States. Verizon successfully sued Feature Films for Families for the practice.
- In 2013, HENHQ produced a musical adaptation of 'The Velveteen Rabbit' by Gerard Margetson (Script) and Jye Bryant (Music, Lyrics & Orchestration) at Windsor Function Centre.
- In 2014, Cat & Hutch produced a storytelling adaptation of The Velveteen Rabbit at Fulham Library for Hammersmith & Fulham ArtsFest. They then went on to perform this at various schools, libraries and other venues across London. In 2021, they adapted this version into an online storytelling over Zoom for various London libraries.
- In October 2015, Atlantic Theater Company produced a new musical adaptation of The Velveteen Rabbit at The Linda Gross Theater. This production was adapted by Anya Saffir (book and lyrics) and Cormac Bluestone (book, lyrics, music).
- For many years ODC/Dance has performed in the San Francisco Bay Area a narrated contemporary dance adaptation of The Velveteen Rabbit with fanciful costumes, typically during the holiday season.
- In 2023, a 40-minute Christmas special of the same name was produced by Magic Light Pictures and released on 22 November by Apple TV+. It was written by Tom Bidwell and directed by Jennifer Perrott and Rick Thiele. It features Phoenix Laroche and the voices of Alex Lawther, Helena Bonham Carter and Nicola Coughlan.
- The independent film production company Storybook Studio began production of a new animated film adaptation of the book, written and directed by John Patrick. The film features narration by Gabi Smedra and stars child actor Hudson Edwards as the Velveteen Rabbit, Maureen Russell as the Nursery Magic Fairy, Therese Kincade as Nana and Paul Fowles as the Skin Horse. The film was slated to be released during the year 2022, in honor of the 100th anniversary of the original book's publication. But because of production complications, the release was pushed back to Easter of 2029.
