= 76 99 =

Studio album by Prodigal Son
- Released: June 12, 2012
- Genre: Reggae, gospel
- Length: 1:13:26
- Label: Radikal Yawd/VPAL

76 99 is a studio album by the Jamaican singer Prodigal Son, released on June 12, 2012 through Radikal Yawd/VPAL.

He launched this album on June 2, 2012 at Freedom Fest in Kingston, Jamaica.

After closing a distribution deal with VPAL for this album, he says "There is no limit to what we are looking at. We are at the baby stage. I give God thanks. It's a humbling experience. I hope this can open doors, not just for me, but for other Caribbean and Jamaican gospel musicians. If I represent well, then they will start looking at other people. This is definitely a good boost for my career. I am making giant steps and I thank God for this opportunity," in an interview with THE STAR.

== Track listing ==
No.	Title	Length
1.	"76 99"	2:53
2.	"Hot Fi You"	3:34
3.	"Wait a Bit"	2:21
4.	"Bible in the Air"	3:28
5.	"How We Praises"	3:36
6.	"Up Up and Away"	4:42
7.	"Loyalty"	3:07
8.	"Rhymes"	3:07
9.	"Coconut Oil"	2:36
10.	"My Shoes"	4:10
11.	"Push On"	3:03
12.	"Jah Carry Me Over"	3:12
13.	"Born in Sin"	3:06
14.	"Love Me Like This"	3:56
15.	"More More More"	5:05
16.	"Let It Run"	4:48
17.	"Heart Surgery"	4:17
18.	"Date With Destiny"	2:43
19.	"Living Water"	3:38
20.	"Stay Right Here"	6:04
Total length:		1:13:26
