= Return of the Prodigal Son (disambiguation) =

The Return of the Prodigal Son is a parable of Jesus in the Bible.

Return of the Prodigal Son may also refer to:

- The Return of the Prodigal Son (Murillo), a painting by Bartolomé Esteban Murillo
- The Return of the Prodigal Son (Rembrandt), a painting
- The Return of the Prodigal Son, a painting by Pompeo Batoni
- The Return of the Prodigal Son (album) by Stanley Turrentine, 1967
- The Return of the Prodigal Son, a 2013 album by Axe Murder Boyz/Young Wicked
- The Return of the Prodigal Son (1966 film), a Czech drama film
- The Return of the Prodigal Son (1976 film), an Egyptian drama film
- "Return of the Prodigal Son" (Law & Order: Special Victims Unit), 2021
- Le retour de l'enfant prodigue (The Return of the Prodigal Son), a 1907 short story by André Gide

== See also ==
- The Prodigal Son (disambiguation)
- Return of the Prodigal Sunn, a 2005 album by Sunz of Man
- Return of the Prodigal (Cui Jian album), 1984
