= Lost Son =

Lost Son or The Lost Son may refer to:

- The Lost Son (film), a 1999 crime drama
- The Lost Sons, a 2021 American-British documentary film
- Lost Son (novel), a 2007 novel by M. Allen Cunningham
- Lost Son (parable), or the Parable of the Prodigal Son, a parable of Jesus in the Bible
- Lost Son, a 1999 album by Richmond Fontaine
- "Lost Son", an episode of CSI: Miami

== See also ==
- Parable of the Lost Coin
- Parable of the Lost Sheep
- The Prodigal Son (disambiguation)
