= Margery Williams =

American novelist

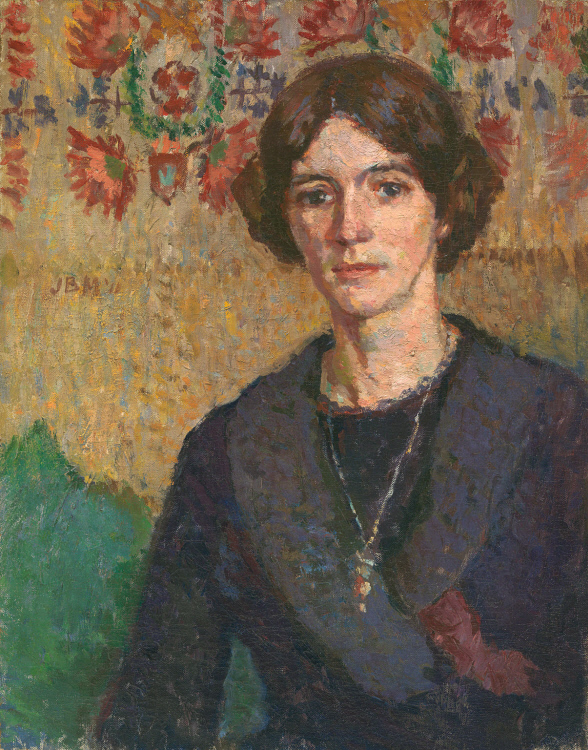
- Portrait of Margery Williams, 1911 at National Portrait Gallery
- Born: 22 July 1881; London, UK
- Died: 4 September 1944 (aged 63)
- Citizenship: United States
- Occupation: Writer
- Spouse: Francesco Bianco
- Children: Cecco Bianco; Pamela Bianco
- Writing career
- Genre: Children's literature
- Notable works: The Velveteen Rabbit; Winterbound
- Notable awards: Newbery Honor; 1937

Margery Williams Bianco (22 July 1881 – 4 September 1944) was an English-American author, primarily of popular children's books. A professional writer since the age of 19, she achieved lasting fame at 41 with the 1922 publication of the classic that is her best-known work, The Velveteen Rabbit. She received the Newbery Honor for Winterbound.

== Early life and education ==
Margery Winifred Williams was born in London in 1881, the second daughter of a noted barrister and a renowned classical scholar, Robert Williams and Florence Williams née Harper. She and her sister were encouraged by her father, whom she remembered as a deeply loving and caring parent, to read and use their imaginations. Writing about her childhood many years later, she recalled how vividly her father described characters from various books and the infinite world of knowledge and adventure that lay on the printed page. She noted that the desire to read, which soon transformed into a need to write, was a legacy from her father that would be hers for a lifetime.

When Margery was seven years old, her father died suddenly, a life-changing event which, in one way or another, would affect all of her future creative activity. The undertone of sadness and the themes of death and loss that flow through her children's books have been criticised by some reviewers, but Williams always maintained that hearts acquire greater humanity through pain and adversity. She wrote that life is a process of constant change—there are departures for some and arrivals for others—and the process allows us to grow and persevere.

In 1890 Margery moved with her family to the United States. A year later they moved to a rural Pennsylvania farming community. Over the succeeding years, until 1898, Margery was a student at the Convent School in Sharon Hill, Pennsylvania.

Her ambition to make a living as an author propelled her in 1901, at the age of nineteen, to return to her birthplace and submit to a London publisher her first novel, The Late Returning, which was published in 1902 and aimed at an adult audience. It did not sell well and neither did her subsequent novels, The Price of Youth, and The Bar.

== Marriage, children and the influence of Walter de la Mare's writings ==
While visiting her publisher, Margery Williams met Francesco Bianco, an Italian living in London, who was employed as the manager of one of the book departments. They were married in 1904 and became the parents of a son, Cecco, and a daughter, Pamela. Pamela was a renowned child artist who had a showing in Turin at the age of eleven. Her fame brought the Bianco family to New York and (with the exception of Cecco) they lived in the Greenwich Village area until the end of their lives. Pamela illustrated some of her mother's books, including The Skin Horse and The Little Wooden Doll. When her children were young, Margery considered motherhood a full-time job, and her writing efforts were curtailed.

In 1907 the family left England, heading first to Paris, where Francesco was head of the rare books department at Brentano's. They later settled in Turin, Italy. In August 1914 Italy, along with the rest of Europe, was plunged into World War I and Francesco Bianco joined the Italian Army. While remaining home with the children, Margery Bianco gained hope and inspiration from the works of the poet she called her "spiritual mentor", Walter de la Mare, who she felt truly understood the mindset of children.

In 1914, Williams wrote a horror novel, The Thing in the Woods, about a werewolf in the Pennsylvania region. It was later republished in the US in a slightly revised version under the pseudonym Harper Williams. The Thing in the Woods was known to H. P. Lovecraft, and some commentators think it may have influenced his "The Dunwich Horror". He also wrote a poem entitled "On The Thing in the Woods by Harper Williams."

== Return to America and The Velveteen Rabbit ==
At the end of 1918 the Great War had ended, but postwar hunger and deprivation became a problem in Europe. In 1921, Bianco, along with her family, returned to the United States and settled in Greenwich Village. Inspired by the innocence and playful imagination of her children, as well as the inspiration she felt from the magic and mysticism contained in the works of Walter de la Mare, she decided to resume her writing, and gained almost immediate celebrity.

The Velveteen Rabbit or How Toys Become Real was Margery Williams Bianco's first American work, and it remains her most famous. It has remained a classic piece of literature through numerous adaptations in children's theatre as well as on radio, television and in the movies.

The author's trademark undercurrents of sentimentality and sadness persist in the tale of a small boy who finds a velveteen rabbit in his Christmas stocking. In the nursery the rabbit is looked down on by the fancier wind-up toys. He asks the skin horse, "What is Real?" The skin horse tells him, "When a child loves you for a long, long time, not just to play with, but REALLY loves you, then you become Real." The boy comes to adore the rabbit, and they are constant companions. This happy existence continues until the boy contracts scarlet fever. The rabbit stays with him, whispering to him of the games they will play again when he is better. As the boy gets better his family prepares to take him to the seaside. Although the rabbit looks forward to the seaside very much, the doctor insists he be thrown out and burned along with the other toys that may be infected. While the rabbit is waiting to be burned, he cries a real tear, from which a fairy emerges. The fairy tells the rabbit that he was real to the boy, because the boy loved him, but now she will make him truly real. Later, the boy sees a real rabbit in the garden. He thinks it looks like his old rabbit, but he does not know that it really is the velveteen rabbit he once loved.

== Successful author of children's books ==
Bianco wrote numerous other children's books, with her son becoming the namesake of one of them, 1925's Poor Cecco: The Wonderful Story of a Wonderful Wooden Dog Who Was the Jolliest Toy in the House Until He Went Out to Explore the World, about the interactions of children's toys with each other and with the human, animal, and toy members of the world beyond the toy cupboard. A return to more sober themes marks Bianco's other popular works, such as the same year's The Little Wooden Doll, illustrated by her daughter Pamela, in which the title character is badly mistreated by some children, but shown love and compassion by another child, which made her whole again.

Each year, for the remaining two decades of her life, Bianco produced numerous books and short stories. Most of them continued her preoccupation with toys coming to life and the ability of inanimate objects and animals to express human emotions and feelings. There was always melancholy, but in the end the reader emerged spiritually uplifted. 1926's The Apple Tree and The Adventures of Andy, 1927's The Skin Horse, also illustrated by Pamela, 1929's The Candlestick, 1930's Other People's Houses and 1931's The House that Grew Smaller are among some of her works from that period.

== Later years and death ==
In her final nine years, Bianco interspersed children's books with novels for young adults. These all featured young people who were in one way or another isolated or alienated from mainstream society and the joy, success, prosperity and social acceptance seemingly enjoyed by their peers. One of those books, Winterbound, about two girls, still in their teenage years, who are called upon to assume adult responsibilities in caring for their young siblings, when the parents have to go away suddenly, was a runner-up for the 1937 Newbery Medal showcasing excellence in youth literature. In 1971, upon the establishment of the Newbery Honor, the work was retroactively distinguished with that prestigious citation.

In 1939, as her native Britain entered World War II, Bianco began to include patriotic themes and references to European history in her works, such as 1941's Franzi and Gizi. Her final book, 1944's Forward Commandos!, was an inspirational story of wartime heroism, which included as one of its characters a black soldier. Acknowledging the contribution of African-Americans to the war effort was extremely rare in literary output of the time and that fact was noted in the book's reviews.

Margery Williams Bianco did not live to see World War II end. As Forward Commandos! went on sale, she became ill and, after three days in the hospital, died at the age of 63 on 4 September 1944 in New York City.

== Bibliography ==
=== Works ===
- 1902 The Late Returning
- 1904 The Price of Youth
- 1906 The Bar
- 1914 The Thing in the Woods (republished in 1924 as by Harper Williams)
- 1922 The Velveteen Rabbit
- 1925 Poor Cecco
- 1925 The Little Wooden Doll
- 1926 The Apple Tree
- 1927 The Skin Horse
- 1927 The Adventures of Andy
- 1929 All About Pets
- 1929 The Candlestick
- 1931 The House That Grew Smaller
- 1932 The Street of Little Shops
- 1933 The Hurdy-Gurdy Man
- 1934 The Good Friends
- 1934 More About Animals
- 1936 Green Grows the Garden
- 1936 Winterbound
- 1939 Other People's Houses
- 1941 Franzi and Gizi
- 1942 Bright Morning
- 1942 Penny and the White Horse
- 1944 Forward, Commandos!

=== Works translated ===
- 1927 The African Saga Translated from the French of Blaise Cendrars.
- 1928 Juniper Farm Translated from the French of René Bazin.
- 1929 Little Black Stories Translated from the French of Blaise Cendrars.
- 1935 Sidsel Longskirt and Solveig Suntrap with Dagny Mortensen. Translated from the Norwegian of Hans Aanrud.
- 1937 Rufus, the Fox Translated from the French of Samivel.
