= Prodigal Son (musician) =

Jamaican gospel singer

- Born: Calvin Curtis Whilby; June 2, 1976 (age 49)
- Origin: St. Catherine, Jamaica
- Genres: Reggae, Gospel, Dancehall
- Years active: 1998-current

Calvin Curtis Whilby (born 1976), better known as Prodigal Son, is a Jamaican gospel singer.

== Biography ==
Whilby was born in St. Catherine in 1976. He was raised by his grandmother. Following his grandmother’s death he moved to Kingston and settled in the Rema district where he was drawn into the gang violence in the area. He was invited to attend a church service and, inspired by the biblical parable, he became known as the Prodigal Son.

Son had no previous secular experience in music. He was introduced to famed producer Danny Brownie who soon became both mentor and friend. Brownie guided Son through his musical career and continues to be his ministry partner.

== Awards ==
Prodigal Son was the only gospel artist that appeared on the 2006 BMobile 'No Violence' school tour in Jamaica.

He has subsequently received several mainstream awards including: Jamaica Federation of Musicians, best new gospel artiste for 2001, the Xnews award, artist of the year 2001, Jamaica Federation of Musicians best male gospel vocalist 2002 and Irie FM's Gospel Artiste of the year ('06), other accolades include the Marlin Awards for Outstanding Reggae Recording of the year and Outstanding DJ Vocal Performance of the year for the year 2003, Marlin award for Best Dancehall Recording for 2004, U. S. Urban Gospel Award, best Producer 2005, Urban Gospel Award best Caribbean Artiste, Canadian Maja Award album of the year 2006. he has achieved and maintains numerous number-one spots on charts like UK's United by 1, Love 101 FM Jamaica, Flow FM Canada, Mystic 98, Fort Lauderdale, Florida and UK's Soulcare.

He was interviewed and featured on the US network CBS on the 700 club programme 'Turning Point' where he shared his life changing testimony.

His debut album, Radikal Prodigal, produced by Danny Brownie featured crossover hits I Wish, Woe, and Radikal Style, all three songs were the first dancehall gospel songs to be played on mainstream radio in Jamaica. His second album Still Standing, which was self-produced, was voted best gospel album of 2005 by Love 101 and track #10, Journey voted song of the year, a second song Track # 5 Still Standing is nominated by the International Reggae & World Music Award as best gospel song.

== Discography ==
- Radikal Prodigal (Main Street Music, 2001)
- Still Standing (Radikal Yawd)
- Half Way There (Radikal Yawd Music, 2010)
- 76 99 (Radikal Yawd Music/VPAL, 2012)
- The Prodigal Son (Main Street Music)
