= Prodigal Daughter =

Prodigal Daughter or The Prodigal Daughter may refer to:

== Art ==
- The Prodigal Daughter (painting), a 1903 oil painting by John Collier

== Film and television ==
- "Prodigal Daughter" (Star Trek: Deep Space Nine), an episode of the TV series
- "Prodigal Daughter", the premiere episode of TV series A Place to Call Home (season 1)
- "Prodigal Daughter", an episode of Easy (TV series)
- "Prodigal Daughter", an episode of Tadhana Philippine TV series
- Prodigal Daughters, a lost 1923 American silent drama film

== Literature ==
- The Prodigal Daughter, a 1982 novel by Jeffrey Archer
- The Prodigal Daughter, a novel by Prue Leith
- The Prodigal Daughter: A Biography of Sherwood Bonner, a 1981 book by Hubert Horton McAlexander
- The Prodigal Daughter: Reclaiming an Unfinished Childhood, a 2008 memoir by Margaret Gibson

== Music ==
- "Prodigal Daughter", a song by Jonatha Brooke on the 2007 album Careful What You Wish For
- "Prodigal Daughter (Cotton Eyed Joe)", a song by Michelle Shocked on the 1992 album Arkansas Traveler
- "Prodigal Daughter", a song by Larry Stewart on the 1999 album Learning to Breathe
- "Prodigal Daughter", a song by Eddi Reader on the 2001 album Simple Soul
- "Prodigal Daughter", a song by Lights on the 2022 album Pep

== Theatre ==
- Prodigal Daughter, a play by J. E. Franklin, 1975
- The Prodigal Daughter, a play by Augustus Harris and Henry Pettitt, 1892

== See also ==
- The Prodigal Son (disambiguation)
- The Prodigal Woman (disambiguation)
