= Diego Duarte (art collector) =

Diego Duarte or Jacob Duarte (1612–1691) was a 17th-century Portuguese jeweler, banker, composer, organist and art collector living in Antwerp, who owned paintings by Jan Vermeer, Raphael and others.

Duarte was born in Antwerp, the son of Gaspar Duarte I, a Christian diamond and art dealer of Jewish descent in Antwerp, whose circle of friends included Constantijn Huygens. Gaspar was the son of Diego Duarte I, and was born in 1584 in Antwerp. He later became the consul of Portugal in Antwerp. In 1635, Diego was appointed "jeweller in ordinary" by Charles I of England, but he returned to Antwerp in 1642. He received a part of the art collection of his father on his death in 1653, and continued collecting throughout his life. Part of his collection was sold in Amsterdam in 1682. Diego had a long correspondence and friendship with Constantijn Huygens Jr. The house of the Duarte family in Antwerp was called the Antwerp Parnassus, a meeting place for intellectuals to enjoy art and music. William III of England repeatedly stayed at the house between 1674 and 1678. Diego's brother Gaspar Duarte II was an art collector as well, and his sister Leonora was a composer. After the childless death of Diego Duarte in 1691, no Duartes remained in Antwerp.

Some 200 paintings of Diego's collection were inherited by his nephew Manuel Levy Duarte. Most were sold between 1693 and 1696.

== Collection ==
This incomplete list is based on the inventory of 1682, and uses the attributions given therein for what they're worth.

- Jacob Adriaensz Backer, Last Judgment
- Jacopo Bassano, 1 piece
- Theodoor Boeyermans, 7 pieces
- Paris Bordone, 1 piece
- Paul Bril, a Pan and 2 other pieces
- Adriaen Brouwer, 3 pieces
- Jan Brueghel the Elder, 14 pieces
- Pieter Bruegel the Elder, a version of The Peasant Wedding, a Peasant Dance, and a Flight To Egypt
- Caravaggio, 1 piece
- Michiel Coxie, a Maria
- Jan Davidsz. de Heem, 3 pieces
- Gerrit Dou, 2 pieces
- Adam Elsheimer, 3 pieces
- Jan Fyt, 3 pieces
- Giorgione, 3 pieces
- Hans Holbein the Younger, 1 piece
- Jan Mabuse, Portrait of a Praying Man and a portrait of King Henry VIII and his sisters as children
- Quentin Matsys, 4 pieces
- Antonis Mor, Self Portrait as the Apostle Paul and five other paintings
- Palma Vecchio, 2 pieces
- Parmigianino, 4 pieces
- Jan Porcellis or Julius Porcellis, 3 pieces
- Raphael: Holy Family with Anne (this was judged to be the most valuable painting in the 1682 inventory of Duarte's collection), Sacrifice of Elijah and Vision of Ezekiel
- Guido Reni, 1 piece
- Jusepe de Ribera, 1 piece
- Hans Rottenhammer, 4 pieces: one in collaboration with Paul Brill, two with Jan Brueghel the Elder
- Peter Paul Rubens, Opportunity (an important but lost work, known from a few copies), The Prodigal Son (now at the Royal Museum of Fine Arts, Antwerp), 4 other pieces, and two oil sketches
- Rubens and Jan Brueghel the Elder, Battle of the Amazons, now in Sanssouci
- Rubens and Frans Snyders, Silenus
- Rubens and Jan Boeckhorst, 2 paintings
- Andrea del Sarto, Anna selbdritt, two other paintings, and two sketches
- David Teniers the Younger, Peasant Kermis
- Tintoretto, 2 pieces
- Titian, a Mary Magdalen and four other works
- Jan van Dalen, 2 pieces showing a male and female pilgrim
- Anthony van Dyck, twelve paintings
- Jan van Eyck, a King of the Moors
- Lucas van Leyden, a Maria
- Frans van Mieris the Elder, The Serenade and 1 other piece
- Cornelius van Poelenburgh, 4 pieces
- Hendrik van Steenwijk II and other members of his family, 3 pieces
- Nicolaes van Verendael, 3 pieces
- Jan Vermeer, Lady Standing at a Virginal or Lady Seated at a Virginal (the other was owned at the same time by Jacob Dissius)
- Wouwerman (unsure which of the three brothers), 8 pieces
