= The Return of the Prodigal Son (Rembrandt) =

1868 painting by Rembrandt

- Artist: Rembrandt
- Year: 1661–1669
- Medium: Oil on canvas
- Dimensions: 262 cm × 205 cm (103 in × 81 in)
- Location: Hermitage Museum, Saint Petersburg

The Return of the Prodigal Son (Dutch: De terugkeer van de verloren zoon) is an oil painting by Rembrandt, part of the collection of the Hermitage Museum in St. Petersburg. It is among the Dutch master's final works, likely completed within two years of his death in 1669. Depicting the moment of the prodigal son's return to his father in the Biblical parable, it is a renowned work described by art historian Kenneth Clark as "a picture which those who have seen the original in St. Petersburg may be forgiven for claiming as the greatest picture ever painted".

In the painting, the son has returned home in a wretched state from travels in which he has wasted his inheritance and fallen into poverty and despair. He kneels before his father in repentance, wishing for forgiveness and the position of a servant in his father's household, having realized that even his father's servants had a better station in life than he. His father receives him with a tender gesture and welcomes him as his own son. His hands seem to suggest mothering and fathering at once; the left appears larger and more masculine, set on the son's shoulder, while the right is softer and more receptive in gesture. Standing at the right is the prodigal son's older brother, who crosses his hands in judgment; in the parable he objects to the father's compassion for the sinful son:

But he answered his father, "Listen! For all these years I have been working like a slave for you, and I have never disobeyed your command, yet you have never given me even a young goat so that I might celebrate with my friends. But when this son of yours came back, who has devoured your assets with prostitutes, you killed the fatted calf for him!"
—Luke 15:29–30, NRSV

The father explains, "But it was appropriate to celebrate and be glad, for this, your brother, was dead, and is alive again. He was lost, and is found" (Luke 15:32).

Rembrandt was moved by the parable, and he made a variety of drawings, etchings, and paintings on the theme that spanned decades, beginning with a 1636 etching (see Gallery). The Return of the Prodigal Son includes figures not directly related to the parable but seen in some of these earlier works; their identities have been debated. The woman at top left, barely visible, is likely the mother, while the seated man, whose dress implies wealth, may be an advisor to the estate or a tax collector.

== Reception ==
The Return of the Prodigal Son demonstrates the mastery of the late Rembrandt. His evocation of spirituality and the parable's message of forgiveness has been considered the height of his art. Rembrandt scholar Rosenberg (et al.) calls the painting "monumental", writing that Rembrandt:

interprets the Christian idea of mercy with extraordinary solemnity, as though this were his spiritual testament to the world. [The painting] goes beyond the work of all other Baroque artists in the evocation of religious mood and human sympathy. The aged artist's power of realism is not diminished, but increased by psychological insight and spiritual awareness ... The observer is roused to a feeling of some extraordinary event ... The whole represents a symbol of homecoming, of the darkness of human existence illuminated by tenderness, of weary and sinful mankind taking refuge in the shelter of God's mercy.

Art historian H. W. Janson writes that Prodigal Son "may be [Rembrandt's] most moving painting. It is also his quietest—a moment stretching into eternity. So pervasive is the mood of tender silence that the viewer feels a kinship with this group. That bond is perhaps stronger and more intimate in this picture than in any earlier work of art."

Dutch priest Henri Nouwen (1932–1996) was so taken by the painting that he eventually wrote a book, The Return of the Prodigal Son: A Story of Homecoming (1992), using the parable and Rembrandt's painting as frameworks. He begins by describing his visit to the State Hermitage Museum in 1986, where he was able to contemplate the painting alone for hours. Considering the role of the father and sons in the parable in relation to Rembrandt's biography, he wrote:

Rembrandt is as much the elder son of the parable as he is the younger. When, during the last years of his life, he painted both sons in Return of the Prodigal Son, he had lived a life in which neither the lostness of the younger son nor the lostness of the elder son was alien to him. Both needed healing and forgiveness. Both needed to come home. Both needed the embrace of a forgiving father. But from the story itself, as well as from Rembrandt's painting, it is clear that the hardest conversion to go through is the conversion of the one who stayed home.

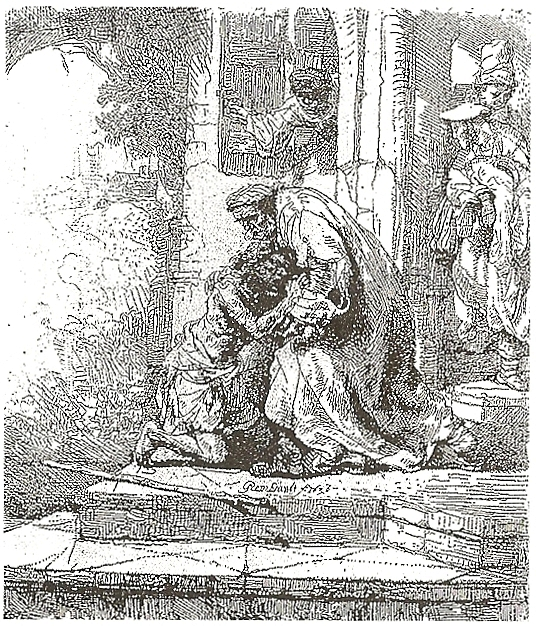
Rembrandt's 1636 etching on the subject, influenced by a woodcut by Martin van Heemskerck

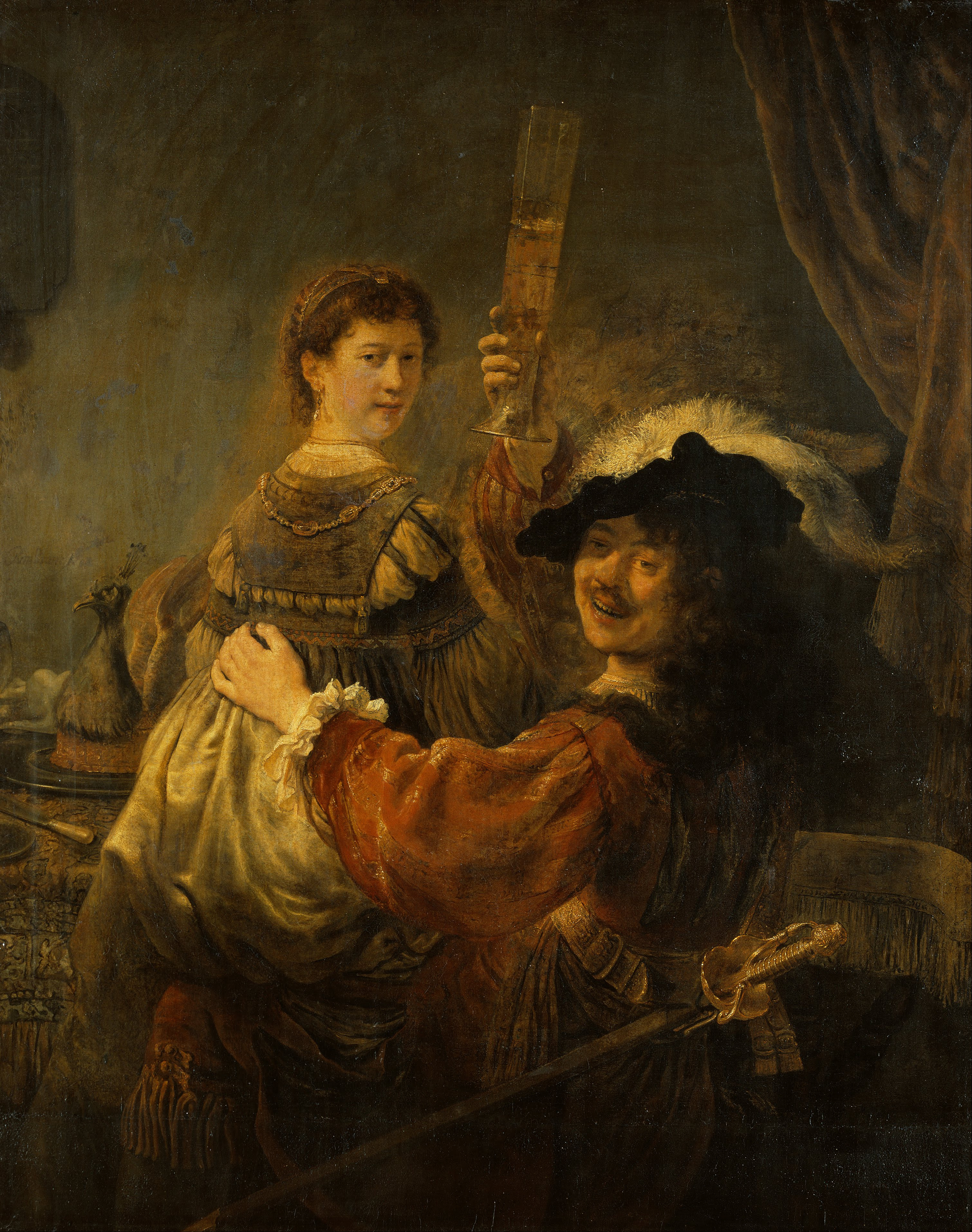
The Prodigal Son in the Brothel (c. 1637)

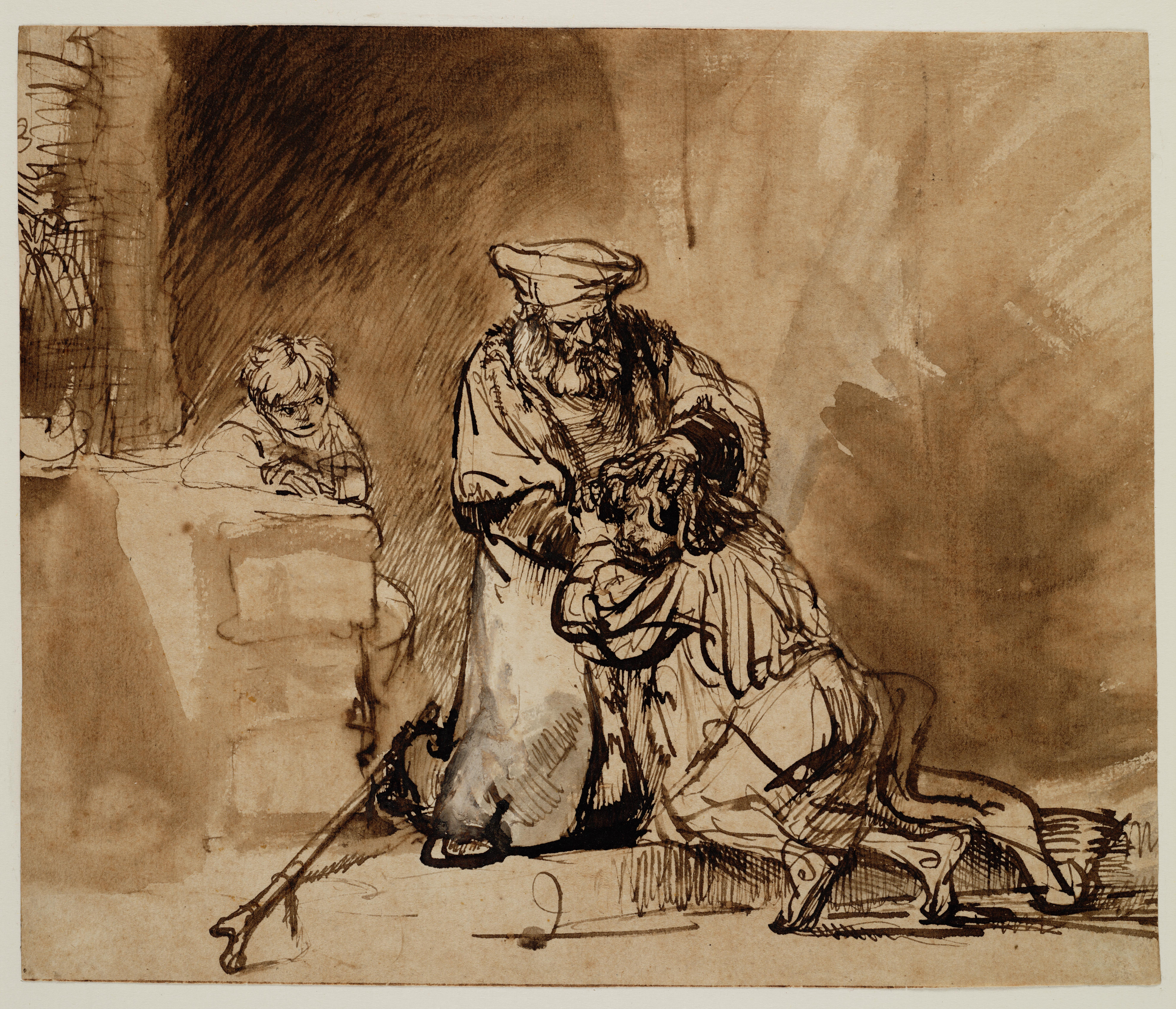
1642 drawing

== See also ==
- List of paintings by Rembrandt
