= The Prodigal Woman (1984 film) =

- Directed by: Mario Soffici; Leo Fleider; Ralph Pappier
- Screenplay by: Alejandro Casona
- Based on: La pródiga by Pedro Antonio de Alarcón
- Starring: Eva Duarte
- Cinematography: Francis Boeniger
- Edited by: Oscar Carchano
- Music by: Alejandro Gutiérrez del Barrio
- Release date: 16 August 1984
- Running time: 67 minutes
- Country: Argentina
- Language: Spanish

The Prodigal Woman (Spanish: La pródiga) is an Argentine drama film directed by Mario Soffici and co-directed by Leo Fleider and Ralph Pappier. It stars Eva Duarte as a wasteful rich woman who has a social awakening. The film is based on a novel by Pedro Antonio de Alarcón.

The film was shot in 1945, in Córdoba and the San Miguel studios in Buenos Aires. It was Duarte's first leading role in a film and also her last film. It was to be released toward the end of 1945, but in the meantime Duarte married the presidential candidate Juan Perón. Her new position in Argentina's political life, and her considerable influence on her husband, made the film inappropriate for release, and it was postponed indefinitely. It was eventually released in Argentina on 16 August 1984.

== Summary ==
Julia is the owner of a grand mansion situated in the midst of a valley. After living a licentious life, she makes a decision to redirect her fortune towards others, earning her the nickname "the prodigal." However, everything changes when an engineer arrives with different plans for the land, altering the fate of both Julia and the valley.

== Cast ==
- Eva Duarte
- Juan José Míguez
- Angelina Pagano
- Ernesto Raquén
- Ricardo Galache
- Francisco López Silva
- Enrique San Miguel
- Malisa Zini
- Alberto Closas
- Lidia Denis
- Pura Díaz
- Arsenio Perdiguero
- Mercedes Díaz
- Manuel Alcón
- Ricardo Talesnik
- Alfredo Almanza
