= Remojadas =

Culture, archaeological site and artistic style in first-millennium Veracruz, Mexico

Coordinates: 18°59′N 96°19′W

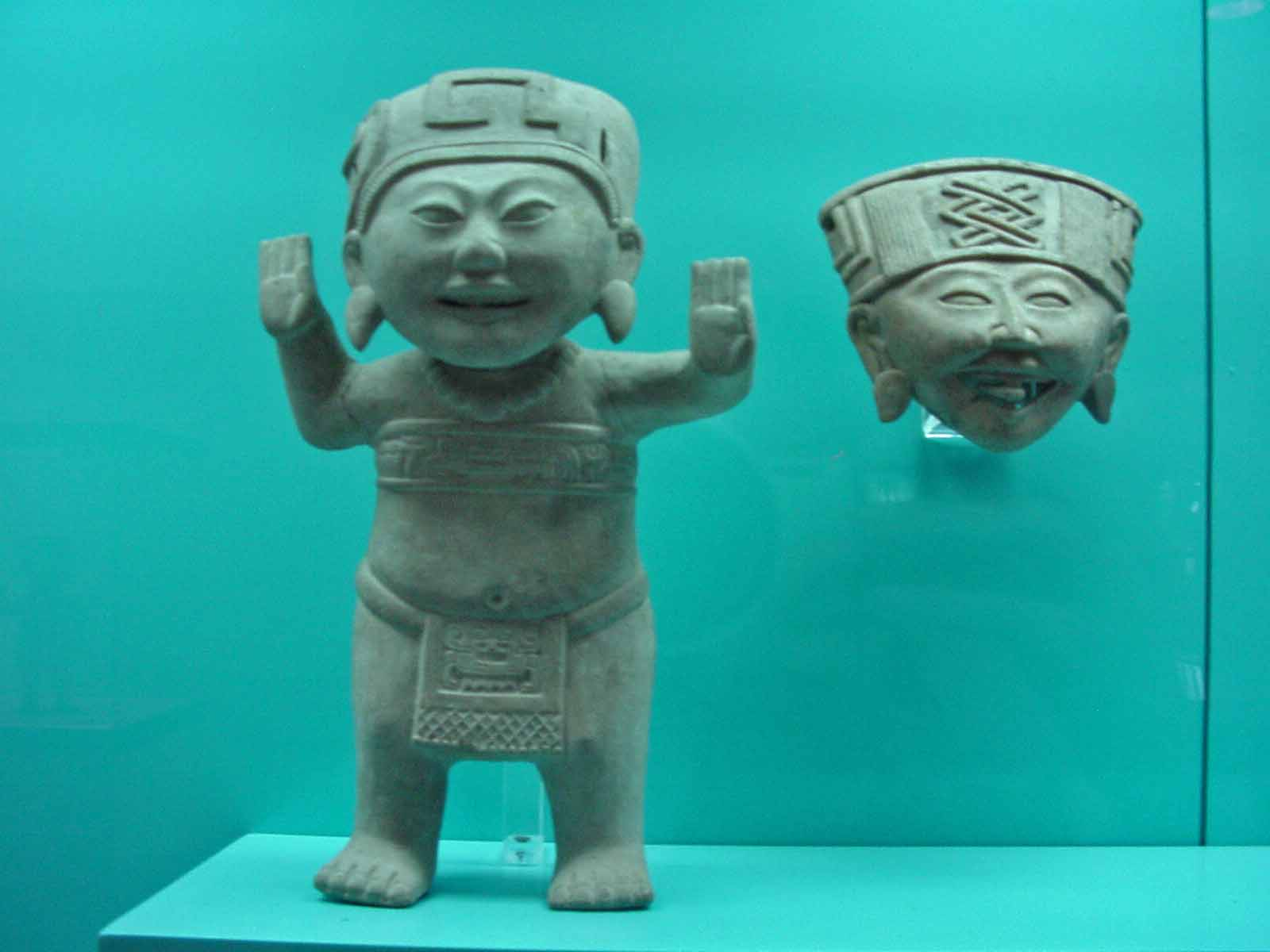
A Sonrientes figurine (curiously, with two right hands), and a head in the Remojadas style, 300 CE to 900 CE.

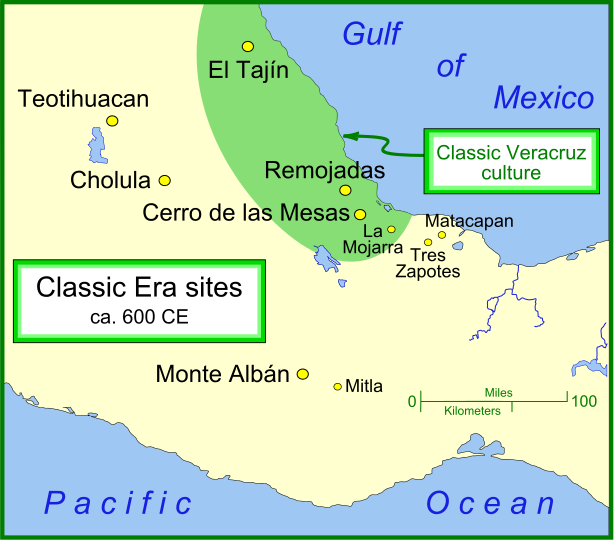
Remojadas and other important Classic Era settlements

Remojadas (Spanish pronunciation: [remoˈxaðas]) is a name applied to a culture, an archaeological site, as well as an artistic style that flourished on Mexico's Veracruz Gulf Coast from perhaps 100 BCE to 800 CE. The Remojadas culture is considered part of the larger Classic Veracruz culture. Further research into the Remojadas culture is "much needed". The archaeological site has remained largely unexplored since the initial investigations by Alfonso Medellin Zenil in 1949 and 1950.

== Figurines ==
Remojadas is particularly known for its pottery and its hollow ceramic figurines. Thousands of these expressive and diverse figurines have been unearthed, found across a wide variety of settings, including burials and middens.

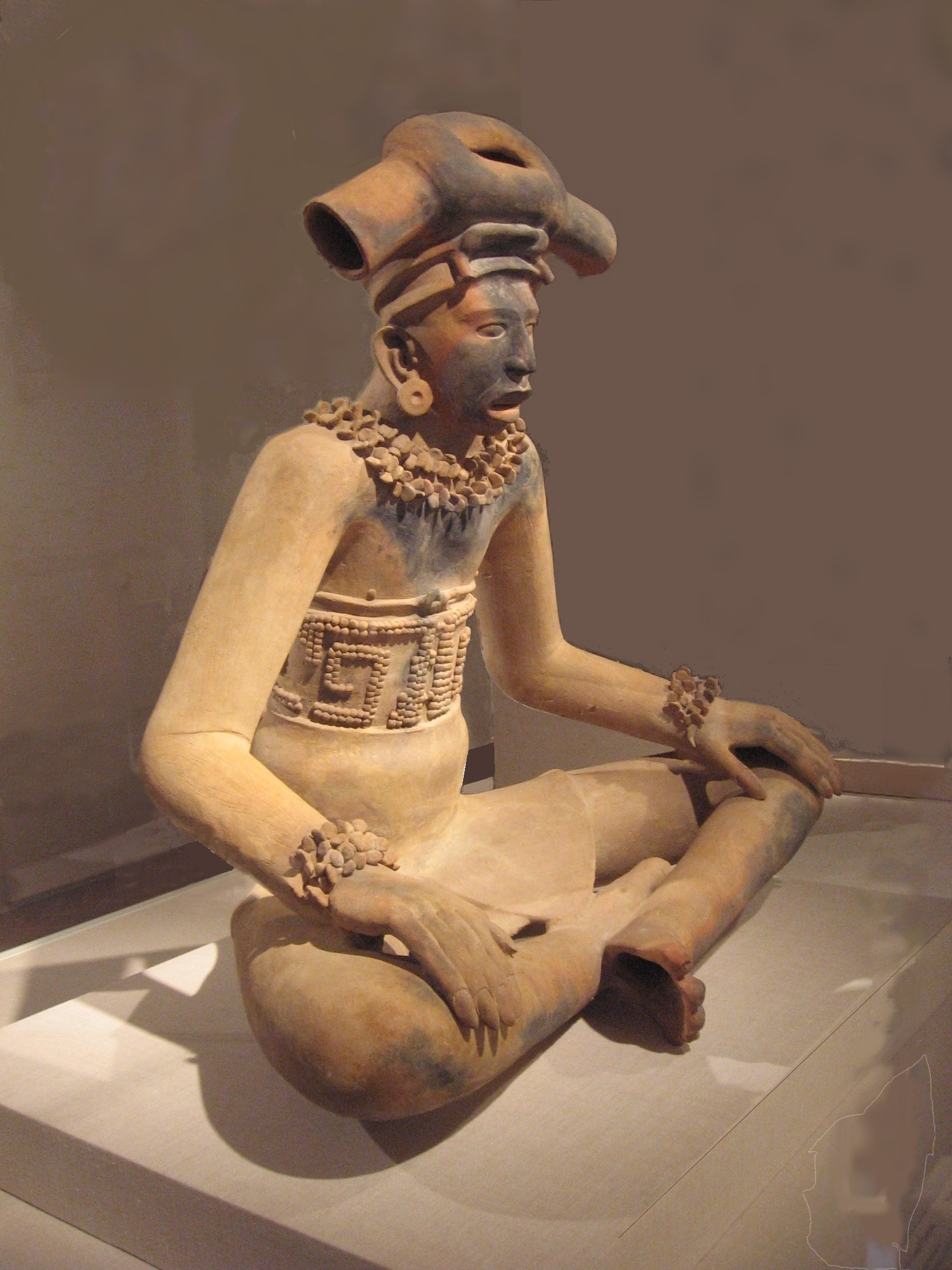
A large terracotta figurine of a young chieftain in the Remojadas style. In his 1957 book on Mesoamerican art, Miguel Covarrubias speaks of Remojadas' "magnificent hollow figures with expressive faces, in majestic postures and wearing elaborate paraphernalia indicated by added clay elements." 300 - 600 CE; Height: 31 in (79 cm).

Figurines portray deities, rulers, and commoners, as well as many types of animals including dogs and deer. Of particular note are the curious childlike Sonrientes (smiling face) figurines and faces. Many of the figurines of this period function as flutes, whistles, and ocarinas. Some animal figurines, interpreted as toys or more likely ritual items, are equipped with wheels, one of the few recorded instances of the application of wheel technology in the pre-Columbian Americas.

Many figurines have filed teeth, representing a common practice in the Remojadas culture. The earliest figurines were handmade while the later ones were created using molds. In style and in other ways, the figurines have a close kinship with Maya figurines.

=== Sonrientes ===
The Sonrientes (smiling faces) are the most well-known of Remojadas figurines, featuring wide smiles on curiously shaped—almost triangular—faces. Often the heads are disembodied. Other times they are attached to childlike bodies with outstretched arms and displayed palms. The smile is rather formalised, usually showing teeth and, on occasion, a tongue sticking out between the teeth.

Male sonrientes are nude or wear loinclothes. Females wear skirts. Both are usually adorned with pectoral bands and/or necklaces, as well as some type of headdress. The headdress, and often the skirts, display a glyph-like emblem or a stylized animal.

Smiling figurines are rare in Mesoamerican art, and the sheer number of Sonrientes figurines likely attests to their special role in the Remojadas society, although what that role might be has produced much speculation. Some researchers see the characteristic smile as being hallucinogenically produced or perhaps the result of consumption of the alcoholic pulque. One researcher boldly states that they are "undoubtedly related to the cult of the dead". However, Mary Ellen Miller and Karl Taube find that "it is more likely that many of the smiling figures represent performers".

== Notes ==
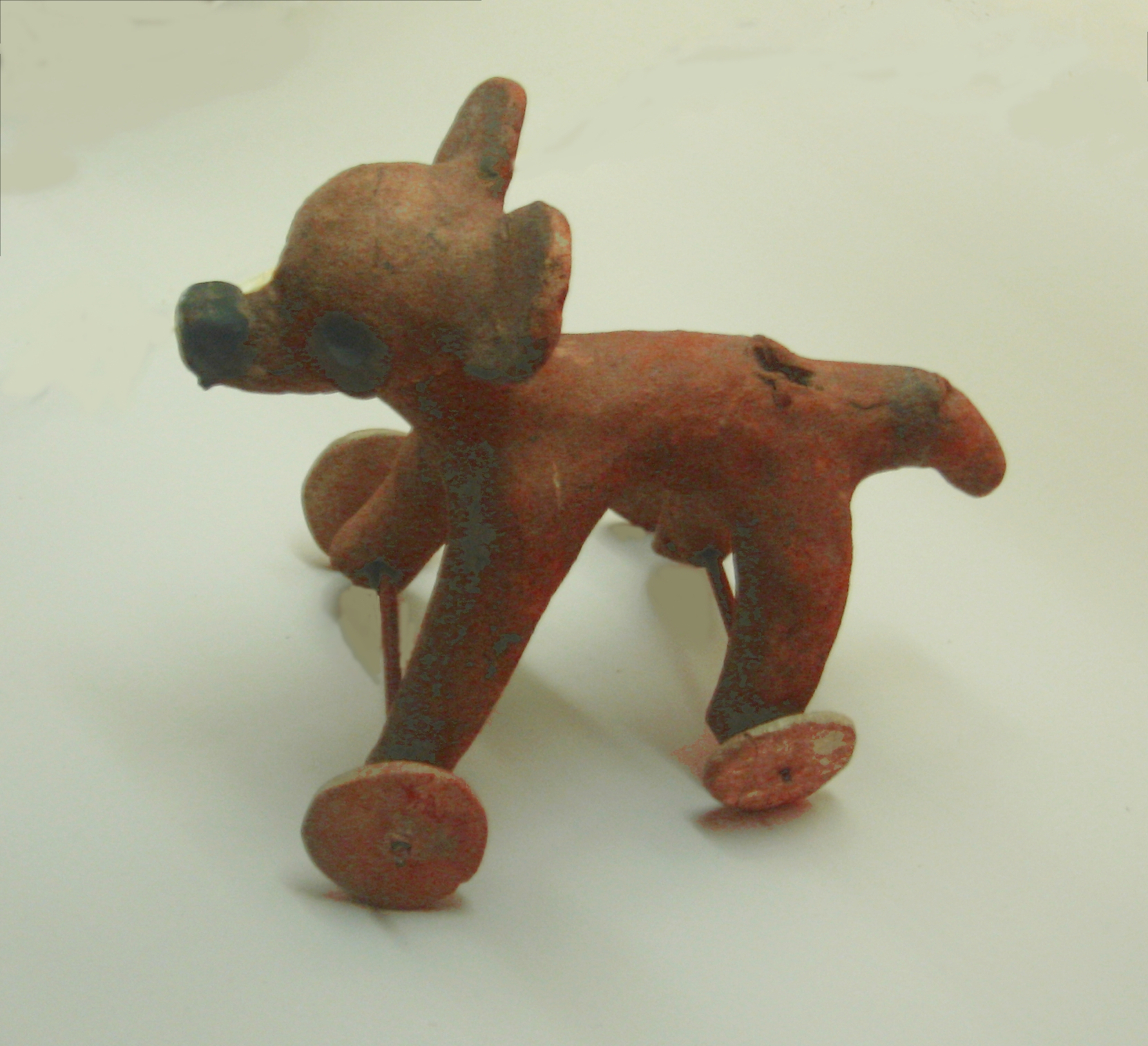
A wheeled deer (or perhaps dog), in the Remojadas style. This ceramic figurine also functions as a whistle. Its nose is painted with bitumen, a type of crude petroleum. Height: 7 in. (18 cm); length: 8 in (21 cm).
