= Classic Veracruz culture =

Cultural area in present-day Mexican state of Veracruz

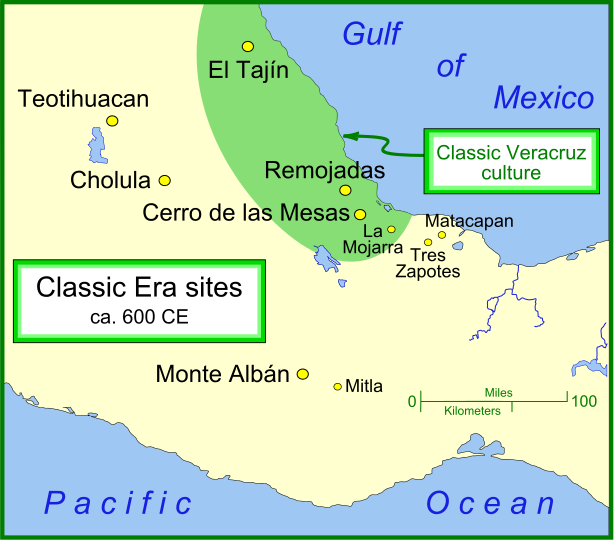
The Classic Veracruz culture and other important Classic Era settlements

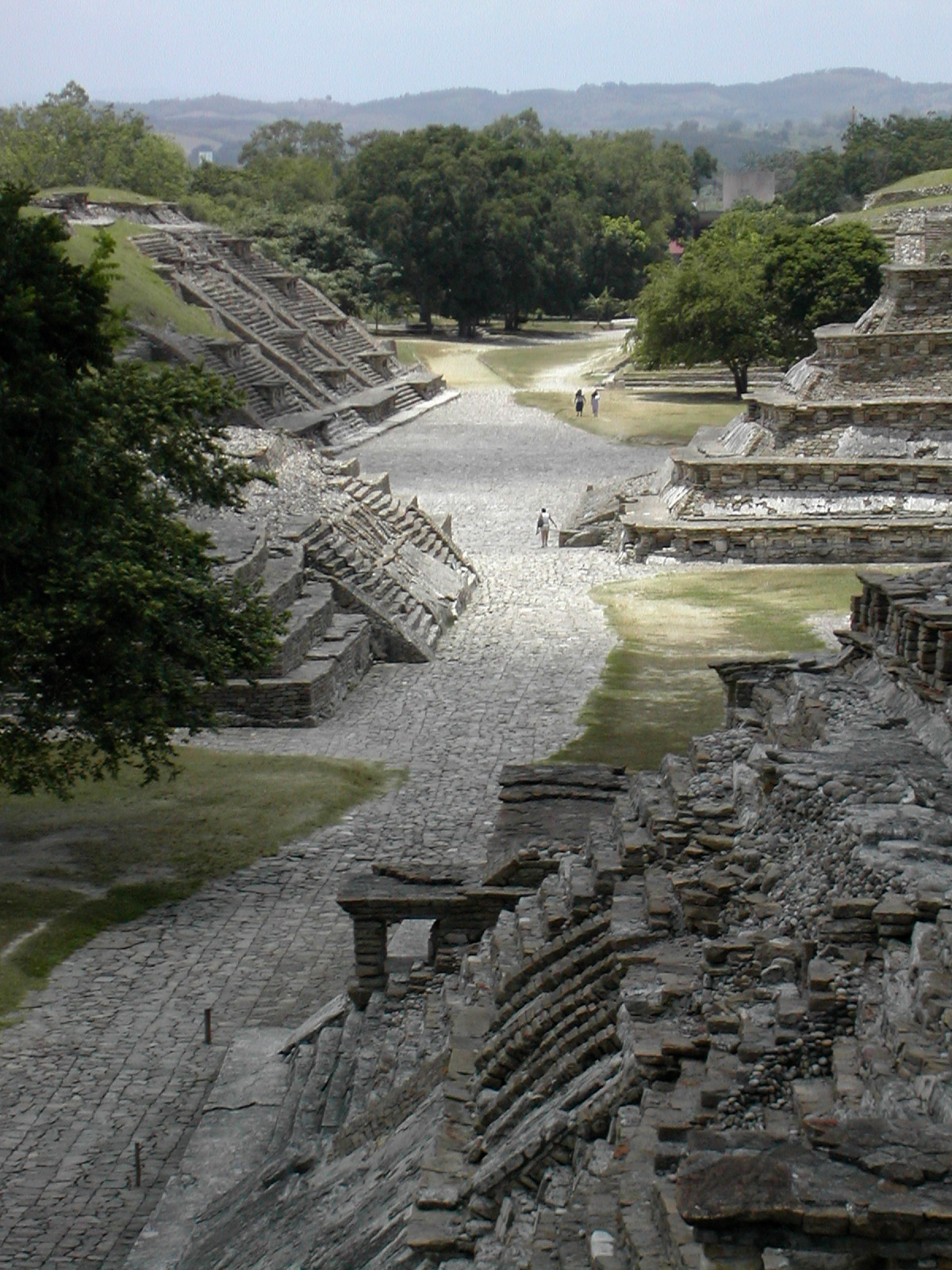
View of the ceremonial centre of El Tajín in Veracruz, Mexico

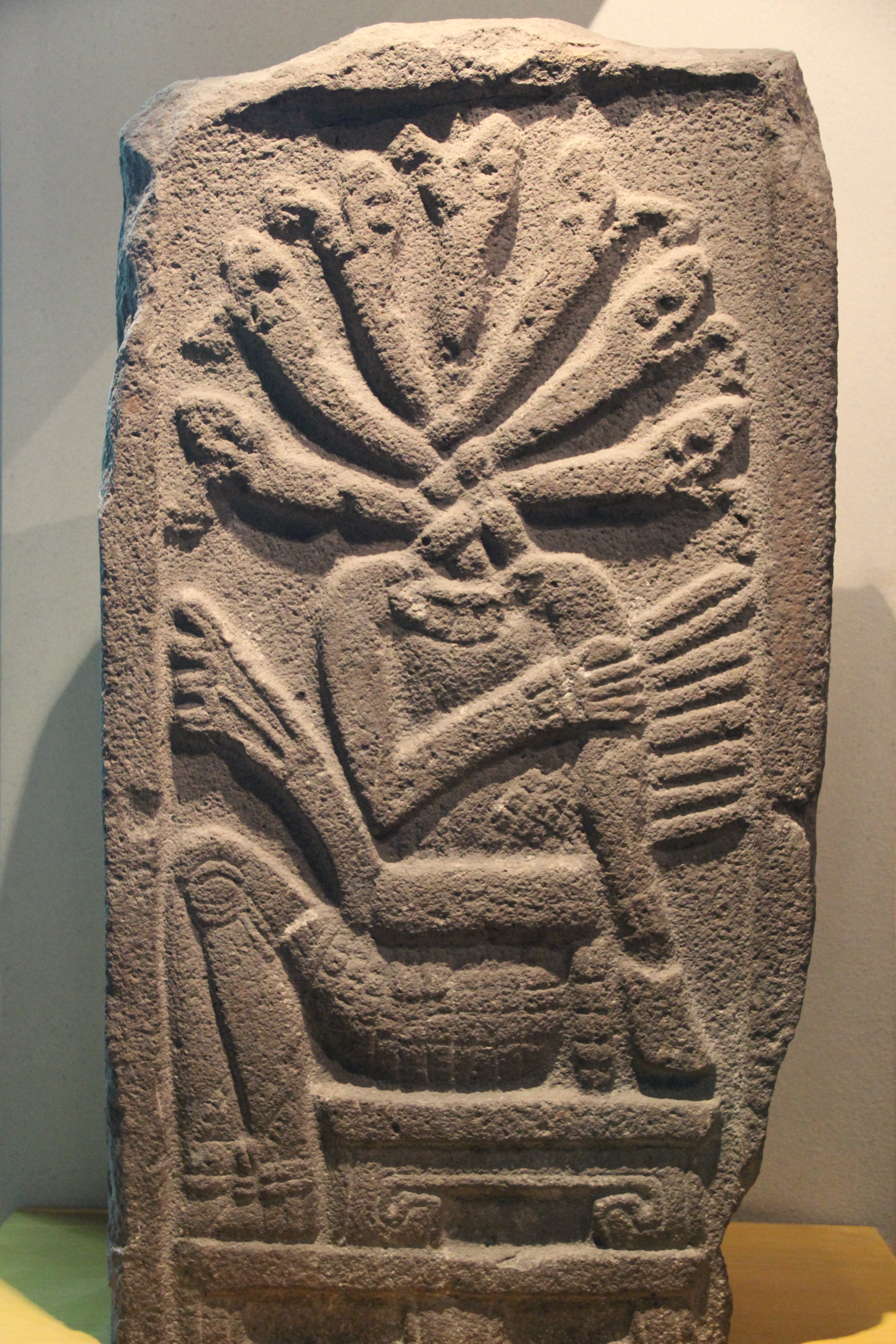
A stela from the Classic Veracruz site of Aparicio, showing a sacrificed ballplayer, 400–700 CE. Height: 125 cm (4 ft).

Classic Veracruz culture (or Gulf Coast Classic culture) refers to a cultural area in the north and central areas of the present-day Mexican state of Veracruz, a culture that existed from roughly 100 to 1000 CE, or during the Classic era.

El Tajin was the major center of Classic Veracruz culture; other notable settlements include Higueras, Zapotal, Cerro de las Mesas, Nopiloa, and Remojadas, the latter two important ceramics centers. The culture spanned the Gulf Coast between the Pánuco River on the north and the Papaloapan River on the south.

The Classic Veracruz culture is sometimes associated with the Totonacs, who were occupying this territory at the time of the Spanish Conquest of the Aztec Empire. However, there is little or no evidence that the Totonacs were the originators of the Classic era culture. Another candidate for the ethnolinguistic identity is the Huastecs.

== Social structure ==
Burials, monumental sculpture, relief carvings, and the distribution of architecture within the regional centers all point to a stratification of Classic Veracruz society, including the presence of an elite rank as well as craft specialization. Elite hereditary rulers held sway over these small- to medium-sized regional centers, none over 2,000 km^{2} (770 sq mi), maintaining their rule through political and religious control of far-flung trade networks and legitimizing it through typical Mesoamerican rites such as bloodletting, human sacrifice, warfare, and use of exotic goods. Much or most of the population, however, lived in isolated homesteads, hamlets, or villages.

Like the Epi-Olmec and Olmec cultures before it, Classic Veracruz culture was based on swidden, or slash-and-burn, agriculture, with maize an important component of the diet, supplemented with domestic dog, wild deer and other mammals, and fish and shellfish. Cotton was also an important crop.

== Religion ==
Little is known concerning Classic Veracruz religion and inferences have to be made from better-known Mesoamerican religions such as those of the Aztec, Mixtec, and Maya. Only some of the many deity figures known from these religions have been recognized with any certainty. Large ceramic figures show a stooped, very old man representing the Mesoamerican fire god. Equally large ceramic statues show female earth goddesses with snake girdles connected to the site of El Zapotal. Based on their closed eyes and wide open mouths, and also on the nearby shrine of a death god and on the surrounding burials, the latter have been identified as deified women who died in child birth, more or less corresponding to the much later Aztec cihuateteo ('female gods') also known from the Codex Borgia. Otherwise similar ceramic statues of earth goddesses, however, standing or seated, do not have dead faces and should therefore not be compared to the Aztec cihuateteo. The ball court reliefs of El Tajin prominently depict a death god, a rain god and what may be a sun god and are important for their narrative quality perhaps related to the origin of pulque. Hachas commonly show the head of an aged god probably connected to earth and water. An earth monster was likely inherited from the Olmecs. Many ceremonially clad ceramic figurines have been found that testify to the importance of public ritual, while the ceramic figurines of persons with smiling and laughing faces (the so-called sonrientes) seem to represent ritual performers; they may point to a cult similar to that of the much later Aztec deity Xochipilli. However, hardly anything is known about the interrelations of the deities mentioned above, their role in the religious feasts, and the possible connection of these feasts to the calendar (like the monthly feasts of the Aztec and Maya).

== Mesoamerican ballgame ==
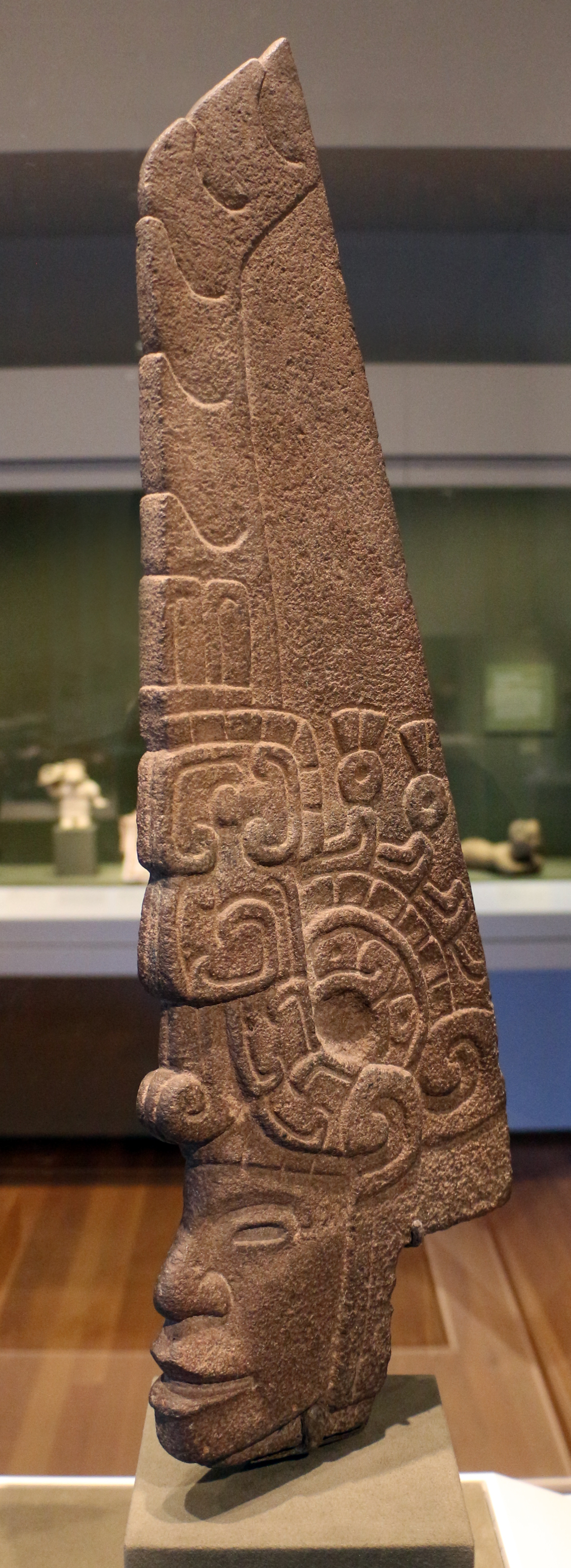
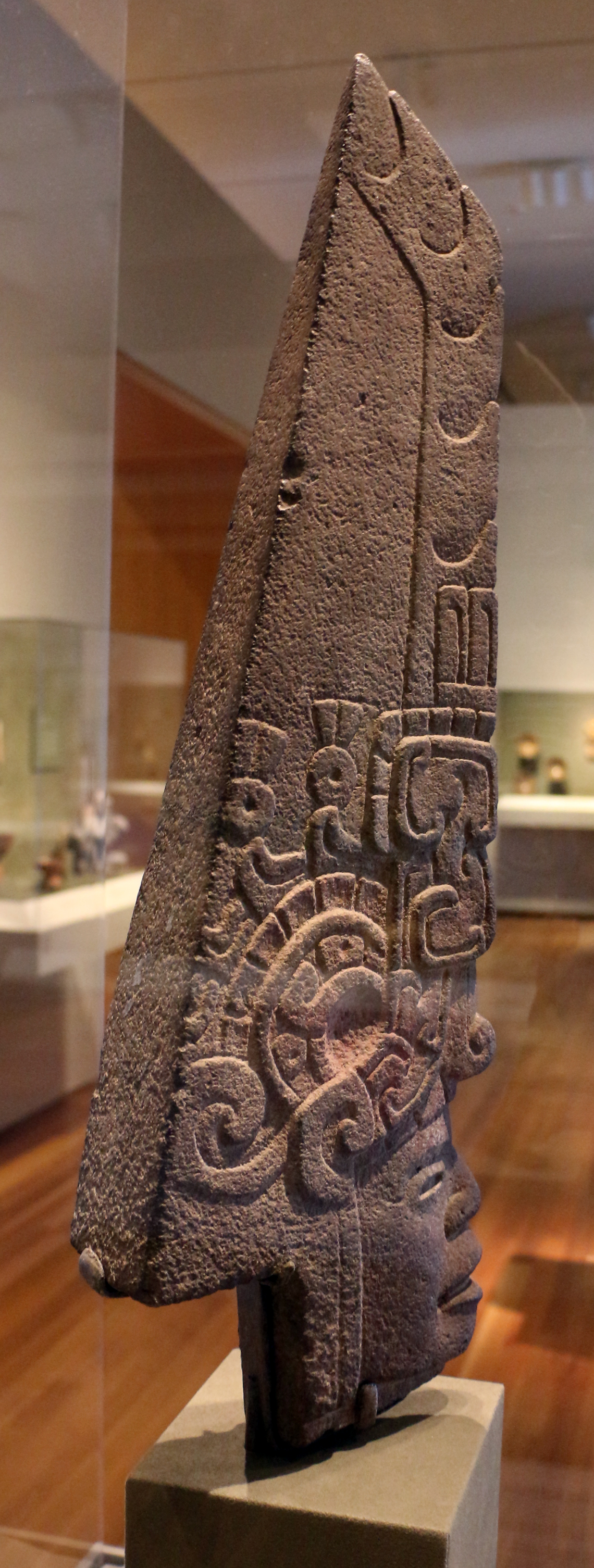
A stone hacha (axe) depicting a ball player's head

The Classic Veracruz culture was seemingly obsessed with the ballgame. Every cultural center had at least one ballcourt, while up to 18 ballcourts have been found at El Tajin. It was during Late Classic here in north-central Veracruz that the ballgame reached its height.

The ballgame rituals appear throughout Classic Veracruz monumental art. The walls of largest ballcourt, the East Ballcourt at El Tajin are lined with carved murals showing human sacrifice in the context of the ballgame (see photo above). The culmination of these murals is a tableau showing the rain god, who pierces his penis (an act of bloodletting) to replenish a vat of the alcoholic, ritual drink pulque, the apparent desired result of the ballgame ritual sacrifice.

A defining characteristic of the Classic Veracruz culture is the presence of stone ballgame gear: yokes, hachas, and palmas. Yokes are U-shaped stones worn about the waist of a ballplayer, while the hachas and palmas sit upon the yoke. Palmas were fitted to the front of a yoke and were elongated sculptures often of effigies of birds—like turkeys—or realistic scenes. Hachas were thin stone heads that were markers that were typically placed in the court to score the game, but could be worn on the yoke. Archaeologists generally suppose that the stone yokes are ritual versions of leather, cotton, and/or wood yokes, although no such perishable artifacts have yet been unearthed. While the yokes and hachas have been found from Teotihuacan to Guatemala, the palmas seem peculiar to what is today northern Veracruz.

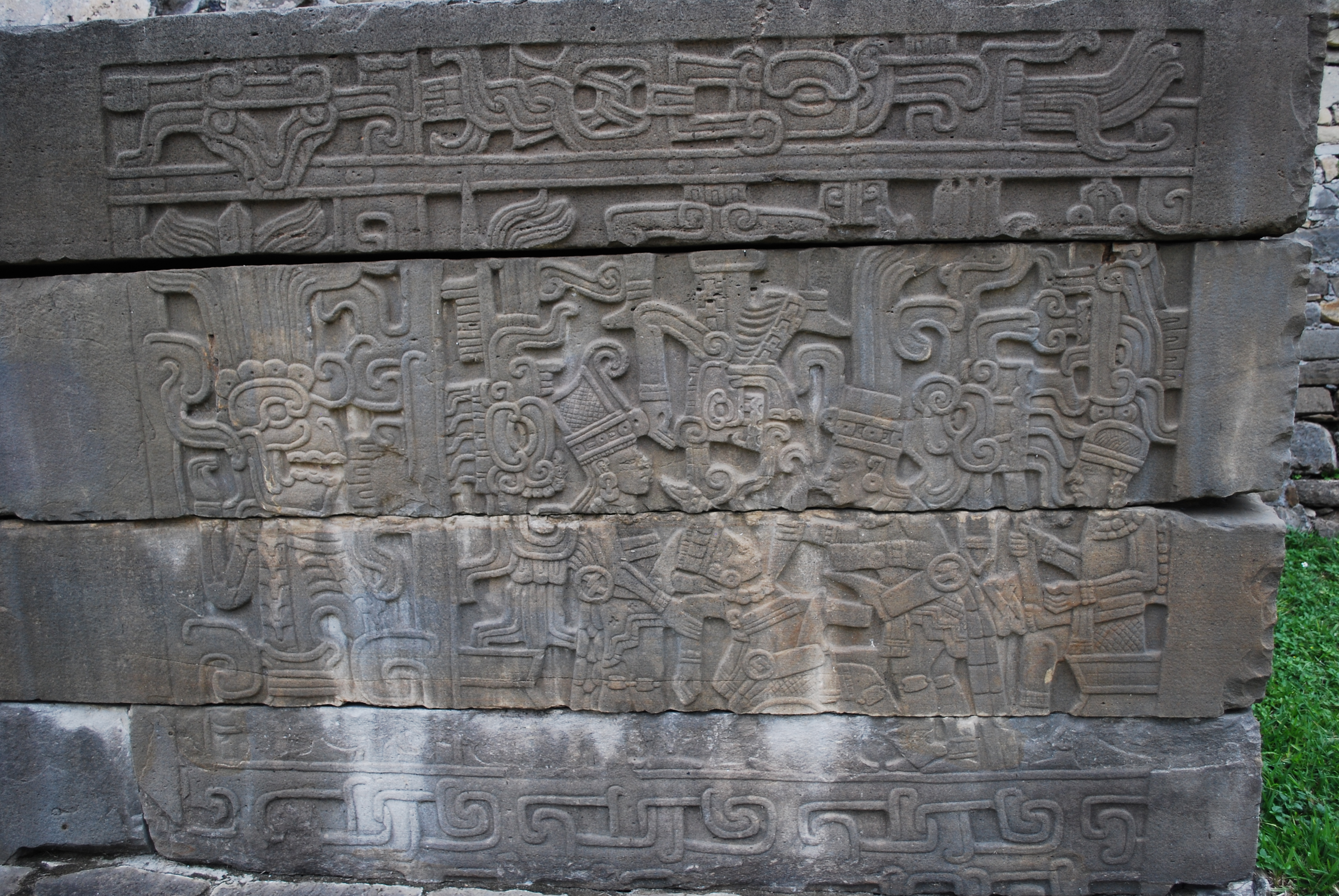
One of a series of murals from the South Ballcourt at El Tajin, showing the sacrifice of a ballplayer

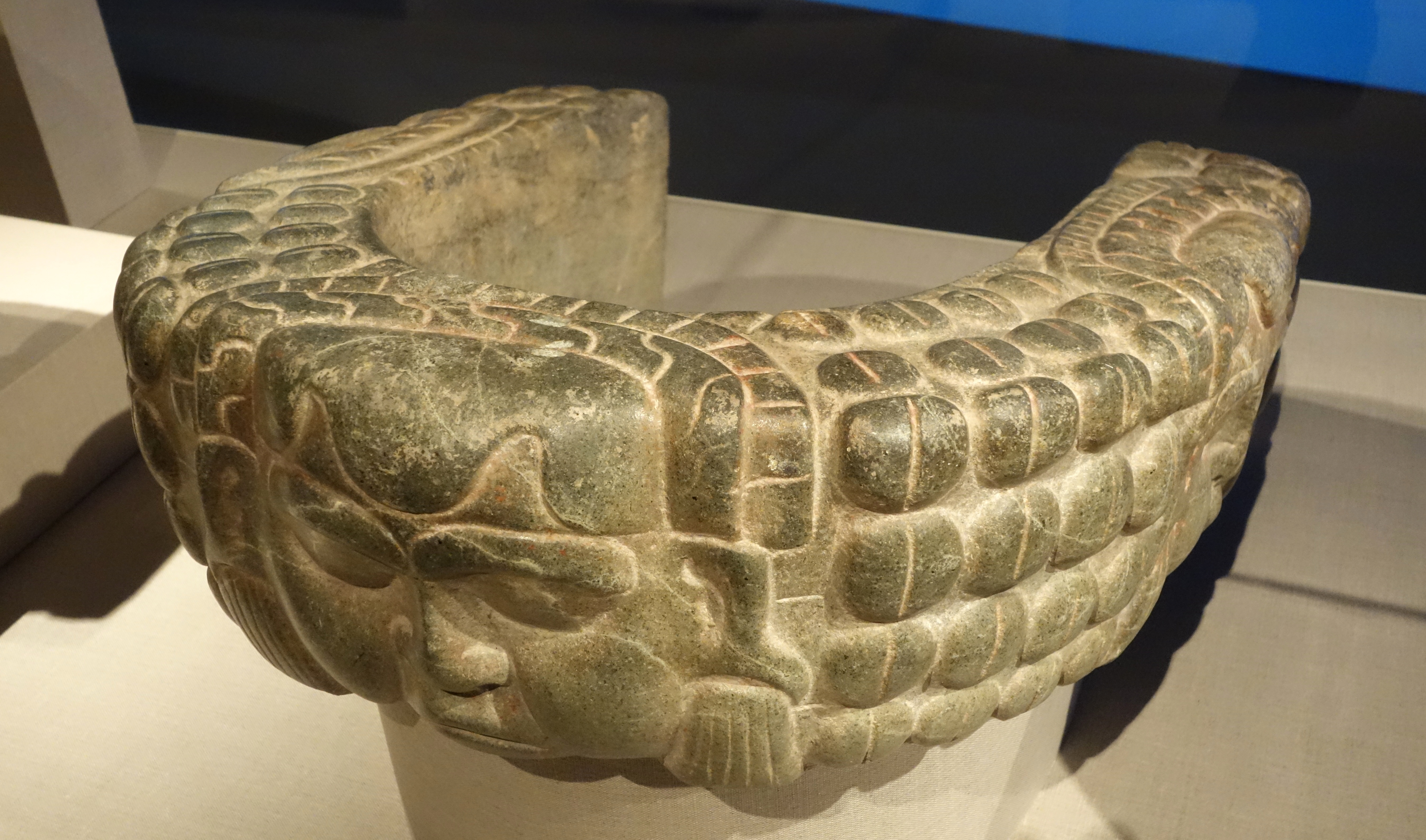
Stone commemorative yoke for the ballgame, carved with faces and cocoa bean, 750–1000 CE

== Art ==
The art of Classic Veracruz is rendered with extensive and convoluted banded scrolls that can be seen both on monumental architecture and on portable art, including ceramics and even carved bones. At least one researcher has suggested that the heads and other features formed by the scrolls are a Classic Veracruz form of pictographic writing. This scrollwork may have grown out of similar styles found in Chiapa de Corzo and Kaminaljuyu.

In addition to the scrollwork, the architecture is known for its remarkable ornamentation, such as that seen on the Pyramid of Niches at El Tajin. This ornamentation produces dramatic contrasts of light and shadow, what art historian George Kubler called a "bold chiaroscuro".

While Classic Veracruz culture shows influences from Teotihuacan and the Maya, neither of these cultures are its direct antecedents. Instead, the seeds of this culture seems to have come at least in part from the Epi-Olmec culture centers, such as Cerro de las Mesas and La Mojarra.

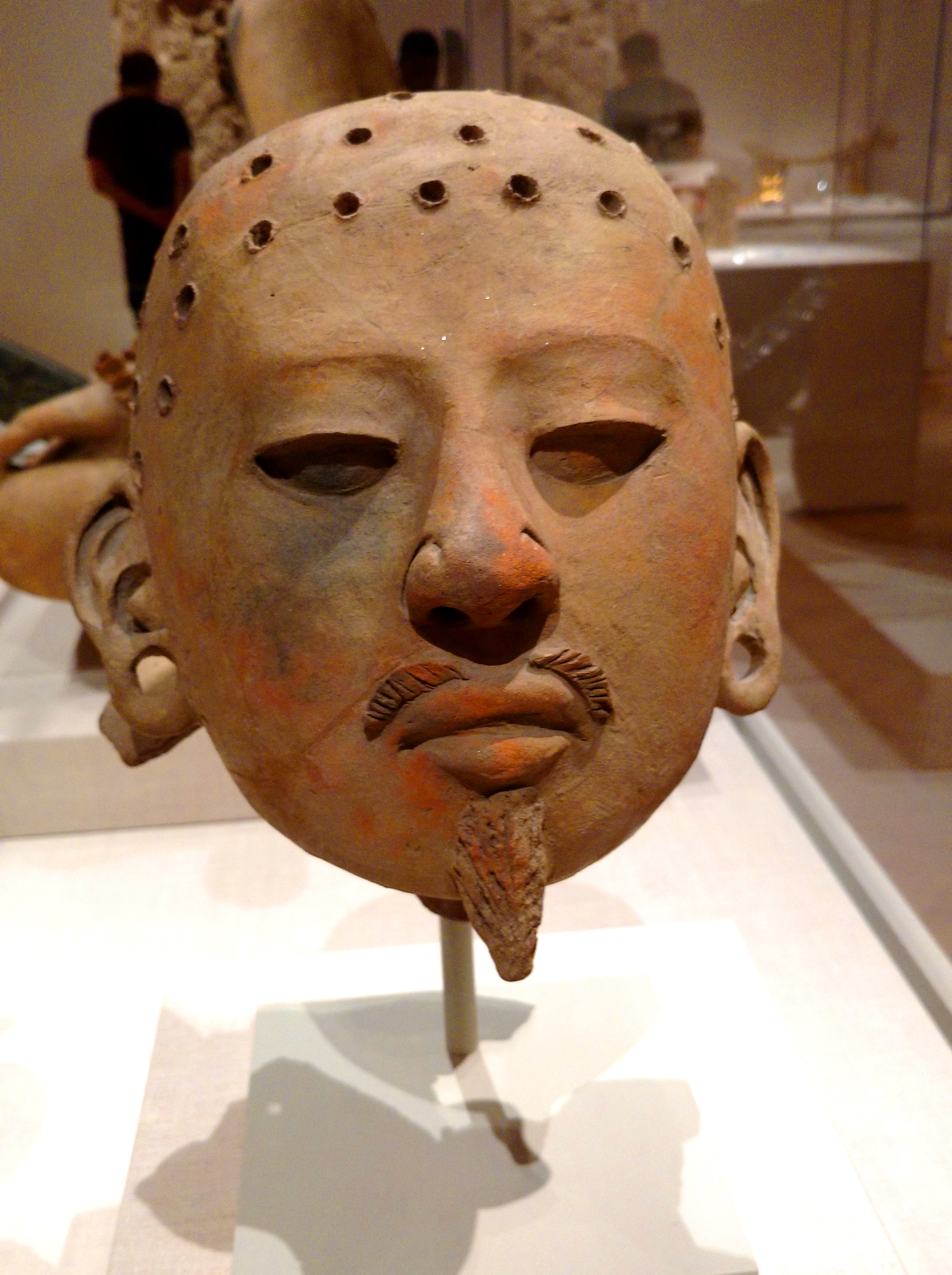
Portrait head from Remojadas, 250–550 CE

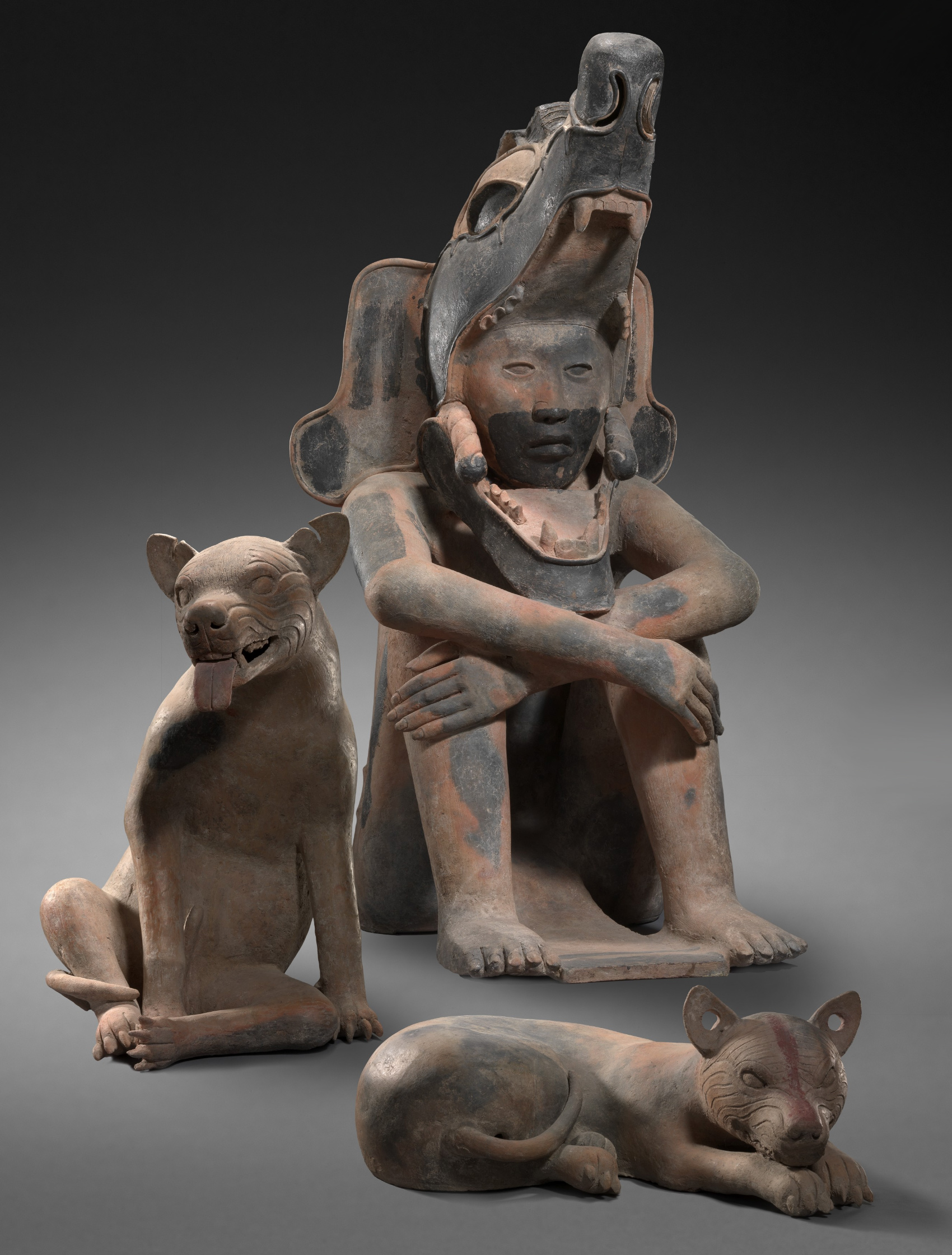
Sculptures of a seated warrior and two dogs, 400–800 CE

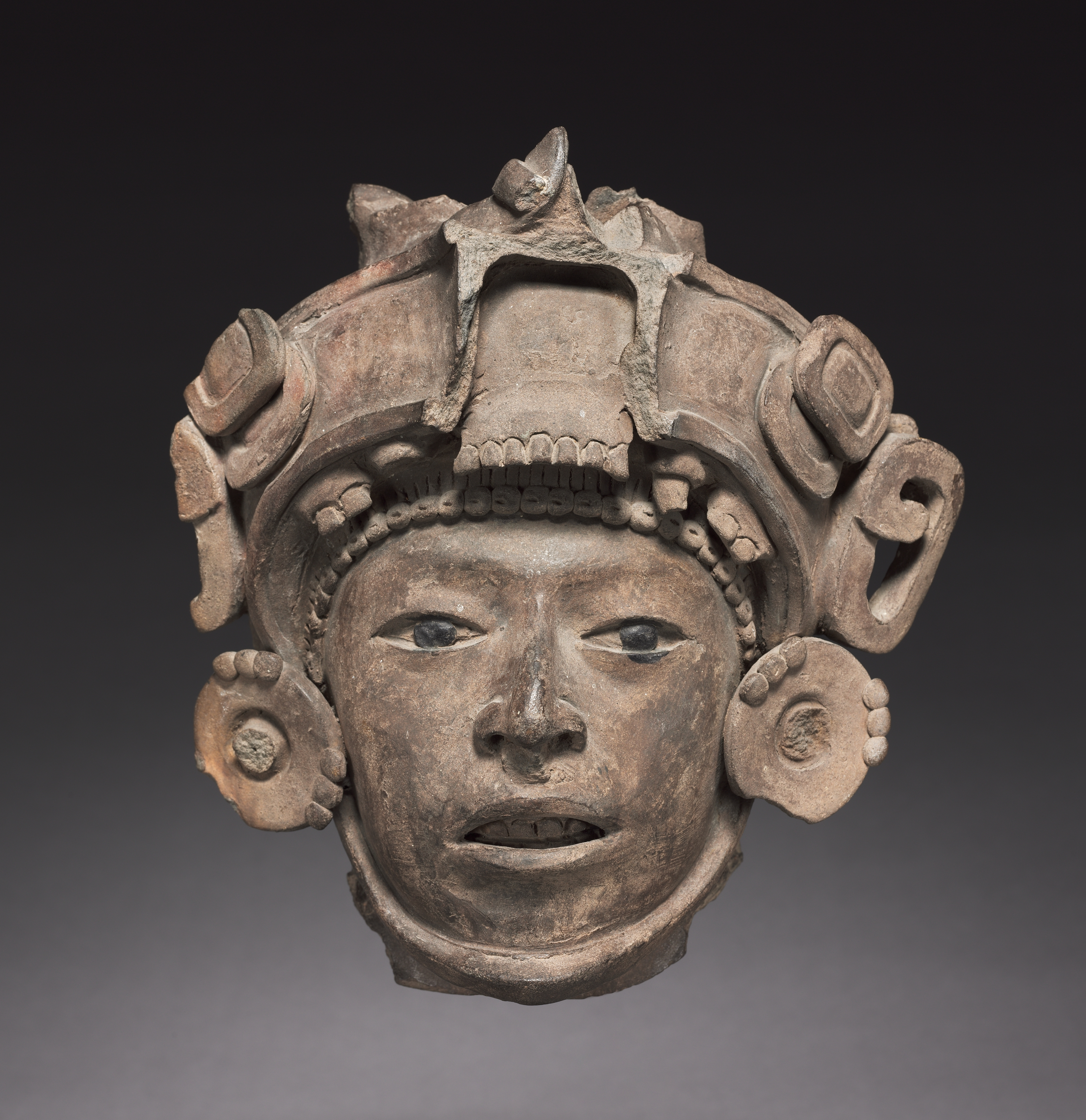
Ceramic head, 600–900 CE

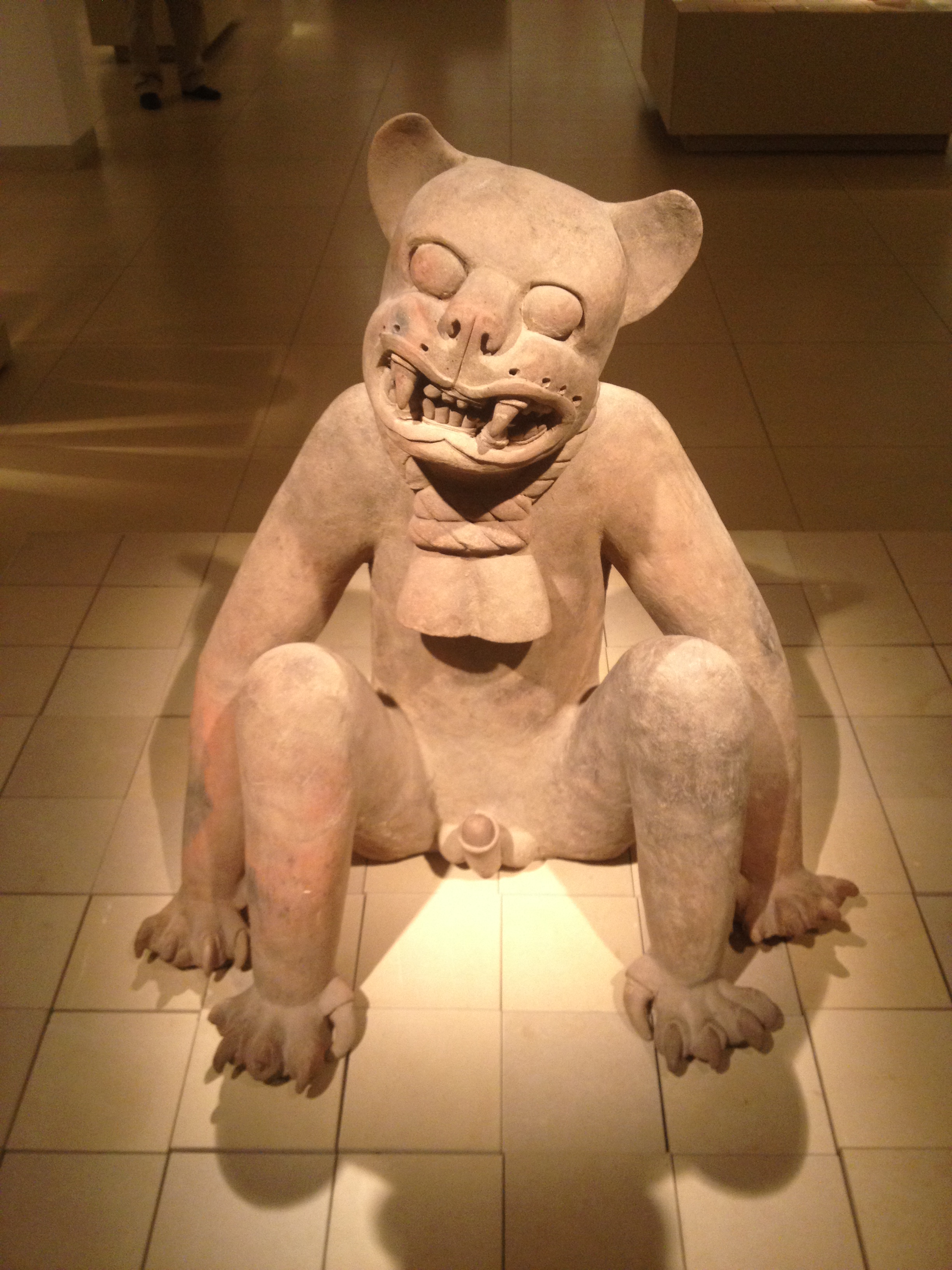
Incense burner shaped like a jaguar being, 600–900 CE

=== Ceramics ===
Until the early 1950s, the Classic Veracruz ceramics were few, little understood, and generally without provenance. Since then, the recovery of thousands of figurines and pottery pieces from sites such as Remojadas, Los Cerros, Dicha Tuerta, and Tenenexpan, some initially by looters, has expanded our understanding and filled many museum shelves. Artist and art historian Miguel Covarrubias described Classic Veracruz ceramics as "powerful and expressive, endowed with a charm and sensibility unprecedented in other, more formal cultures".

Remojadas style figurines, perhaps the most easily recognizable, are usually hand-modeled, and often adorned with appliqués. Of particular note are the Sonrientes (smiling faces) figurines, with triangular-shaped heads and outstretched arms. Nopiloa figurines are usually less ornate, without appliqués, and often molded.

The Classic Veracruz culture produced some of the few wheeled Mesoamerican figurines and is also noted for the use of bitumen for highlighting.

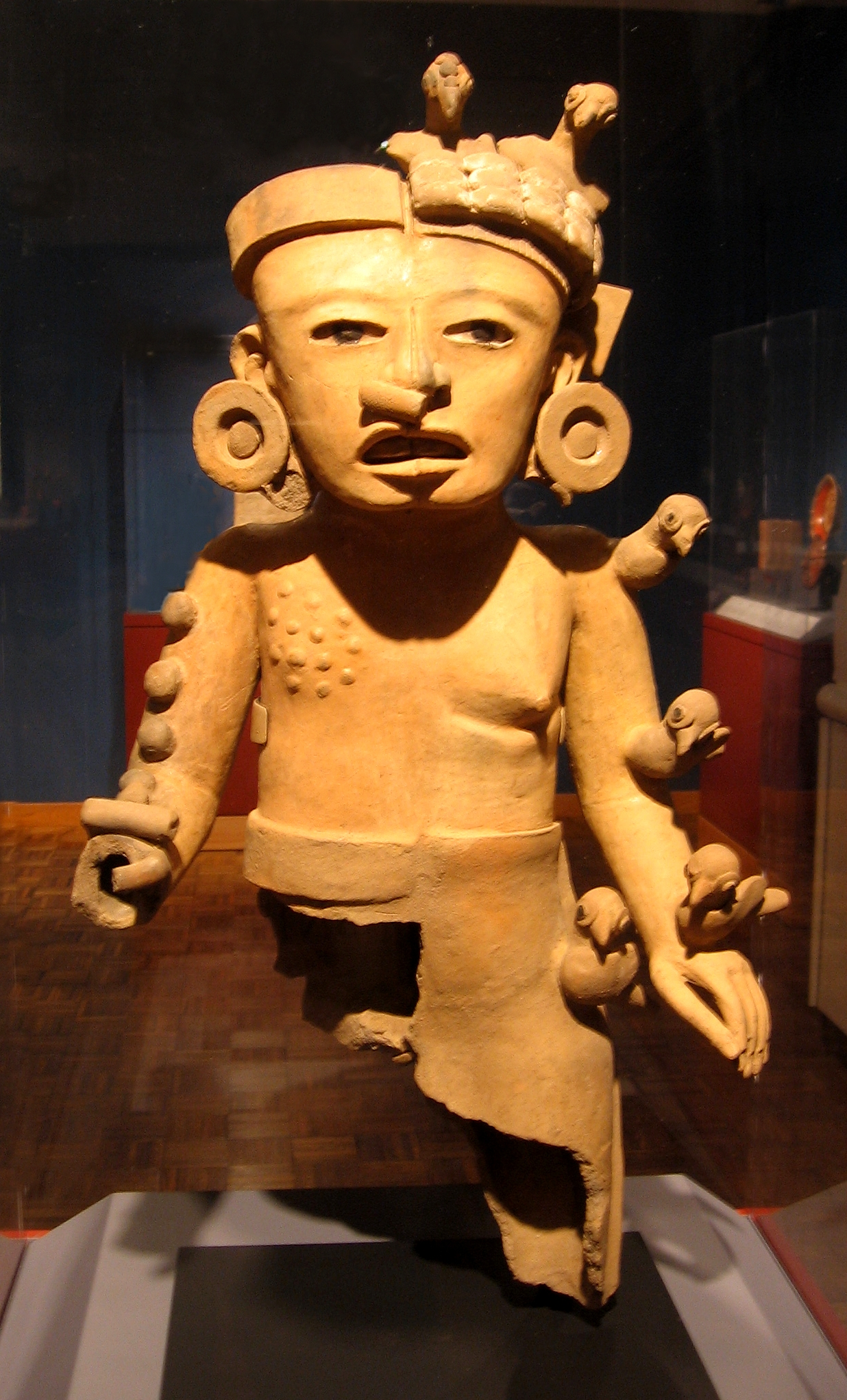
Large male/female duality figurine from Remojadas. Note the feminine breast and birds on the right side.

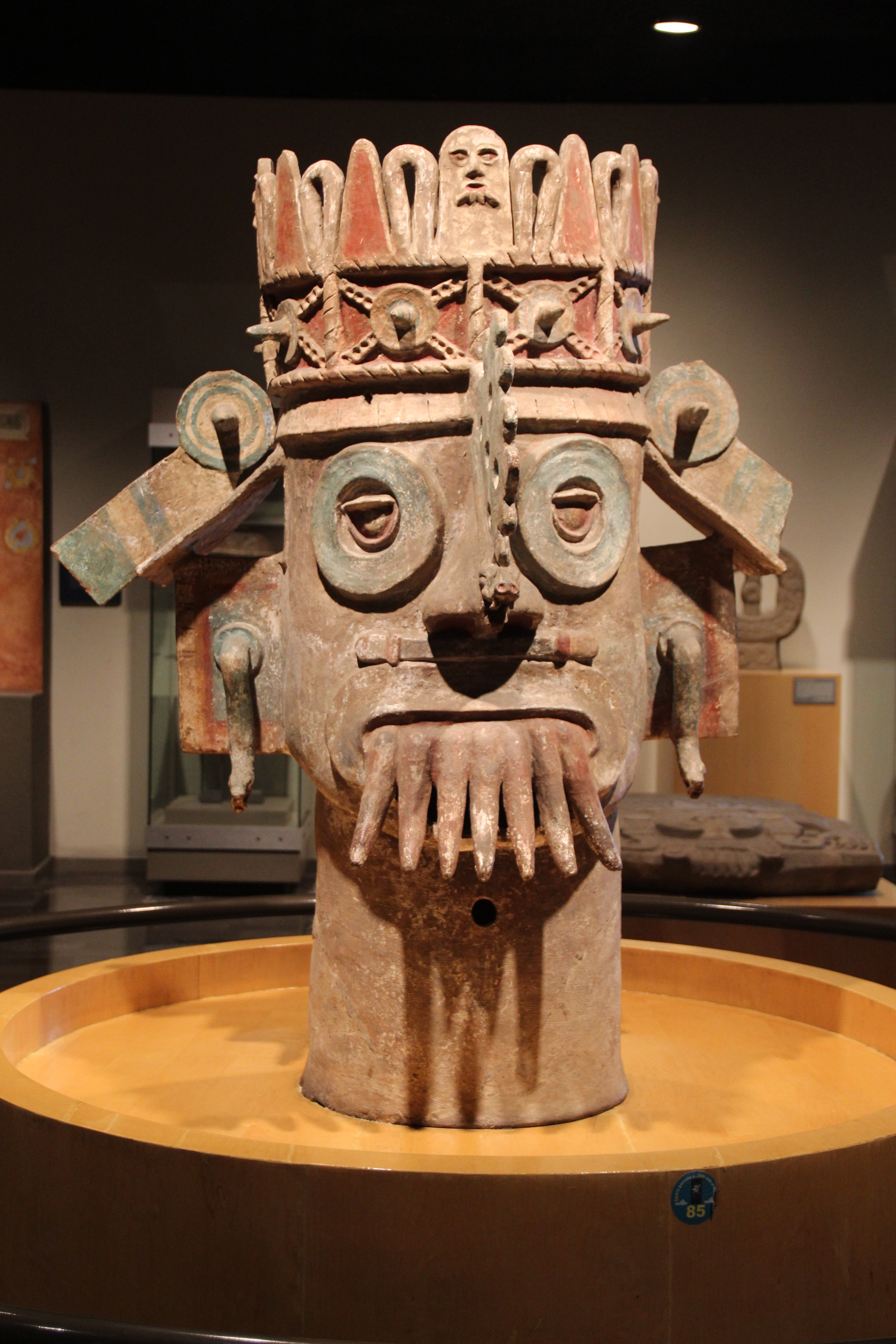
Ceramic brazier with head of Tlaloc, the rain god

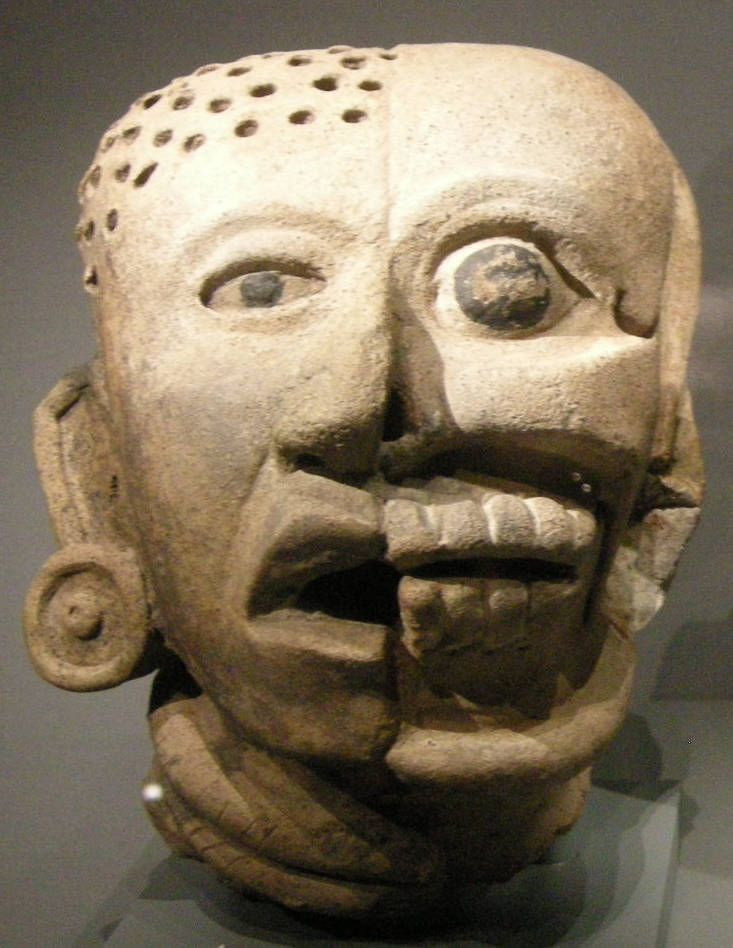
Head depicting a fleshy face on one side, and a skull on the other, 300–600 CE

== See also ==
- List of Mesoamerican pyramids
