= The Prince of Wales and Other Famous Americans =

Book by Miguel Covarrubias

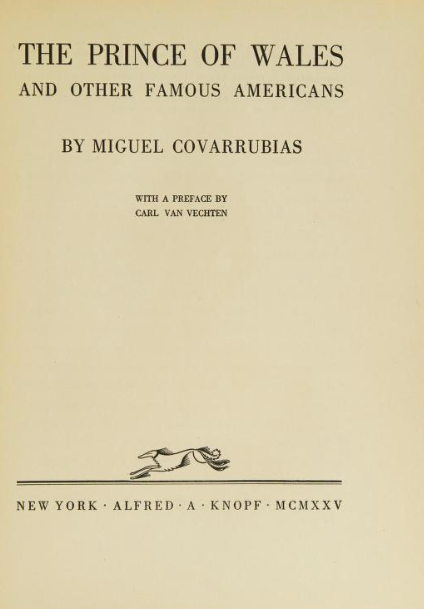
- Title page for The Prince of Wales and Other Famous Americans (1925)
- Author: Miguel Covarrubias
- Genre: Caricatures
- Publication date: 1925

The Prince of Wales and Other Famous Americans is a 1925 book by Miguel Covarrubias, a Mexican cartoonist. It is a collection of 66 black-and-white caricatures of famous American (mostly New York-based) personalities from the 1920s. The future Edward VIII, alluded to in the title, appears as the frontispiece at a race track; he had made a widely publicized visit to the United States in 1924. Many of the drawings were originally published in Vanity Fair magazine, which employed Covarrubias as a staff cartoonist.

The book's introduction is by Carl Van Vechten.

== Reception ==
The book was well received and increased Covarrubias's reputation, although a reviewer in Theatre Arts Monthly described the characterizations as "surgically cruel". Katherine Ann Porter described them as demonstrating "genius" in their "keen satirical comment", with "only one failure: Babe Ruth." The following year, William Spratling and William Faulkner published Sherwood Anderson and Other Famous Creoles, whose title Spratling later described as a parody of Covarrubias's.
