= Roar, Lion, Roar =

Fight song of Columbia University

Roar, Lion, Roar
Performed by the Empire City Six in 1957

"Roar, Lion, Roar" is the primary fight song of Columbia University. It was originally titled "Bold Buccaneers" and was written with different lyrics for the 1923 Varsity Show Half Moon Inn by Columbia undergraduates Corey Ford and Morris W. Watkins, and alumnus Roy Webb. In order to compete in the Columbia Alumni Federation's contest to find a school fight song the same year, Ford wrote a new set of lyrics that would become "Roar, Lion, Roar". The title references Columbia's mascot, the Columbia Lion.

== Lyrics ==
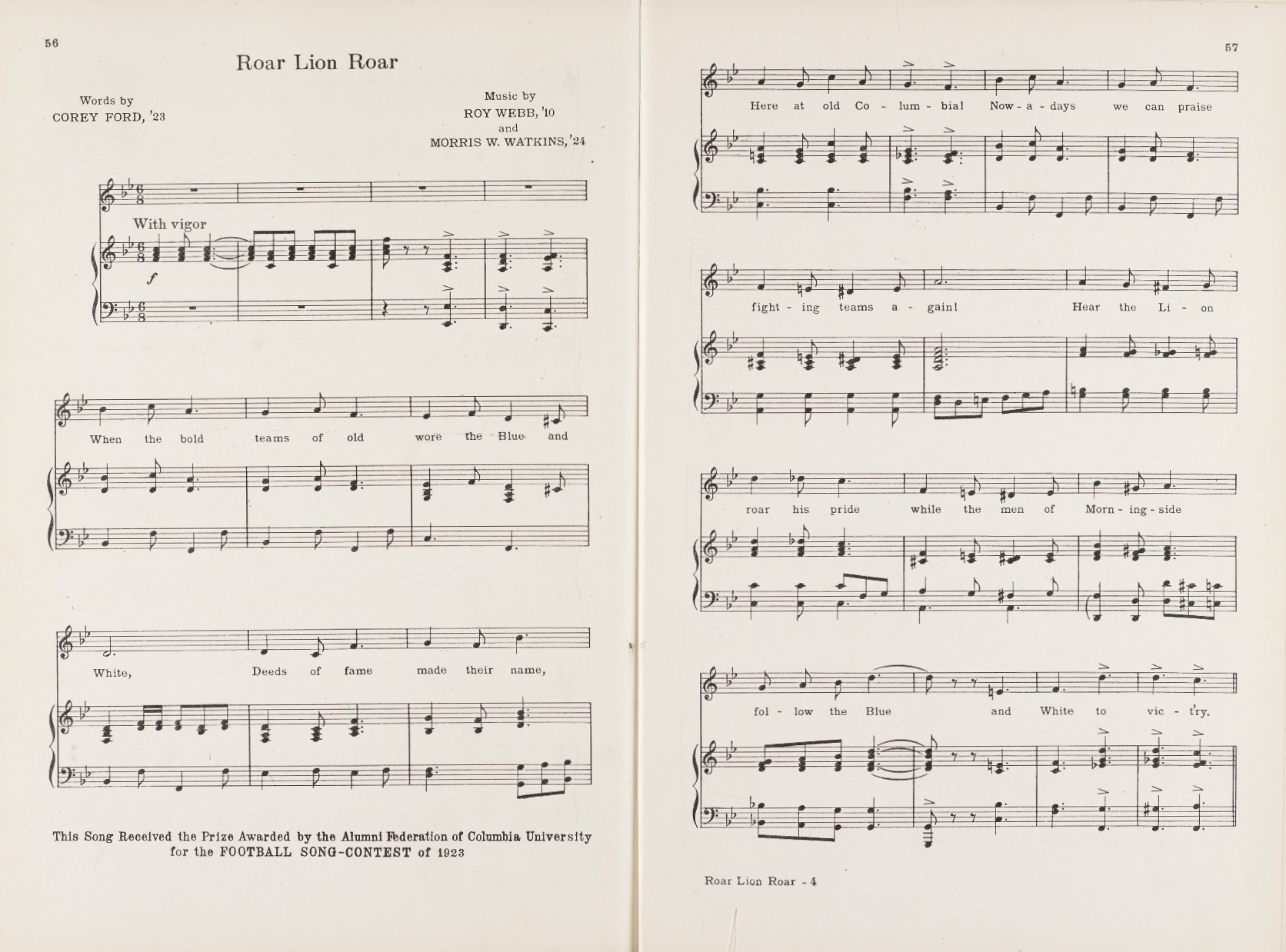
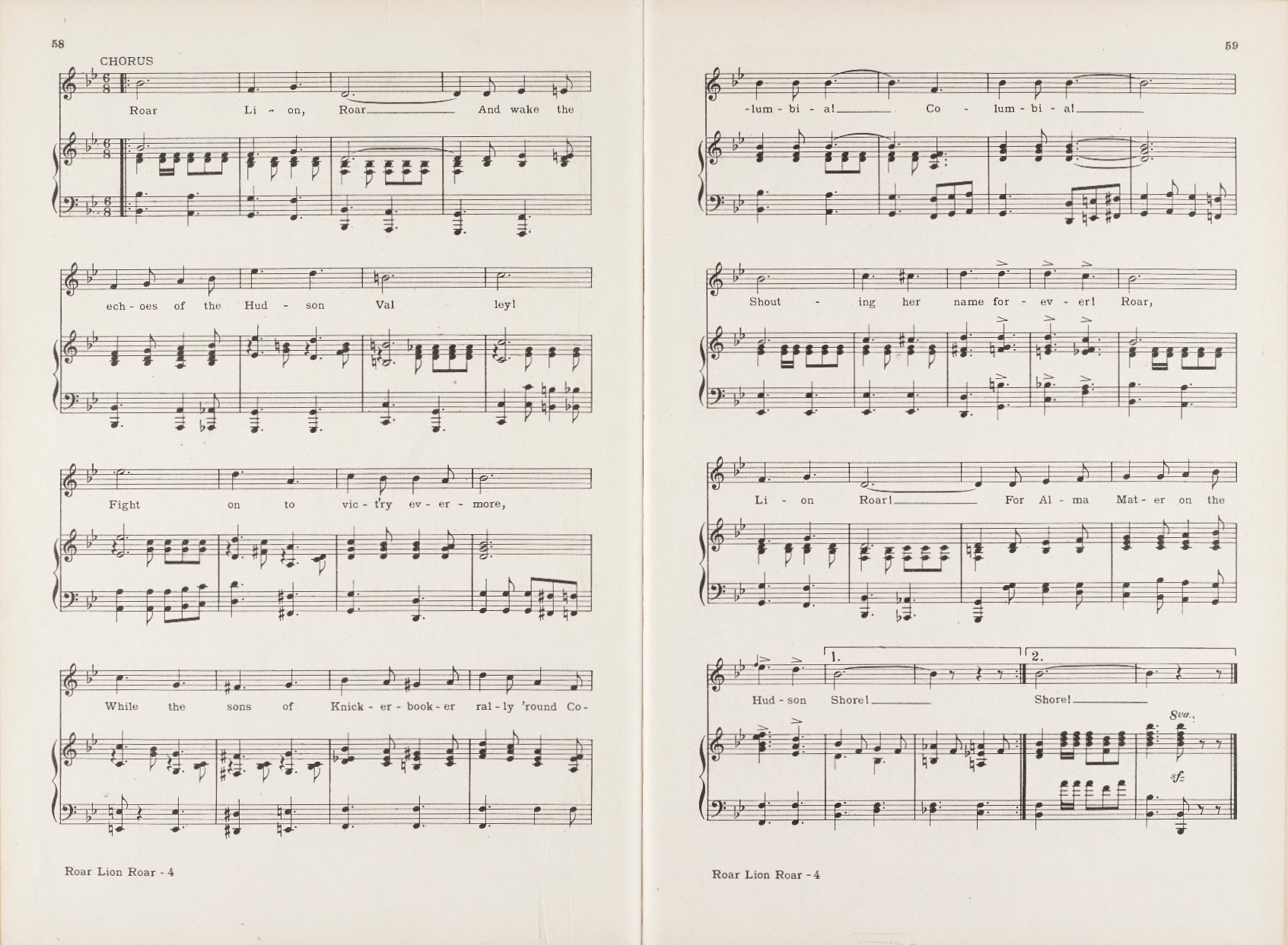
The original score for Roar, Lion, Roar from 1923, written by Corey Ford, Roy Webb, and Morris W. Watkins

The original lyrics are:

When the bold teams of old
Wore the Blue and White,
Deeds of fame made their name,
Here at old Columbia!
Nowadays we can praise
Fighting teams again!
Hear the Lion roar in pride,
While the men of Morningside
Follow the Blue and White to vict'ry.

Roar, Lion, Roar!
And wake the echoes of the Hudson Valley!
Fight on to vict'ry evermore,
While the sons of Knickerbocker rally 'round
Columbia! Columbia!
Shouting her name forever
Roar, Lion, Roar!
For Alma Mater on the Hudson Shore!

Today the song is almost always performed with only the second stanza.

== "Bold Buccaneers" ==
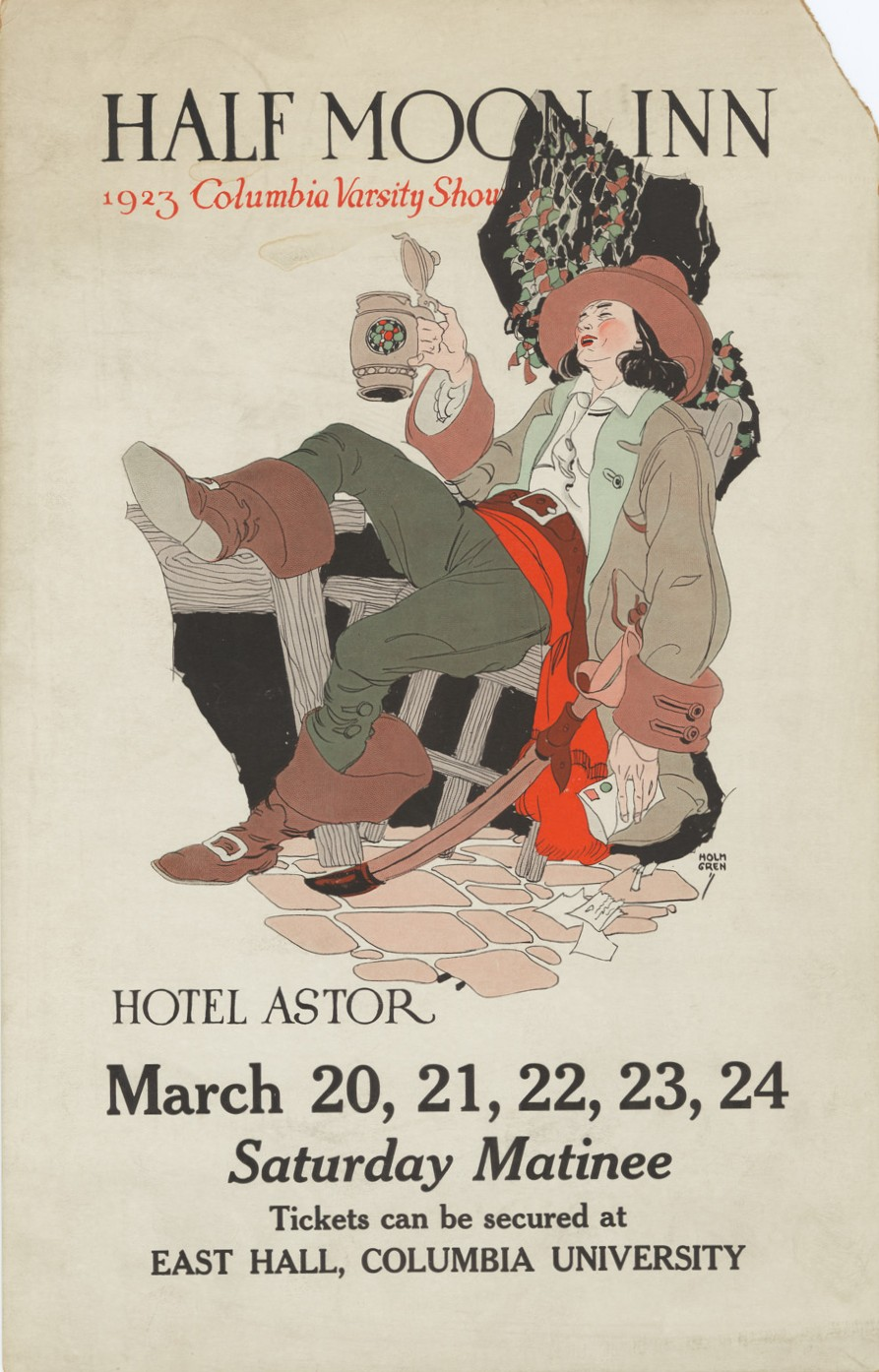
The poster for Half Moon Inn, for which the tune for "Roar, Lion, Roar" was originally written

The 1923 Varsity Show, Half Moon Inn, was based on characters from The Sketch Book of Geoffrey Crayon, Gent. by Washington Irving, including Rip Van Winkle and Hendrick Hudson, the historical explorer for whom the Hudson River is named and who discovered Hudson Strait and Hudson Bay on his ship, the Halve Maen ("Half Moon"). The play followed the misadventures of the Columbia crew team, to whom the title "Bold Buccaneers" referred to.

The lyrics for "Bold Buccaneers" are as follows:

Verse:
When the bold crews of old
Crossed the bounding main,
They would dare, anywhere,
Under Hendrik Hudson.
Nowadays we can praise
Hudson's crews again!
For the men of Morningside,
Sweep the Hudson far and wide,
Following Hudson's crew. (We hail you!)

Refrain:
Bold Buccaneers,
The crew of Hendrik Hudson found our Valley,
Down through the everlasting years
Crews of Blue and White will ever rally 'round
Columbia! Columbia!
Shouting her name forever,
Sound with our cheers
The praise of mighty Hendrik Hudson's fame.

Second Verse:
Nowadays when we race
By Poughkeepsie's shore,
You will find, close behind, the
Ghost of Hendrik Hudson!
Hear his shout ringing out:
"Pull, Columbia's oar!"
While from shady Kaatskill glen
Hendrik Hudson's sturdy men
Follow Columbia's Crew! (We hail you!)
(Repeat of refrain)

== Performers ==
- Johnny Long and his Orchestra – College Favorites (Volume 2) (1947)
- Lang-Worth Feature Programs (1950?)
- Walter Schumann – Songs of the Ivy League (1951)
- Charles Henderson Band and Glee Club – Collegiana (1960)
- The Kirby Stone Four – Get That Ball (1962)
- Annette Funicello (with The Wellingtons) – Annette on Campus (1963)
- The Norman Luboff Choir – Go Team, Go! (1964)
- William Revelli – Kick Off, U.S.A. (1964)
- The Mormon Tabernacle Choir – Hail to the Victors! (1978)
