= The John Riddell Murder Case =

1930 novel by Corey Ford

The John Riddell Murder Case: A Philo Vance Parody
- Title page for The John Riddell Murder Case: A Philo Vance Parody (1930)
- Author: Corey Ford
- Illustrator: Miguel Covarrubias
- Language: English
- Genre: Parody
- Publisher: Charles Scribner's Sons
- Publication date: 1930
- Publication place: United States
- Media type: Print (hardcover & paperback)
- Pages: 323

The John Riddell Murder Case: A Philo Vance Parody is a novel written by Corey Ford under the pseudonym of John Riddell. It was published in 1930. The book mocks a number of other best-selling books and authors of the time period.

== Plot summary ==
Acting in response to an incomprehensibly phrased note in Walter Winchell's gossip column predicting that John Riddell will be murdered at 9:00 that morning, Philo Vance alerts the police and travels with the narrator to Riddell's home, only to find that they are too late.

As might be expected from a work of parody, much of the book's humor comes from absurdities and from the ridiculous portrayals of the writings and authors caricatured. Repetition is frequently employed for comedic effect. The fourth wall is broken on several occasions, as when Philo Vance responds to Heath's suggestion that Vance believes that all of the recent best-selling authors are going to be murdered: "'Already there have been thirteen murders, and we're only at'--he glanced down swiftly--'at page 124.'" Philo Vance himself is portrayed as affecting an inconsistently cultured vocabulary and a lazy style of speaking. For example: "I've been evolvin' a rather fantastic theory, and I want to test it a trifle further."
