= Rosa Rolanda =

American multidisciplinary artist, dancer and choreographer

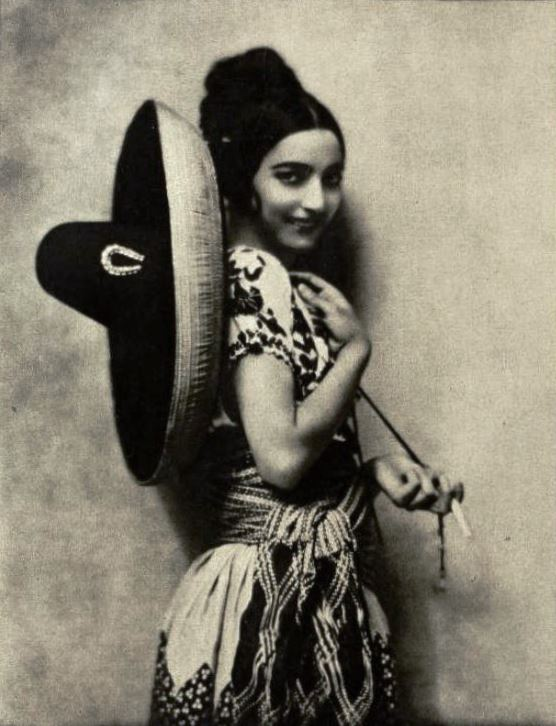
- Born: Rosemonde Cowan Ruelas; September 6, 1895; Azusa, California
- Died: March 25, 1970 (aged 74); Mexico City, Mexico
- Spouse: Miguel Covarrubias

Rosa Rolanda (Rosemonde Cowan; Rose Rolando; Mrs. Miguel Covarrubias; September 6, 1895 – March 25, 1970) was an American multidisciplinary artist, dancer, and choreographer.

== Biography ==
Rolanda was born in Azusa, California, in 1895. Her father, Henry Charles Cowan, was an engineer and her mother, Guadalupe Ruelas, was of Mexican descent.

Rolanda began her artistic career in New York in 1916, as a celebrated dancer in Broadway revues. Rolanda's debut performance was to Lee Shubert's Over the Top, which sparked a continued dance career throughout the 1920s. After a tour in Europe with the Ziegfeld Follies dance troupe, Rolanda performed in the musical Around the Town.

Soon after, while working on The Garrick Gaieties, Rolanda met Miguel Covarrubias on set. They began a romantic relationship in 1924, and in the following year the couple traveled to Mexico, where Rolanda began photography. Albums of her images were published in Covarrubias's best-selling books Island of Bali (1938) and Mexico South: Isthmus of Tehuantepec (1946), and her work was also featured in the "Ameridinian" issue of Wolfgang Paalen's journal DYN, published in 1943. During the late 1920s or early 1930s, Rolanda experimented with photograms, creating significant series of surrealist self-portraits that may have been influenced by Man Ray, who photographed Rolanda in Paris in 1923.

She probably began painting around 1926. The majority of Rolanda's canvases depict colorful, folkloric scenes of children and festivals, portraits of friends such as the movie actresses Dolores del Río and María Félix, and self-portraits.

Rolanda and Covarrubias married in 1930, and by 1935 they had permanently settled into his family home in Tizapan El Alto, close to Mexico City.

In 1952, Rolanda exhibited her paintings in a solo show at the prominent Galeria Souza in Mexico City. By that year, she and Covarrubias were separated and Rolanda was producing works such as Autorretrato (self-portrait), conveying her innermost turmoil onto canvas.

She died in 1970 in Mexico City, Mexico.

== Filmography ==
- The Blue Bird (1918)
- Woman (1918)
