= Corey Ford =

American humorist and writer (1902–1969)

Corey Ford (April 29, 1902 – July 27, 1969) was an American humorist, writer, outdoorsman, and screenwriter. He was friendly with several members of the Algonquin Round Table in New York City and occasionally lunched there.

== Early years ==
Ford was a member of the Class of 1923 at Columbia College of Columbia University, where he edited the humor magazine Jester of Columbia, and wrote the Varsity Show Half Moon Inn and Columbia's primary fight song, "Roar, Lion, Roar". He also joined, and was expelled from, the Philolexian Society.

== Career ==
Failing to graduate, he embarked on a career as a freelance writer and humorist. In the 1930s he was noted for satirical sketches of books and authors penned under the name "John Riddell". Theodore Dreiser was shown adopting the guise of a common workman building his newest and biggest novel from bricks and mortar. He reviewed Dead Lovers are Faithful Lovers as "Dead Novelists are Good Novelists."

Ford's series of "Impossible Interviews" for Vanity Fair magazine featured ill-assorted celebrities, among them Stalin vs. John D. Rockefeller, Chief Justice Charles Evans Hughes vs. Al Capone, Sigmund Freud vs. Jean Harlow, Sally Rand vs. Martha Graham, Gertrude Stein vs. Gracie Allen, Adolf Hitler vs. Huey Long.

Ford published 30 books and more than 500 magazine articles, many of them marked with a gregarious sense of humor, a love of dogs, and "underdogs." He told many stories of the literary scene in the twenties, of headhunters in Dutch Borneo, and of U.S. airmen in combat during World War II. He loved conversation and comradeship and was a great listener as well.

Ford created the name Eustace Tilley for the dandyish, top-hatted symbol of The New Yorker magazine. According to Ford's memoir, The Time of Laughter, the last name came from a maiden aunt and he chose the first name "for euphony".

Ford wrote a monthly column, "The Lower Forty Hunting, Shooting and Inside Straight Club", for Field & Stream for almost 20 years in the 1950s and 1960s. The column told about a fictional group of New England sportsmen, detailing the club members' adventures in and around the town of Hardscrabble, Vermont. The primary characters in the column were Colonel Cobb, Judge Parker, Cousin Sid, Uncle Perk, Doc Hall, and Mister McNabb. The columns have been anthologized into several books such as Minutes of the Lower Forty, Uncle Perk's Jug, and The Corey Ford Sporting Treasury.

== Personal life ==
Ford lived in Hanover, New Hampshire in the 1950s and 1960s and sponsored the Dartmouth Boxing Club (there was no sanctioned Dartmouth Boxing Team). Members of the club trained in Ford's basement where he built a gym with a boxing ring, light and heavy bags, and boxing gloves. He also built a basement locker room for club members. A Dartmouth art professor, a friend of Ford's, would recruit artist models from members of the Dartmouth Boxing Club.

== Bibliography ==
=== Books ===
- Forey, Cord (1925). Three rousing cheers for the Rollo Boys.
- — (1926). The gazelle's ears. New York: George H. Doran.
- — (1928). Meaning no offense: being some of the life, adventures and opinions of Trader Riddell. Illustrated by Miguel Covarrubias. New York: John Day.
- Triplett, June (1929). Salt water taffy: or, Twenty thousand leagues away from the sea: the almost incredible autobiography of Capt. Ezra Triplett's seafaring daughter. New York: G. P. Putnam's Sons.
- Riddell, John (1930). The John Riddell murder case : a Philo Vance parody. Illustrated by Miguel Covarrubias. New York: Charles Scribner's Sons.
- Forey, Cord (1931). Coconut oil. New York: Brewer, Warren & Putnam.
- Riddell, John (1932). In the worst possible taste. Illustrated by Miguel Covarrubias. New York: Charles Scribner's Sons.
- Forey, Cord (1943). From the ground up. New York: Charles Scribner's Sons.
- — (1943). Short cut to Tokyo : the battle for the Aleutians. New York: Charles Scribner's Sons.
- Balchen, Bernt; Corey Ford & Oliver La Farge (1944). War below zero : the battle for Greenland. Boston: Houghton Mifflin.
- Forey, Cord (1946). Cloak and dagger.
- The Last Time I Saw Them, 1946
- Horse of Another Color, 1946
- A Man Of His Own, 1949
- How To Guess Your Age, 1950
- The Office Party, 1951
- Every Dog Should Have A Man, 1952
- Never Say Diet, 1954
- Has Anybody Seen Me Lately?, 1958
- You Can Always Tell A Fisherman(but can't tell him much), 1958
- The Day Nothing Happened, 1959
- Guide To Thimking, 1961
- What Every Bachelor Knows, 1961
- Minutes of the Lower Forty, 1962
- And How Do We Feel This Morning?, 1964
- Uncle Perk's Jug, 1964
- A Peculiar Service, 1965
- Where The Sea Breaks Its Back, 1966
- The Time of Laughter, 1967
- Donovan of OSS, 1970 (posthumously)

=== Essays, reporting and other short pieces ===
- Ford, Corey (February 21, 1925). "Highlights". The New Yorker. 1 (1): 15.
- — (February 28, 1925). "Highlights". The New Yorker. 1 (2): 23.
- — (March 21, 1925). "Highlights". The New Yorker. 1 (5): 26.
- — (March 28, 1925). "Inspiration". The New Yorker. 1 (6): 31.
- — (May 2, 1925). "Bearding the Leyendecker: a study of creative art in New York". The New Yorker. 1 (11): 20.
- — (May 9, 1925). "Blotters: an absorbing medium: a study of creative art in New York". The New Yorker. 1 (12): 22.
- — (May 16, 1925). "Laundry art: study in wash: further investigation of creative art in New York". The New Yorker. 1 (13): 22.
- — (May 16, 1925). "The tie that blinds". The New Yorker. 1 (13): 29.
- — (May 23, 1925). "Probing public murals: a further study of creative art in New York". The New Yorker. 1 (14): 22.
- — (May 30, 1925). "Sand: Impressionism : a further study of creative art in New York". The New Yorker. 1 (15): 22.
- — (June 6, 1925). "Shattered glass : a fugitive art in New York". The New Yorker. 1 (16): 16.
- [Uncredited] (January 2, 1926). "XX. The building". The Making of a Magazine. The New Yorker. 1 (46): 24.
- Ford, Corey (July 1926). "The feminine touch". The Shrine. 1 (3): 57-?.

== Filmography ==
- The Sophomore (1929) aka Compromised in the UK
- The Sport Parade (1932)
- The Half-Naked Truth (1932)
- Her Bodyguard (1933)
- Topper Takes a Trip (1938)
- Start Cheering (1938)
- Remember? (1939)
- Winter Carnival (1939)
- Zenobia (1939) aka Elephants Never Forget in the UK, and It's Spring Again in the US
- Cloak and Dagger (1946)
