= List of Guggenheim Fellowships awarded in 1928 =

Seventy-five fellowships were awarded to artists, academics, and scholars from more than 20 states. At least 15 previous winners had their fellowships extended. $173,000 was disbursed.

== 1928 Fellows ==
Category	Field of Study	Fellow	Institutional association	Research topic	Notes	Ref
Creative Arts	Drama and Performance Art	Paul Green		Theater and drama of Continental Europe for the purpose of gaining technical training	Also won in 1929	
Creative Arts	Drama and Performance Art	Lynn Riggs		Wrote Green Grow the Lilacs (opened 1930)		
Creative Arts	Fiction	Eric Derwent Walrond		Writing	Also won in 1929	
Creative Arts	Fine Arts	Anthony Angarola	Kansas City Art Institute	Painting		
Creative Arts	Fine Arts	William Auerbach-Levy	Educational Alliance	Etching and painting		
Creative Arts	Fine Arts	Isamu Noguchi	University of California	Sculpture	Also won in 1927	
Creative Arts	Fine Arts	Eliot O'Hara		Painting		
Creative Arts	Fine Arts	Doris Spiegel		Drawing and painting; studying street types in France and Italy		
Creative Arts	Fine Arts	Raymond Turner		Sculpture		
Creative Arts	Music Composition	Robert Russell Bennett		Composed Abraham Lincoln and Sights and Sounds	Also won in 1929	
Creative Arts	Music Composition	Roy Harris	University of California	Composing	Also won in 1927 and 1976	
Creative Arts	Music Composition	Quinto Maganini	University of California	Working on an epic symphony about the life and era of Napoleon I and on an opera based on Bret Harte's The Bellringer of Angels	Also won in 1929	
Creative Arts	Music Composition	Carl McKinley		Composing	Also won in 1927	
Creative Arts	Music Composition	Bernard Rogers		Composing	Also won in 1927	
Creative Arts	Poetry	Léonie Adams		Poetry writing and translation of François Villon's lyrics	Also won in 1929	
Creative Arts	Poetry	Countee Cullen		Narrative poems and the libretto for an opera		
Creative Arts	Poetry	Allen Tate		Writing	Also won in 1929	
Humanities	American Literature	Robert Ernest Spiller	Swarthmore College	Writings of James Fennimore Cooper and other studies in the influence of English and other European cultures on the earliest period of American literature in London		
Humanities	Architecture, Planning, & Design	Kenneth John Conant	Harvard University	Drawings of the restorations of the French Romanesque churches, including the Abbey Church in Cluny, the Church of St. Mary in Tours, and the Church of St. Martial at Limoges	Also won in 1926, 1929, 1930, and 1954	
Humanities	Architecture, Planning, & Design	Myron Bement Smith	Yale University	Brick and stonework	Also won in 1927	
Humanities	British History	Donald Grove Barnes	University of Oregon at Eugene	Henry Pelham, emphasizing Pelham's part in the administration of Walpole and the significance in English history of his own ministry from 1743 to 1754		
Humanities	Classics	Rachel Louise Sargent	North Central College	Social and economic life of Ancient Greece, especially slavery		
Humanities	Classics	Rodney Potter Robinson	University of Cincinnati	Completion of Palaeographia Iberica by John Miller Burnham		
Humanities	English Literature	John William Draper	University of Maine	Graveyard School of 18th century poetry	Also won in 1927	
Humanities	English Literature	John DeLancey Ferguson	Ohio Wesleyan University	Preparation of a complete text edition of the Letters of Robert Burns, re-edited from the original manuscripts		
Humanities	English Literature	Thurman Losson Hood	Harvard University	Compiling and editing for publication a volume of the uncollected letters of Robert Browning		
Humanities	English Literature	Glenn Arthur Hughes	University of Washington, Seattle	The imagist and related movements in poetry		
Humanities	English Literature	Alan Dugald McKillop	Rice Institute	Samuel Richardson		
Humanities	English Literature	Thomas Middleton Raysor	State College of Washington	Preparation of a corrected edition of S. T. Coleridge's lectures and marginalia on Shakespeare and other literary remains	Also won in 1926	
Humanities	English Literature	Helen Constance White	University of Wisconsin, Madison	Mystical elements in the religious poetry of 17th-century England	Also won in 1930	
Humanities	English Literature	Louis Booker Wright	University of North Carolina	Reflection of contemporary ideas in English drama before 1642	Also won in 1929	
Humanities	French History	E. Malcolm Carroll	Duke University	Influence of public opinion upon the foreign policy of the Third French Republic	Also won in 1927	
Humanities	French History	Louis R. Gottschalk	University of Louisville	Career and influence of General Lafayette, specifically on the several revolutionary movements with which he was connected	Also won in 1954	
Humanities	French Literature	Edith Philips	Goucher College	Quaker and Quaker ideas in French Literature with particular reference to the eighteenth century		
Humanities	General Nonfiction	Felix M. Morley	The Baltimore Sun	Operation of the League of Nations	Also won in 1929	
Humanities	General Nonfiction	Nathaniel Peffer		Old and established Eastern civilizations of the impact of industrialism and nationalism, the two principal products of the West brought to the East	Also won in 1927	
Humanities	Medieval Literature	Harry Caplan	Cornell University	History of medieval theories of rhetoric	Also won in 1956	
Humanities	Medieval Literature	Roland Mitchell Smith	Wesleyan University	Historical and legal literature of ancient Ireland	Also won in 1929	
Humanities	Medieval History	Carl Stephenson	University of Wisconsin	Preparing for publication of a volume of studies in municipal history		
Humanities	Music Research	Nicholas G.J. Ballanta		Musical conception of the African peoples and a comparison of that conception with the older systems of music in Europe	Also won in 1927	
Humanities	Philosophy	Sidney Hook	New York University		Also won in 1929 and 1953	
Humanities	Religion	Robert Pierce Casey	University of Cincinnati	Preparation of critical editions of the texts of St. Athanasius and of Titus of Bostra	Also won in 1929	
Humanities	Renaissance History	Albert Hyma	University of Michigan	The youth of Erasmus		
Humanities	South Asian Studies	W. Norman Brown	University of Pennsylvania	Legends and history centering around the Jainist saga Kalaka as preserved in Sanskrit and Prakrit texts, the texts themselves, and the art of the paintings illustrating certain manuscripts of these texts		
Humanities	Spanish and Portuguese Literature	Charles E. Kany	University of California	Life in Madrid during the 18th century		
Humanities	Spanish and Portuguese Literature	Antonio García Solalinde	University of Wisconsin			
Humanities	United States History	Theodore C. Blegen	University of Minnesota	Norwegian immigration to the United States		
Humanities	United States History	Curtis Putnam Nettels	University of Wisconsin			
Natural Sciences	Astronomy and Astrophysics	Willem Jacob Luyten	Harvard University	Comparing photographs of the southern sky using the Bruce telescope to those with similar plates taken between 1896 and 1905	Also won in 1929 and 1937	
Natural Sciences	Astronomy and Astrophysics	Otto Struve	University of Chicago			
Natural Sciences	Chemistry	George Hopkins Coleman	University of Iowa			
Natural Sciences	Chemistry	Earl C. Gilbert				
Natural Sciences	Earth Science	Perry Byerly	University of California	American earthquakes	Also won in 1952	
Natural Sciences	Engineering	Lester E. Reukema	University of California	Electric discharge in gases at high frequencies and the breakdown of solid insulating materials under high electric stress		
Natural Sciences	Mathematics	Olive C. Hazlett			Also won in 1929	
Natural Sciences	Medicine and Health	William Vernon Cone	Columbia University	Reactions of the intestinal cells of the central nervous system and related subjects		
Natural Sciences	Medicine and Health	Robert Richard Dieterle	University of Michigan			
Natural Sciences	Medicine and Health	John Charnley McKinley	University of Minnesota	Human muscle tonus and the relation of tonus measurements to electromyography		
Natural Sciences	Medicine and Health	Warren Kidwell Stratman-Thomas	University of Wisconsin	Therapeutic value of six new arsenical compounds in the chemo-therapy of sleeping sickness in animals and men	Also won in 1929	
Natural Sciences	Organismic Biology and Ecology	Ralph Erskine Cleland	Goucher College	Chromosome constitution and behavior in the evening primroses in relation to certain genetical problems	Also won in 1927	
Natural Sciences	Organismic Biology and Ecology	Emmett Reid Dunn	Smith College	Central American reptiles and amphibians, and salamanders of the Ambystomatidae family		
Natural Sciences	Organismic Biology and Ecology	Dwight Elmer Minnich	University of Minnesota and American Society of Zoologists	Chemical senses of insects		
Natural Sciences	Organismic Biology and Ecology	Homer William Smith	University of Virginia	Certain rare species of lung fishes which live in the waters of the Nile River and the Mediterranean Sea	Also won in 1930	
Natural Sciences	Physics	John Joseph Hopfield	University of California	Spectra of oxygen and nitrogen		
Natural Sciences	Physics	Roy J. Kennedy	California Institute of Technology	Establishment of a consistent theory of radiation	Also won in 1929	
Natural Sciences	Physics	Noel Charlton Little	Bowdoin College	Thermomagnetic properties of gaseous molecules by a new method of convective flow with the view of studying their structure and spatial quantization		
Natural Sciences	Physics	Francis Wheeler Loomis				
Natural Sciences	Physics	William Weldon Watson	University of Chicago	Structure of molecules and the nature of chemical reactions in gases		
Natural Sciences	Plant Science	Richard Bradfield			Also won in 1927	
Natural Sciences	Plant Science	Rodney Beecher Harvey	University of Minnesota	Winter hardiness of plans of northern Russia	Also won in 1927	
Social Sciences	Anthropology and Cultural Studies	Edwin Meyer Loeb	University of California	Primitive peoples of Sumatra and adjacent western islands		
Social Sciences	Anthropology and Cultural Studies	Robert H. Pfeiffer				
Social Sciences	Economics	Lionel Danforth Edie	University of Chicago		Also won in 1929	
Social Sciences	Economics	Alvin Harvey Hansen	University of Minnesota	Economic readjustment in Germany, 1920-1927		
Social Sciences	Political Science	Leonard Dupee White			Also won in 1927	

== See also ==
- Guggenheim Fellowship
- List of Guggenheim Fellowships awarded in 1927
- List of Guggenheim Fellowships awarded in 1929
