= List of Guggenheim Fellowships awarded in 1929 =

Eighty-eight American scholars, scientists, and artists were awarded Guggenheim Fellowships in 1929. Twenty-six of the grants were renewals and $180,000 was disbursed. The winners represented 37 institutions. University of California had the most recipients on its faculty (5), followed by University of Minnesota (4) and University of Illinois (3).

== 1929 U.S. and Canadian Fellows ==
Category	Field of Study	Fellow	Institutional association	Research topic	Notes	Ref
Creative Arts	Drama and Performance Art	Paul Green	University of North Carolina	European theater and creative dramatic work	Also won in 1928	
Creative Arts	Fiction	Eric Derwent Walrond		Writing	Also won in 1928	
Creative Arts	Fine Arts	Mordi Gassner		Painting	Also won in 1930	
Creative Arts	Fine Arts	J. Barry Greene		Painting		
Creative Arts	Fine Arts	John Theodore Johnson		Painting		
Creative Arts	Fine Arts	Sidney Loeb		Sculpture	Also won in 1930	
Creative Arts	Fine Arts	E. Bruce Moore	University of Wichita	Sculpture	Also won in 1930	
Creative Arts	Fine Arts	Archibald John Motley Jr.		Painting	Also won in 1930	
Creative Arts	Fine Arts	Jacob Getlar Smith		Painting		
Creative Arts	Music Composition	Robert Russell Bennett		Composing	Also won in 1928	
Creative Arts	Music Composition	Robert Mills Delaney		Composing	Also won in 1930	
Creative Arts	Music Composition	Quinto Maganini		Composition of an epic symphony for grand orchestra on the life and era of Napoleon I, a second sonata for violin and piano, and work on an opera based on Bret Harte's The Bellringer of Angels	Also won in 1928	
Creative Arts	Music Composition	Quincy Porter		Composing	Also won in 1930	
Creative Arts	Music Composition	Randall Thompson	Wellesley College	Composing	Also won in 1930	
Creative Arts	Poetry	Léonie Adams		Writing; translation of lyrics by François Villon	Also won in 1928	
Creative Arts	Poetry	Allen Tate		Writing	Also won in 1928	
Humanities	Architecture, Planning, & Design	Kenneth John Conant	Harvard University	Restoration drawings of Cluny Abbey, the Basilica of Saint Martin, Tours, and the Abbey of Saint Martial, Limoges, all Romanesque French churches	Also won in 1926, 1928, 1930, 1954	
Humanities	British History	Dorothy Stimson	Goucher College	Relation of ecclesiasticism in England to the early scientific thought of the 17th and early 18th centuries		
Humanities	British History	Judith Blow Williams	Wellesley College	Efforts in England to open markets for the products of the Industrial Revolution	Also won in 1927	
Humanities	Classics	Marion Elizabeth Blake	Mt. Holyoke College	Republican and Augustan pavements of Italy	Also won in 1927 and 1953	
Humanities	Classics	Prentice Duell	Bryn Mawr College	Etruscan painting of the 5th century B.C.; production of archaeologically accurate copies in color of the wall paintings in the most preserved tombs of the period		
Humanities	English Literature	Louis I. Bredvold	University of Michigan	Intellectual biography of John Dryden, his relation to the new science, religious controversies, political currents, and in general to 17th-century thought		
Humanities	English Literature	Ford Keeler Brown	St. John's College, Annapolis	Ideas and life of Hannah More as an unusual representative of conservative English thought from 1780 to 1830	Also won in 1927 and 1930	
Humanities	English Literature	John Leslie Hotson	New York University	Systematic searches for new material for writing the lives of Elizabethan poets and dramatists	Also won in 1930	
Humanities	English Literature	Fannie Elizabeth Ratchford	University of Texas, Austin	Unpublished juvenile manuscripts of Charlotte Bronte	Also won in 1937 and 1957	
Humanities	English Literature	Alwin Thaler	University of Tennessee	Preparation of a book on the Strolling players		
Humanities	English Literature	Lois Whitney	Vassar College	Interrelations of the partly conflicting, partly converging ideas of progress and primitivism, especially as they are illustrated by English literature of the 18th century		
Humanities	English Literature	Edwin Eliott Willoughby	Newberry Library	Typographical problems in the First Folio of Shakespeare based upon a comparative analysis of the books issued from the Jaggard press		
Humanities	English Literature	Louis Booker Wright	University of North Carolina	Reflection of contemporary ideas in English drama before 1642	Also won in 1928	
Humanities	French Literature	George Remington Havens	Ohio State University	Catalogue of Voltaire's library		
Humanities	French Literature	Raphael Levy	University of Wisconsin	Copy and publication of material of value for Old French lexicography contained in seven unpublished French manuscripts written in Hebrew		
Humanities	General Nonfiction	Felix M. Morley	The Baltimore Sun	League of Nations	Also won in 1928	
Humanities	German and Eastern European History	Lawrence D. Steefel	University of Minnesota	First year of Otto von Bismarck's ministry in its international setting		
Humanities	German and Scandinavian Literature	Arthur Gilchrist Brodeur	University of California	History of Germanic heroic poetry; origins and developments of the heroic lay, its local variations in England, in Scandinavia, and on the continent, and the determination of its relations to political and social conditions, to religion and to folklore		
Humanities	German and Scandinavian Literature	Margaret Schlauch	New York University	Icelandic sagas		
Humanities	German and Scandinavian Literature	Harry Slochower	City College of New York	Infiltration of Schopenhauer's pessimism into German literature		
Humanities	Literary Criticism	John Van Horne	University of Illinois	Relations between the Italian and Spanish art epics of the Renaissance	Also won in 1931	
Humanities	Medieval History	Harold Lamb		Causes and aftermath of the First Crusade in Syria		
Humanities	Medieval History	Henry S. Lucas	University of Washington	Political, social, economic, and cultural history of the Low Countries, especially Flanders, from about 1280 to 1360		
Humanities	Medieval History	Sidney Raymond Packard	Smith College	Work on a volume of Norman Institutions in Transition, 1189-1226		
Humanities	Medieval Literature	Blanche Beatrice Boyer	Mt. Holyoke College	Latin manuscripts written in minuscule of the Irish and Anglo-Saxon script	Also won in 1930	
Humanities	Medieval Literature	Jacob Hammer	Hunter College	Manuscript of Geoffrey of Monmouth's history of the British kings	Also won in 1931 and 1938	
Humanities	Medieval Literature	Leslie W. Jones	Oberlin College	Certain manuscripts belonging to the School of Tours and to related schools to establish criteria for identifying and dating manuscripts written at Tours and to trace their influence upon the work of other scriptoria	Also won in 1931	
Humanities	Medieval Literature	Roland Mitchell Smith	Wesleyan University	Historical and legal literature of ancient Ireland, with special reference to Celtic parallels in the Welsh laws and historical works and the relationships and intercourse of the early Irish and Welsh and Northumbrian peoples of the Island of Britain	Also won in 1928	
Humanities	Philosophy	Brand Blanshard	Swarthmore College	Completion of his book The Place of Intelligence in Human Nature		
Humanities	Philosophy	William Ray Dennes	University of California	An aspect of Aristotle's doctrine of substance and of the status of the concept in recent metaphysics and philosophy of nature		
Humanities	Philosophy	Sidney Hook	New York University	New point of view of the post-Hegelian philosophy in Germany (1831–1850); an interpretation of the break-up of the Hegelian school in terms of the political, social and cultural movements current during the time; and preparation of a philosophic history of the period from Hegel to Marx, with emphasis on the social and political forces which controlled the evolution of ideas	Also won in 1928 and 1953	
Humanities	Philosophy	Gail Kennedy	Amherst College	Origin and development of pragmatic philosophies		
Humanities	Religion	Robert Pierce Casey	University of Cincinnati	Early Christian history, specifically studies of Ethenasius	Also won in 1928	
Humanities	Religion	Silva Tipple New		Textual criticism of the New Testament and the discrimination of the textual families in Greek, Syriac and Armenian manuscripts of the New Testament	Also won in 1930	
Humanities	Spanish and Portuguese Literature	Frederick Courtney Tarr	Princeton University	Origin and development of the Articulos de costumbre	Also won in 1930	
Humanities	Theatre Arts	Remo Bufano	Marionette Theatre	Volume on marionettes		
Humanities	Theatre Arts	James Light	Provincetown Players	New tendencies in the production and staging of plays		
Humanities	United States History	Merle Eugene Curti	Smith College	Interrelations between America and European pacifism during the period from 1860 to 1914		
Humanities	United States History	James Emmanuel Ernst	University of Illinois Urbana-Champaign	Life of Roger Williams and a study of the English background of his New England contemporaries		
Humanities	United States History	Alfred Barnaby Thomas	University of Oklahoma	Study of the development of the frontiers of New Mexico under the rule of Teodoro de Croix		
Humanities	United States History	Arthur P. Whitaker	Western Reserve University	Relations between Spain and the United States in the Old Southwest, 1795-1821; preparation of a book of documents on the commerce of the Floridas and Louisiana under Spain, 1779-1821	Also won in 1949	
Natural Sciences	Astronomy and Astrophysics	Dinsmore Alter	University of Kansas	Long-range weather prediction; application of statistical methods to meteorological and astronomical problems, with reference to the rainfall of the British Isles		
Natural Sciences	Astronomy and Astrophysics	Willem Jacob Luyten	Harvard University	Photographs of the Southern Sky with the Bruce Telescope at the Harvard Observatory in Maselspoort, South Africa and comparison of these plates with similar plates taken between 1896 and 1905 to obtain information concerning the number, velocities and intrinsic brightness of the stars in the neighborhood of the Sun	Also won in 1928 and 1937	
Natural Sciences	Chemistry	Wendell Mitchell Latimer	University of California	Thermodynamic treatment of solutions, with a view to extending his work on the entropy of aqueous ions		
Natural Sciences	Chemistry	Edward Mack, Jr.	Ohio State University	Theoretical study of the structure and stability of simple organic molecules		
Natural Sciences	Chemistry	Melvin Lorrel Nichols	Cornell University	Anionic phenomena		
Natural Sciences	Chemistry	Axel Ragnar Olson	University of California	Material effects of high frequency electrical fields		
Natural Sciences	Earth Science	Nelson Woodsworth Taylor	University of Minnesota	Factors governing deposition of ore minerals from hot aqueous solutions at high pressures		
Natural Sciences	Mathematics	Olive C. Hazlett	University of Illinois	Arithmetics of linear associative algebras together with their application and interpretation in other lines of mathematics, especially the theory of numbers	Also won in 1928	
Natural Sciences	Mathematics	Charles Hugh Smiley	University of Illinois	Methods of determining orbits of comets and asteroids		
Natural Sciences	Mathematics	Gordon Thomas Whyburn	University of Texas, Austin	Set point theory, with particular emphasis on the structure of continua and of continuous curves		
Natural Sciences	Medicine and Health	Warren Kidwell Stratman-Thomas	University of Wisconsin	Clinical trials of the therapeutic value of six new arsenical compounds in the chemotherapy of animal and human trypanosomiases	Also won in 1928	
Natural Sciences	Molecular & Cellular Biology	David Morris Greenberg	University of California	Certain electrochemical properties of hemoglobin		
Natural Sciences	Organismic Biology & Ecology	Samuel Brody	University of Missouri	Growth evolution of domestic animals	Also won in 1931	
Natural Sciences	Organismic Biology & Ecology	Eugene M. Landis	Hospital of the University of Pennsylvania	Reactions affecting the minute blood vessels of mammals	Also won in 1930	
Natural Sciences	Physics	Ora Stanley Duffendack	University of Michigan	Molecular phenomena and the excited state of molecules and atoms		
Natural Sciences	Physics	Roy J. Kennedy	California Institute of Technology	Theory of radiation in physics	Also won in 1928	
Natural Sciences	Physics	Robert Sanderson Mulliken	University of Chicago	Problems connected with the subject of the formation and dissociation of molecules and the assignment of quantum numbers for electrons in molecules	Also won in 1932	
Natural Sciences	Physics	John Clarke Slater	Harvard University	Quantum mechanics		
Natural Sciences	Physics	Louis Alexander Turner	Princeton University	Dissociation of molecules by light and by electron impact		
Natural Sciences	Physics	John Hasbrouck Van Vleck	University of Wisconsin	Quantum mechanics		
Natural Sciences	Plant Sciences	Jonas J. Christensen	University of Minnesota	Genetics of the physiologic forms of certain pathogenic fungi to crop plants		
Natural Sciences	Plant Sciences	Carroll William Dodge	Harvard University	Completion of lichen flora in Costa Rica	Also won in 1930	
Social Sciences	Education	Thomas Woody	University of Pennsylvania	Political education of citizens of the Soviet Republic and its bearings on the relation of Russia to her neighbors		
Social Sciences	Economics	Lionel Danforth Edie	University of Chicago	Policy of the Bank of France with special reference to its relation to the international banking situation	Also won in 1928	
Social Sciences	Political Science	Harold Scott Quigley	University of Minnesota	Government of Japan		

== See also ==
- Guggenheim Fellowship
- List of Guggenheim Fellowships awarded in 1928
- List of Guggenheim Fellowships awarded in 1930
