= List of Guggenheim Fellowships awarded in 1927 =

Sixty-three John Simon Guggenheim Fellowships were awarded in 1927 to representatives of 22 states. $143,000 was disbursed.

== 1927 U.S. and Canadian Fellows ==
Category	Field of Study	Fellow	Institutional association	Research topic	Notes	Ref
Creative Arts	Fiction	Walter White	National Association for the Advancement of Colored People	Lynching in the United States		
Creative Arts	Fine Arts	John Wesley Carroll	Art Students League of New York	Painting		
Creative Arts	Fine Arts	Samuel Vance Chamberlain	University of Michigan	Etching and drypoint		
Creative Arts	Fine Arts	Avard Fairbanks	University of Oregon	Sculpture		
Creative Arts	Fine Arts	Glen Amos Mitchell		Painting	Also won in 1926	
Creative Arts	Fine Arts	Isamu Noguchi		Sculpture	Also won in 1928	
Creative Arts	Fine Arts	Dorothy Ochtman		Painting		
Creative Arts	Fine Arts Research	Ernest Theodore DeWald	Princeton University	Publication of manuscripts of Stuttgart Psalter and a catalogue of the illuminated manuscripts at the library in Einsiedeln, Switzerland	Also won in 1931	
Creative Arts	General Nonfiction	Nathaniel Peffer	New School for Social Research	Effects of industrialism and nationalist on the Far East	Also won in 1928	
Creative Arts	Music Composition	Roy Harris		Composition	Also won in 1928, 1976	
Creative Arts	Music Composition	Carl McKinley	Capital Theatre	Composition	Also won in 1928	
Creative Arts	Music Composition	Bernard Rogers		Composition	Also won in 1928	
Creative Arts	Music Composition	Roger Sessions		Composition	Also won in 1926	
Creative Arts	Music Composition	Theodore J. Stearns		Composition		
Creative Arts	Poetry	Stephen Vincent Benét		Long narrative poem about the American Civil War	Also won in 1926	
Humanities	Architecture, Planning and Design	Myron Bement Smith		Italian brickwork of the Lombard period	Also won in 1928	
Humanities	British History	Frederick Charles Dietz	University of Illinois, Urbana	English government finance from 1558 to 1640		
Humanities	British History	Judith Blow Williams	Wellesley College	Efforts, both of individuals and through concerted private and governmental action, to open markets for the products of the Industrial Revolution in England	Also won in 1929	
Humanities	Classics	Marion Elizabeth Blake	Converse College	Republican and Augustan pavements of Italy	Also won in 1929, 1953	
Humanities	Classics	William Jerome Wilson	State Normal School at Cheney	The Shepherd of Hermas		
Humanities	English Literature	Ford Keeler Brown	St. John's College, Annapolis	Hannah More	Also won in 1929, 1930	
Humanities	English Literature	John William Draper	University of Maine	Bibliography of 18th century works on aesthetics and for origins of the "Graveyard School" of 18th century poetry in Great Britain	Also won in 1928	
Humanities	English Literature	John Andrew Rice, Jr.	University of Nebraska	Authorship of A Tale of a Tub		
Humanities	English Literature	Arthur Wellesley Secord	University of Illinois	Daniel Defoe		
Humanities	English Literature	Harold William Thompson	New York State College for Teachers	Biography	Also won in 1925	
Humanities	French History	E. Malcolm Carroll	Duke University	Influence of public opinion upon the foreign policy of the Third French Republic	Also won in 1928	
Humanities	French History	Raphael Demos	Harvard University	Philosophy of evolution and social philosophy in France		
Humanities	French Literature	Fred G. Hoffherr	Columbia University	Preparation for the publication of the manuscript Victor Hugo's Journal d'Exil		
Humanities	German and East European History	Frank Dunstone Graham	Princeton University	Commercial and industrial consequences of the rapid depreciation of the German and Polish monetary units of the post-war period		
Humanities	German and Scandinavian Literature	Archer Taylor	University of Chicago	Methods used in folklore study for tracing the history of the popular ballad	Also won in 1960	
Humanities	Iberian and Latin American History	J. Fred Rippy	Duke University	Latin America in world affairs		
Humanities	Intellectual and Cultural History	Bernadotte Everly Schmitt	University of Chicago	Origins and responsibility for the World War		
Humanities	Literary Criticism	Odell Shepard	Trinity College	Preparation of a book Romantic Solitude and for research in the history of the romantic movement		
Humanities	Music Research	Nicholas G.J. Ballanta		Musical conceptions of African peoples and comparison to older musical systems of Europe	Also won in 1928	
Humanities	Near Eastern Studies	Ephraim Avigdor Speiser	University of Pennsylvania		Also won in 1926	
Humanities	South Asian Studies	Helen Moore Johnson		Translation and commentary of Hemacandra's Loves of Sixty-three Famous Men		
Humanities	United States History	Frank Lawrence Owsley	Vanderbilt University	Certain phases of the relations of Europe and the Confederacy		
Humanities	United States History	Richard Joseph Purcell	Catholic University of America	Irish immigration to the United States from 1790 to the time of the American Civil War		
Humanities	United States History	George Malcolm Stephenson	University of Minnesota	History of Swedish immigration to the United States		
Natural Sciences	Chemistry	Wallace R. Brode	Bureau of Standards	Absorption spectra of aniline dyes	Also won in 1926	
Natural Sciences	Chemistry	George Ernest Gibson	University of California, Berkeley	Theory of band spectra		
Natural Sciences	Chemistry	Linus Pauling	California Institute of Technology		Also won in 1926, 1965	
Natural Sciences	Chemistry	Lloyd Hilton Reyerson	University of Minnesota	Contact catalysis	Also won in 1957	
Natural Sciences	Mathematics	Philip Franklin	Massachusetts Institute of Technology	Integral equations, orthogonal functions, and their relation to almost periodic functions		
Natural Sciences	Mathematics	Harry Shultz Vandiver	University of Texas, Austin	Fermat's Last Theorem and the laws of reciprocity in the theory of algebraic numbers	Also won in 1930	
Natural Sciences	Medicine and Health	William Ruthrauff Amberson	University of Pennsylvania	Mechanisms involved in the electrical stimulation of nerve and music		
Natural Sciences	Molecular and Cellular Biology	Edward Frederick Adolph	University of Rochester	Internal factors that control the size of organisms, particularly during growth		
Natural Sciences	Organismic Biology & Ecology	Ralph Erskine Cleland	Goucher College	Chromosome constitution and behavior of the evening primrose, as related to certain genetical problems	Also won in 1928	
Natural Sciences	Organismic Biology & Ecology	Lewis Victor Heilbrunn	University of Michigan	Colloid chemistry of protoplasm		
Natural Sciences	Organismic Biology & Ecology	Edwin Blake Payson	University of Wyoming	Taxonomy in relation to generic phylogenies		
Natural Sciences	Physics	Carl Eckart	California Institute of Technology	New quantum theory		
Natural Sciences	Physics	William Vermillion Houston	California Institute of Technology	Recent developments in quantum mechanics as applied to the explanation of spectra		
Natural Sciences	Physics	Frank C. Hoyt	University of Chicago	Quantum theory and its meaning for radiation and atomic structure		
Natural Sciences	Physics	Victor F. Lenzen	University of California, Berkeley	Statistical mechanics		
Natural Sciences	Physics	Manuel Sandoval Vallarta	Massachusetts Institute of Technology	Connection between Schrödinger's wave mechanics and Einstein's theory of relativity		
Natural Sciences	Physics	Jay Walter Woodrow	Iowa State College	Phosphorescent, chemiluminescencent and photoelectric properties of cod liver oil and other substances which either have anti-rachitic characteristics or can be activated by treatment with ultra-violet light		
Natural Sciences	Plant Sciences	Richard Bradfield	University of Missouri	Principles involved in the purification of colloids by electrodialysis	Also won in 1928	
Natural Sciences	Plant Sciences	William Henry Eyster	University of Maine	Physiology of the chloroplastid pigments		
Natural Sciences	Plant Sciences	Rodney Beecher Harvey	University of Minnesota	Low temperature effects on plants	Also won in 1928	
Social Sciences	Anthropology and Cultural Studies	James Penrose Harland	University of Cincinnati	Civilizations of the Bronze Age in and around Greece	Also won in 1927	
Social Sciences	Economics	Mollie Ray Carroll	Goucher College	Present-day system of unemployment insurance in Germany		
Social Sciences	Political Science	Roger Hewes Wells	Bryn Mawr College	Preparation of the book Municipal Government in the German Commonwealth		
Social Sciences	Political Science	Leonard Dupee White	University of Chicago	Trade unions and professional organizations in the public service of Great Britain	Also won in 1928	

== See also ==
- Guggenheim Fellowship
- List of Guggenheim Fellowships awarded in 1926
- List of Guggenheim Fellowships awarded in 1928
