= List of Guggenheim Fellowships awarded in 1926 =

Thirty-seven scholars, scientists, and artists across 18 states were awarded Guggenheim Fellowships in 1926. $100,000 was disbursed among them.

== 1928 fellows ==
Category	Field of Study	Fellow	Institutional association	Research topic	Notes	Ref
Creative Arts	Fine Arts	Glen Amos Mitchell		Painting: religious and historical in character abroad	Also won in 1927	
Creative Arts	Fine Arts	Elizabeth Olds		Painting: portraiture		
Creative Arts	Fine Arts	Frank H. Schwarz		Painting: mural decoration in Europe		
Creative Arts	Musical Composition	Leopold Mannes		Composing		
Creative Arts	Musical Composition	Roger Sessions	Cleveland Institute of Music	Composing	Also won in 1927	
Creative Arts	Poetry	Stephen Vincent Benét		Poetry and prose	Also won in 1927	
Humanities	Architecture, Planning and Design	Kenneth John Conant	Harvard University	Authoritative set of drawings, being restorations of three Romanesque French churches	Also won in 1928, 1929, 1930, and 1954	
Humanities	Biography	John Donald Wade	University of Georgia	Early history of Georgia and Alabama		
Humanities	British History	Paul Knaplund	University of Wisconsin	Monograph preparation on William Ewart Gladstone as a colonial statesman		
Humanities	English Literature	Thomas Middleton Raysor	State College of Washington	New edition of Coleridge's literary criticism	Also won in 1928	
Humanities	English Literature	Hyder Edward Rollins	New York University	Studying and editing unpublished ballads of the Pepysian collection		
Humanities	English Literature	Robert Schafer	University of Cincinnati	New edition of the works of Fulke Greville		
Humanities	German and Scandinavian Literature	Walter Silz	Harvard University	Literature of Heinrich Von Kleist	Also won in 1960	
Humanities	Medieval History	Warren Ault	Boston University	English local government		
Humanities	Medieval History	David S. Blondheim	Johns Hopkins University	Use of romance languages by the Jews		
Humanities	Near Eastern Studies	Ephraim Avigdor Speiser	University of Pennsylvania	Mitanni group of peoples in Northern Mesopotamia	Also won in 1927	
Humanities	Philosophy	Ralph Monroe Eaton	Harvard University	Theory of knowledge in its relation to logic and metaphysics		
Humanities	Philosophy	Marjorie Hope Nicolson	Goucher College	English 17th-century thought		
Humanities	Theatre Arts	Hallie Flanagan	Vassar College	Developments of the theater in Europe		
Natural Sciences	Chemistry	Wallace R. Brode	Bureau of Standards	Azo dyes	Also won in 1927	
Natural Sciences	Chemistry	Linus Pauling	California Institute of Technology	Theoretical and experimental research into the atom	Also won in 1927 and 1965	
Natural Sciences	Mathematics	Ernest Preston Lane	University of Chicago	Comparative study of geometry		
Natural Sciences	Mathematics	Ellis Bagley Stouffer	University of Kansas	Comparative study of differential geometry		
Natural Sciences	Mathematics	Norbert Wiener	Massachusetts Institute of Technology	Bohr's almost periodic functions		
Natural Sciences	Medicine and Health	Julian Herman Lewis	University of Chicago	Fundamental nature of immunity phenomena		
Natural Sciences	Medicine and Health	Harold Myers Marvin	Yale Medical School	Cardiovascular physiology		
Natural Sciences	Organismic Biology and Ecology	Royal Norton Chapman	University of Minnesota	Destructive pests		
Natural Sciences	Organismic Biology and Ecology	Alfred E. Emerson	University of Pittsburgh	Origin of the caste of termites		
Natural Sciences	Organismic Biology and Ecology	Franklin Pearce Reagan	University of California and Indiana University	Earliest blood vessels of mammalian embryos		
Natural Sciences	Physics	Arthur Compton	University of Chicago	Nature of radiation		
Natural Sciences	Physics	Edwin C. Kemble	Harvard University	New quantum theory		
Natural Sciences	Physics	Ralph A. Sawyer	University of Michigan	Spectral series relations in extreme ultraviolet metallic spectra		
Social Sciences	Anthropology and Cultural Studies	James Penrose Harland	Harvard University	Ancient civilizations in Greece, Crete and Cyclades	Also won in 1927	
Social Sciences	Anthropology and Cultural Studies	Gladys Reichard	Columbia University	Art style of Melanesia		
Social Sciences	Economics	Alzada Comstock	Mount Holyoke College	League of Nations financial reconstruction work		
Social Sciences	Geography and Environmental Studies	Glenn Thomas Trewartha	University of Wisconsin	Geographic investigations of Japan and China	Also won in 1943	
Social Sciences	Political Science	Herbert Feis	University of Cincinnati	French-brand German pre-war foreign investments		
Social Sciences	Religion	Roland Bainton	Yale Divinity School	Preparation of a book on religious tolerance		

== 1926 renewals ==
Category	Field of Study	Fellow	Institutional association	Research topic	Notes	Ref
Creative Arts	Musical Composition	Aaron Copland		Composing	Also won in 1925	
Humanities	British History	Violet Barbour	Vassar College	Sir George Downing	Also won in 1925	
Humanities	Classics	Allen Brown West	Princeton University	Athenian empire	Also won in 1925	
Humanities	General Nonfiction	Isaac Fisher		Danger trends in world race relations	Also won in 1925	
Humanities	Religion	Kenneth James Saunders	Pacific School of Religion	Oriental religions	Also won in 1925	

== See also ==
- Guggenheim Fellowship
- List of Guggenheim Fellowships awarded in 1925
- List of Guggenheim Fellowships awarded in 1927
