= List of Guggenheim Fellowships awarded in 1925 =

Fifteen American scholars and artists, including one woman and one Black man, were awarded Guggenheim Fellowships in 1925. This was the inaugural year of this award and was given by the John Simon Guggenheim Memorial Foundation. Composer Aaron Copland was the only recipient not to have a college degree.

== Fellows ==
Category	Field of Study	Fellow	Institutional association	Research topic	Notes	Ref
Creative Arts	Musical Composition	Aaron Copland		Composing	Also won in 1926	
Humanities	British History	Violet Barbour	Vassar College	Period of the Protectorate and the Restoration	Also won in 1926	
Humanities	Classics	Allen Brown West	University of Pennsylvania	Tribute Records of the ancient Athenian Empire	Also won in 1926	
Humanities	English Literature	Harold William Thompson	New York State College for Teachers	Biography	Also won in 1927	
Humanities	General Nonfiction	Isaac Fisher	Fisk University	Interracial relations in the United States and abroad	Also won in 1926	
Humanities	Medieval Literature	Clark Harris Slover	University of Chicago	History of literature	Also won in 1931	
Humanities	Renaissance History	Merritt Y. Hughes	University of California	Literature of the Italian Renaissance and its effect on English literature of the 16th century		
Natural Science	Chemistry	Gerhard Krohn Rollefson	University of California	Physical chemistry		
Natural Science	Mathematics	John Robert Kline	University of Pennsylvania	Analysis situs of three dimensions from a point set standpoint		
Natural Science	Medicine and Health	Edwin William Schultz	Leland Stanford Junior University	Processes by which bacteria are destroyed by various agencies		
Natural Science	Neuroscience	Percival Bailey	Peter Bent Brigham Hospital, Harvard Medical School	Diseases of the nervous system		
Natural Science	Plant Sciences	Gordon Floyd Ferris	Leland Stanford Junior University	Scientific trip to Mexico, Central, and South America		
Social Sciences	Political Science	Quincy Wright	University of Chicago	International law		
Social Sciences	Psychology	Coleman Griffith	University of Illinois	Child psychology		
Social Sciences	Religion	Kenneth James Saunders	Pacific School of Religion	Oriental religions	Also won in 1926	

== See also ==
- Guggenheim Fellowship
- List of Guggenheim Fellowships awarded in 1926
