= Bradfield Hall =

Building at Cornell University in Ithaca, New York

Coordinates: 42°26′51.35″N 76°28′48.40″W

Cornell University Bradfield Hall
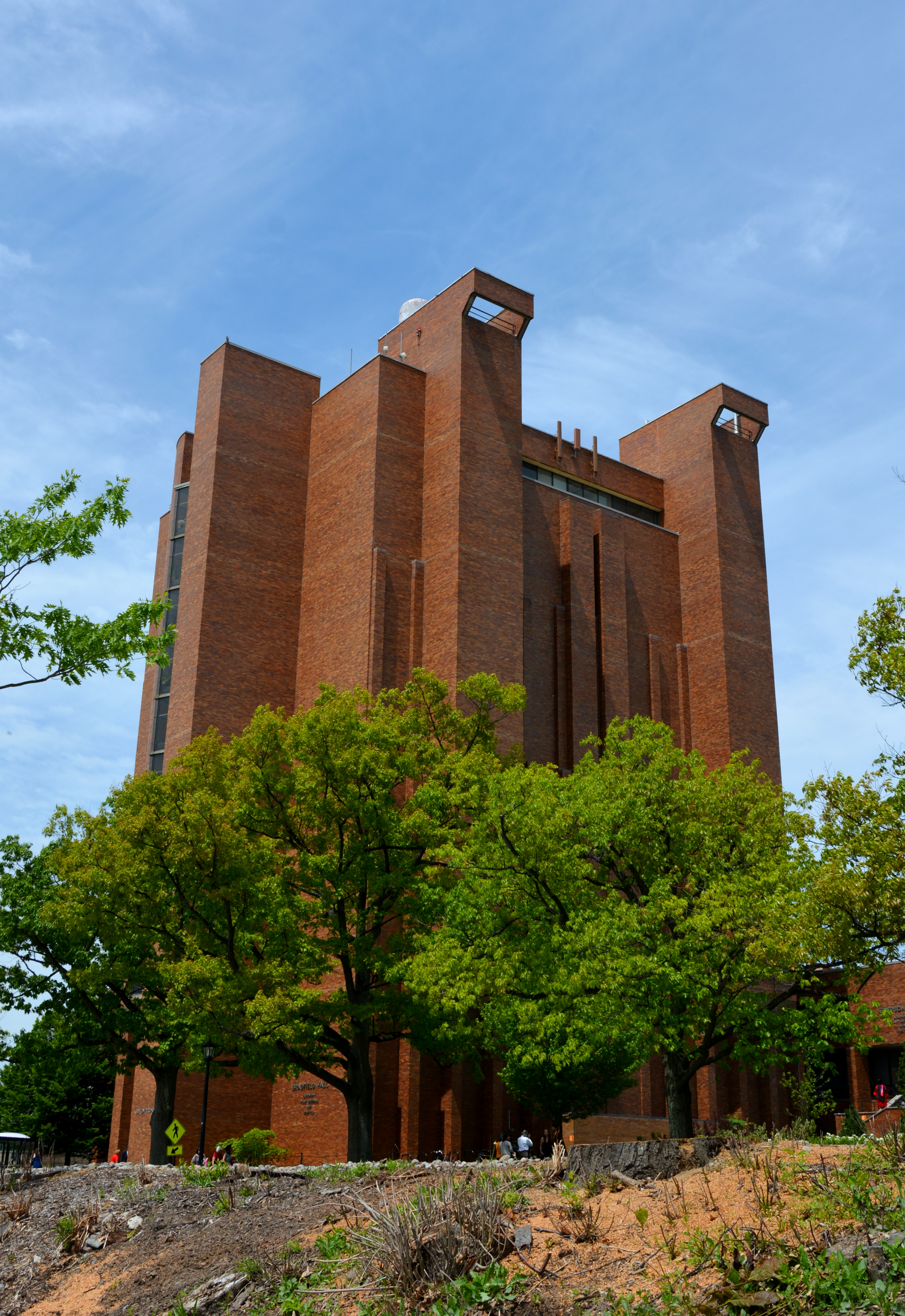

General information
- Type: Academic building
- Architectural style: Brutalist
- Location: Ithaca, New York, US, 306 Tower Road
- Opened: 1969
- Cost: $6.2 Million

Height
- Height: 166 ft (51 m)

Technical details
- Floor count: 11

Design and construction
- Architect: Ulrich Franzen

Website
- https://ccams.eas.cornell.edu/index.php?page=exp_bradfield

Bradfield Hall is an academic structure situated on central campus of Cornell University in Ithaca, New York. It is located on the eastern boundary of the Agricultural Quadrangle on Tower Road. It was named in honor of Cornell agronomy professor Richard Bradfield.

== Description ==
Designed in the brutalist style by Ulrich Franzen, the building was completed in 1969. Bradfield currently houses Cornell's departments of Crop and Soil Science, Earth and Atmospheric Sciences, Plant Breeding and Genetics. As most of the laboratories in the building are climate controlled, none of the rooms in the first ten stories in Bradfield have windows (the hallways have windows at each end).

The eleventh floor contains the Northeast Regional Climate Center, one of the six National Oceanic and Atmospheric Administration regional climate centers. Also located in the building are a computer lab and a library. Bradfield Hall was named after Professor Richard Bradfield, a noted crop and soil scientist and Guggenheim Fellowship winner.

Bradfield Hall's accolades include being listed by the building data site Emporis, as one of the "World's 10 most spectacular university buildings"

According to reports, Bradfield is among the campus's "most-intensive" buildings.
