= Ralph Monroe Eaton =

American philosopher

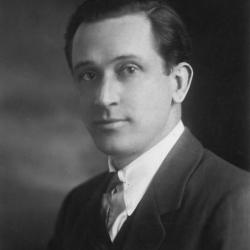

Ralph Monroe Eaton (June 28, 1892 – April 13, 1932) was an American philosopher of Harvard University whose career was cut short at the age of 39. He specialized in the theory of knowledge and logic but later became interested in psychoanalysis. He served in the United States Army during the First World War and wrote an unpublished memoir of his experiences.

== Early life and marriage ==
Ralph Monroe Eaton was born on June 28, 1892, in Stockton, California. He was educated at the University of California, Berkeley (Lit. B.A, 1914) and Harvard University (M.A., 1915, Ph.D., April 28, 1917). He married Hortense Bissell in 1922, and had a daughter Virginia Eaton Blair, on September 17, 1923. The marriage was not successful and ended in separation. At age 14, Ralph authored a first-hand account of the San Francisco Earthquake of 1906.

== World War I ==
In the late spring of 1917, Eaton volunteered for [perhaps after a draft notice], and was accepted to the U.S. Army Officers' Training Corps. He trained in Plattsburgh, New York in the summer of 1917. Upon completion of basic training, he was commissioned a Second Lieutenant. In the fall of 1917, he shipped out to France via Halifax, Nova Scotia, with the 26th "Yankee" Division, 103rd Infantry Regiment. His description of heading out of Halifax follows:

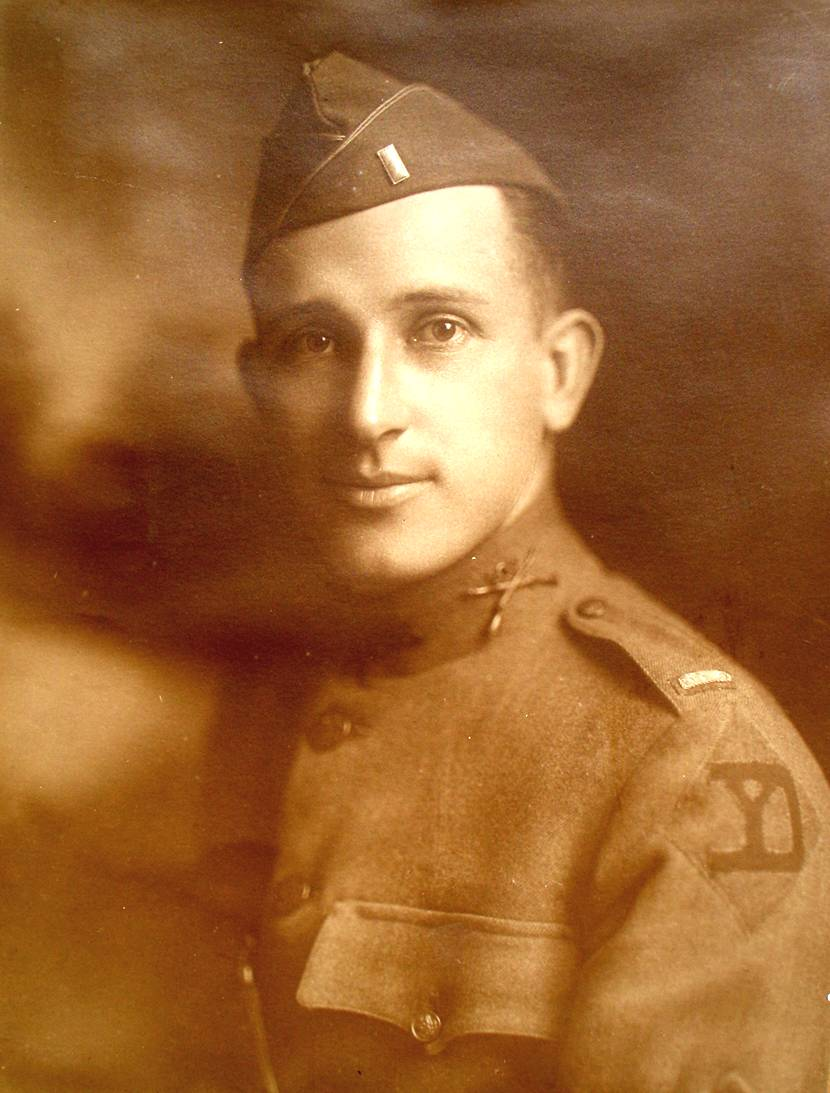
Lieutenant Ralph M. Eaton

"I am setting off for the war. A line of ships, grey with wide zigzag stripes painted in black and white across their hulls, decks, and funnels; moves in the sunshine of a September afternoon, down the harbor at Halifax. Three British warships flank the channel on either side. On their desks the sailors stand at attention as our ships, British ships bearing green Americans to France, pass out to sea. Bands are playing, flags flying, and under my lieutenant’s uniform little pimples of gooseflesh stand out all over my skin."

He initially served as a supply officer with the 26th Division, and but later transferred to the infantry. He was given a battlefield promotion to the rank of First Lieutenant on September 13, 1918. His division and regiment saw action at Chateau Thierry, at Belleau Woods, Saint-Mihiel, and in the Argonne.

After the war, he wrote an unpublished memoir of his experiences, "Backward glances of a demobilized soldier" - a small portion of which were published by the Washington Post, on Nov. 11, 2001.

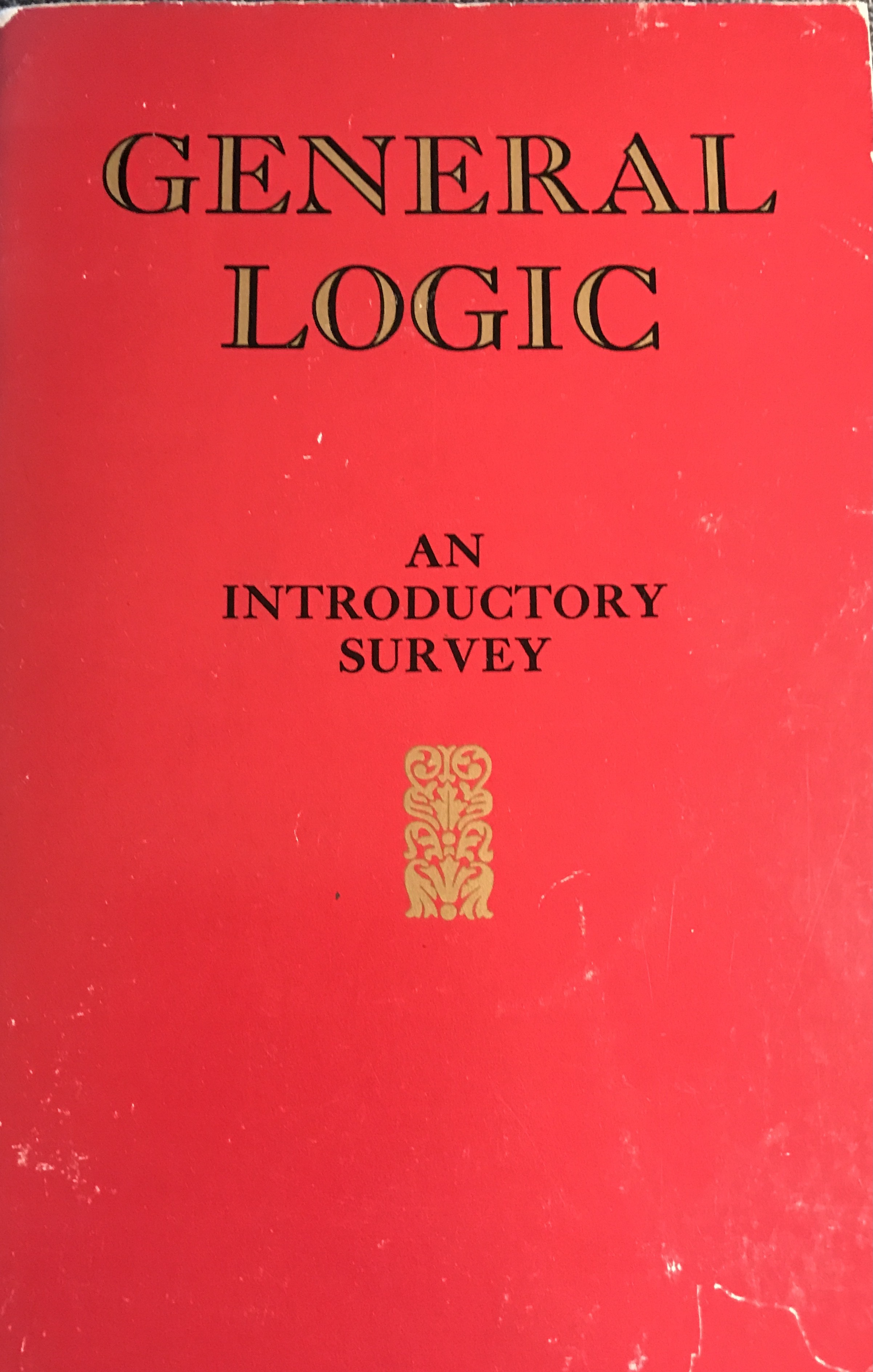
General Logic, 1931

== Academic career ==
Eaton obtained his undergraduate degree the University of California, Berkeley (Lit. B.A, 1914), and his first graduate degree at Harvard University (M.A., 1915). Eaton continued his studies as a Ph.D. candidate in philosophy at Harvard University from 1915 to 1917. He earned his Ph.D. April 28 of 1917. After enlisting in the Army and serving in France, he demobilized at Camp Devens, MA, in 1919. He returned to Harvard as an assistant professor in 1919 and later as an associate professor in February 1930. He stayed at the university until the end of his career. He was also briefly an assistant professor at Radcliffe College.

He was a Guggenheim Fellow in 1926, awarded for a study of the "philosophy, particularly the theory of knowledge in its relation to logic and metaphysics, with Professor E. Husserl and the phenomenological school of German philosophers, principally at the University of Freiburg, Germany; and for the writing in English of a critical account of the philosophy of this school". At Harvard, he worked with and was a good friend of professor Alfred North Whitehead.

Eaton's first interests were in the scientific method and logic and his first book, Symbolism and Truth (1925), was an epistemological study that used logic to explore philosophy. It was compared to Wittgenstein's Tractatus in its preoccupations. In General Logic (1931), Eaton dealt with symbolic logic as well as the Aristotelian idea of logic and inductive logic. On the basis of the works, Harvard promoted Eaton to associate professor in February 1930. Soon afterwards he was found in his room drunk and depressed over the failure of his marriage. As a result, in March the university withdrew his promotion, declared him emotionally unstable, and put him on leave until the start of the 1931–32 academic year. In addition, his contract as an assistant professor was not renewed at the end of that academic year. He became interested in psychoanalysis and the break from his Harvard duties allowed him to translate and write a preface to Secret Ways of the Mind by Wolfgang Müller Kranefeldt, with an introduction by Carl Jung, which was published in early 1932. During this time he worked closely with Jung, spending time with him in Zurich, and allowing Jung to interpret his dreams. It is possible that Eaton may have suffered from Post Traumatic Stress Disorder (PTSD) after his experience in the trenches of World War I.

== Death ==
In April 1932, Eaton dismissed a class at Radcliffe due to dizziness. At the insistence of friends, he checked into a hospital for a night, but departed the next morning. A group of colleagues found his body in a forest in West Concord, where he had taken his life.

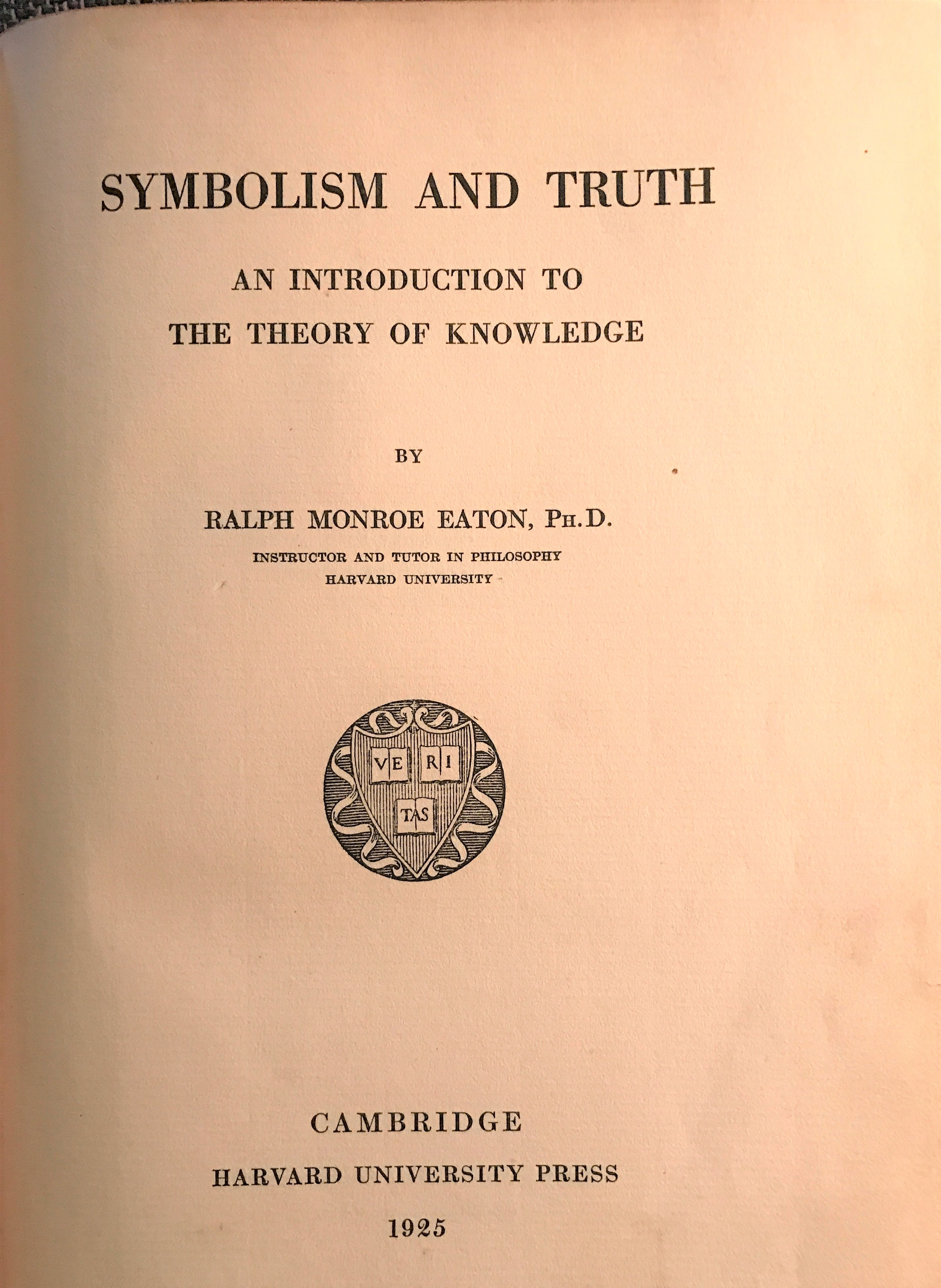
Symbolism and Truth, 1923

== Selected publications ==
- Symbolism and truth: An introduction to the theory of knowledge. Harvard University Press, Cambridge, MA, 1925.
- Selections from Descartes. Scribner's, 1927. (editor) (The Modern Student's Library)
- General logic: An Introductory Survey. Scribner's, 1931.

"The Social Unrest of the Soldier," Author(s): Ralph M. Eaton. Reviewed work(s):Source: International Journal of Ethics, Vol. 31, No. 3 (Apr., 1921), pp. 279–288Published by: The University of Chicago PressStable URL: http://www.jstor.org/stable/2377581

"Eaton on the Problem of Negation," Jonathan D, Moreno, George Washington University, Ebsco Publishing, 2003.

"Social Fatalism," Author(s): Ralph M. Eaton. Source: The Philosophical Review, Vol. 30, No. 4 (Jul., 1921), pp. 380–392 Duke University Press, Stable URL: http://www.jstor.org/stable/2179048

"The Logic of Probable Propositions,"Author(s): Ralph M. Eaton. Source: The Journal of Philosophy, Psychology and Scientific Methods, Vol. 17, No. 2 (Jan.15, 1920), pp. 44-51Published by: Journal of Philosophy, Inc.Stable URL: http://www.jstor.org/stable/2939997

"The Meaning of Chance," Author(s): Ralph M. Eaton. Source: The Monist, Vol. 31, No. 2 (APRIL, 1921), pp. 280–296Published by: Hegeler InstituteStable URL: http://www.jstor.org/stable/27900856 .

"The Value of Theories,"Author(s): Ralph M. Eaton. Source: The Journal of Philosophy, Vol. 18, No. 25 (Dec. 8, 1921), pp. 682-690Published by: Journal of Philosophy, Inc.Stable URL: http://www.jstor.org/stable/2939740 .

"What is the Problem of Knowledge?" Author(s): Ralph M. Eaton. Source: The Journal of Philosophy, Vol. 20, No. 7 (Mar. 29, 1923), pp. 178–187Published by: Journal of Philosophy, Inc.Stable URL: http://www.jstor.org/stable/2939834

== See also ==
- Raphael Demos
- Alfred North Whitehead

"The Motives of the Soldier," Author(s): T. H. Procter. Reviewed work(s):Source: International Journal of Ethics, Vol. 31, No. 1 (Oct., 1920), pp. 26–50Published by: The University of Chicago Press Stable URL: http://www.jstor.org/stable/2377162
