= Glenn Thomas Trewartha =

American geographer (1896–1984)

Glenn Thomas Trewartha (1896 – 1984) was an American geographer and climatologist of Cornish American descent. He is best known for his eponymous Trewartha climate classification, an expanded and modified version of the Köppen–Geiger system.

He graduated from the University of Wisconsin–Madison, with a Ph.D. in 1924. He taught at the University of Wisconsin.

He gave an address to the Association of American Geographers, "A Case for Population Geography", in which he argued that "fundamentally geography is anthropocentric, and if such is the case, that numbers, densities and qualities of the population provide the essential background for all geography. Population provide the essential background for all geography. Population is the point of reference from which all other elements are observed, and from which they all singly and collectively derive significance and meaning". He also wrote about climate, explaining that the atmosphere was like "a pane of glass in a greenhouse... thus maintaining surface temperatures considerably higher than they otherwise would be."

== Awards ==
- 1926 Guggenheim Fellowship

== Works ==
- "The earliest map of Galena, Illinois" Wisconsin Magazine Of History. Volume: 23 /Issue: 1 (1939–1940)
- A Reconnaissance geography of Japan, University of Wisconsin, 1934
- Elements of geography physical and cultural, Glenn Thomas Trewartha, Vernor Clifford Finch, Mc Graw-Hill, 1942
- Japan, a physical, cultural and regional geography, University of Wisconsin press, 1945
- An introduction to climate, McGraw-Hill, 1954
- Japan, a geography, Milwaukee: University of Wisconsin press, 1965
- An introduction to climate McGraw-Hill, 1968
- The More developed realm: a geography of its population, Editor Glenn Thomas Trewartha, Pergamon Press, 1978, ISBN 978-0-08-020631-8
- The Earth's problem climates, University of Wisconsin Press, 1981, ISBN 978-0-299-08230-7

== See also ==
- Trewartha climate classification
- Geography of Japan
