= Belle Baranceanu =

American painter

Belle Goldschlager Baranceanu
- Artist Belle Baranceanu standing with a painting of two monks c. 1934
- Born: Belle Goldschlager; July 17, 1902; Chicago, Illinois
- Died: January 17, 1988 (aged 85); La Jolla, California
- Known for: Painting, Murals

Belle Goldschlager Baranceanu (July 17, 1902 – January 17, 1988) was an American painter, teacher, muralist, lithographer, engraver and illustrator.

She was born Belle Goldschlager in Chicago, Illinois (Baranceanu was her mother's maiden name). Her parents, both Romanian Jewish immigrants, separated during Belle's early childhood, and she grew up on her maternal grandparents' farm in North Dakota.

== Biography ==
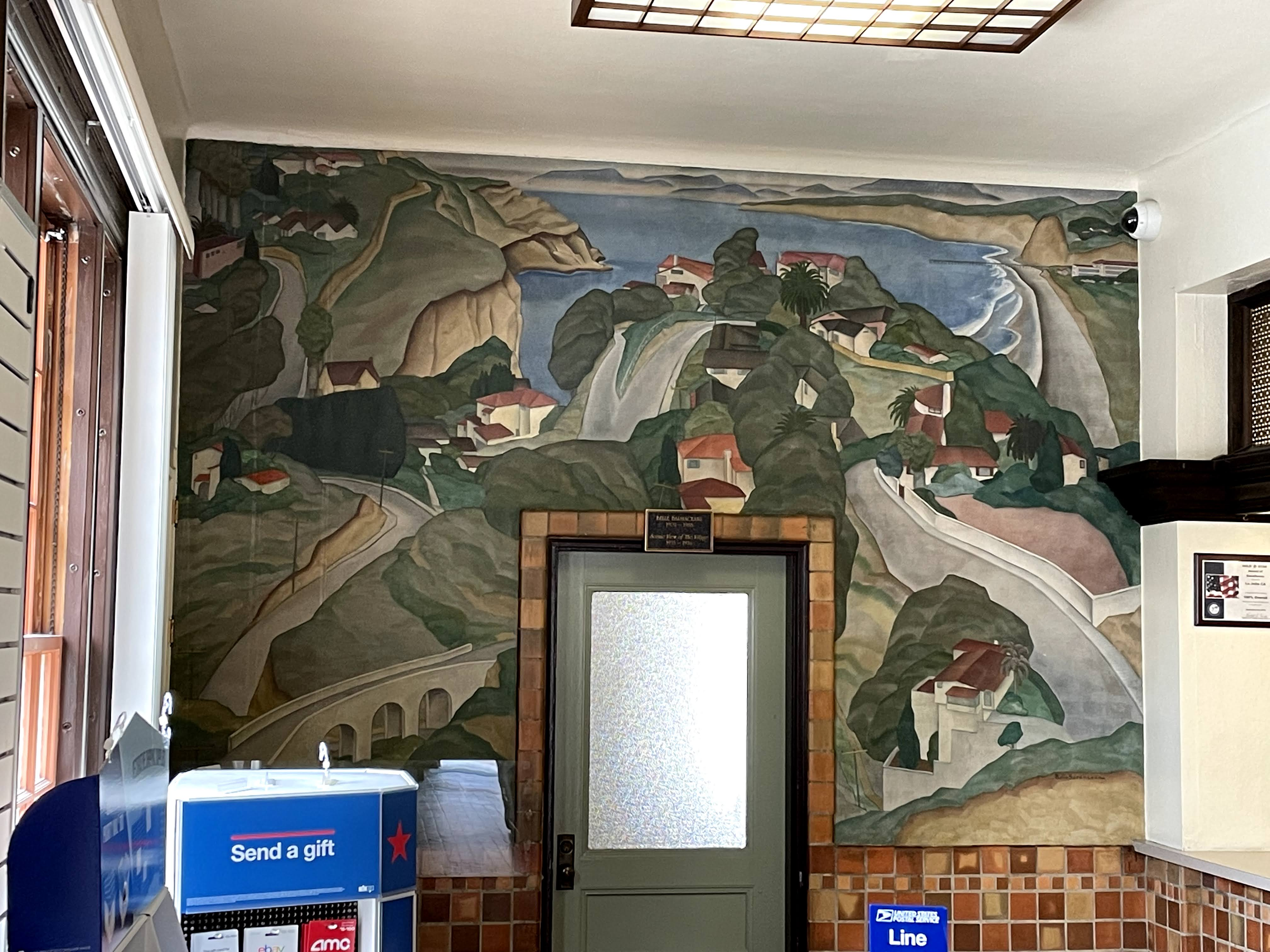
Scenic View of the Village, mural for the United States Post Office in La Jolla, California

She studied at the Minneapolis School of Fine Arts under Anthony Angarola, to whom she was engaged until his death in 1929. Active in Chicago during the 1920s as a teacher and exhibitor, she worked in Los Angeles, California in 1927–1928. She moved to San Diego in 1933.

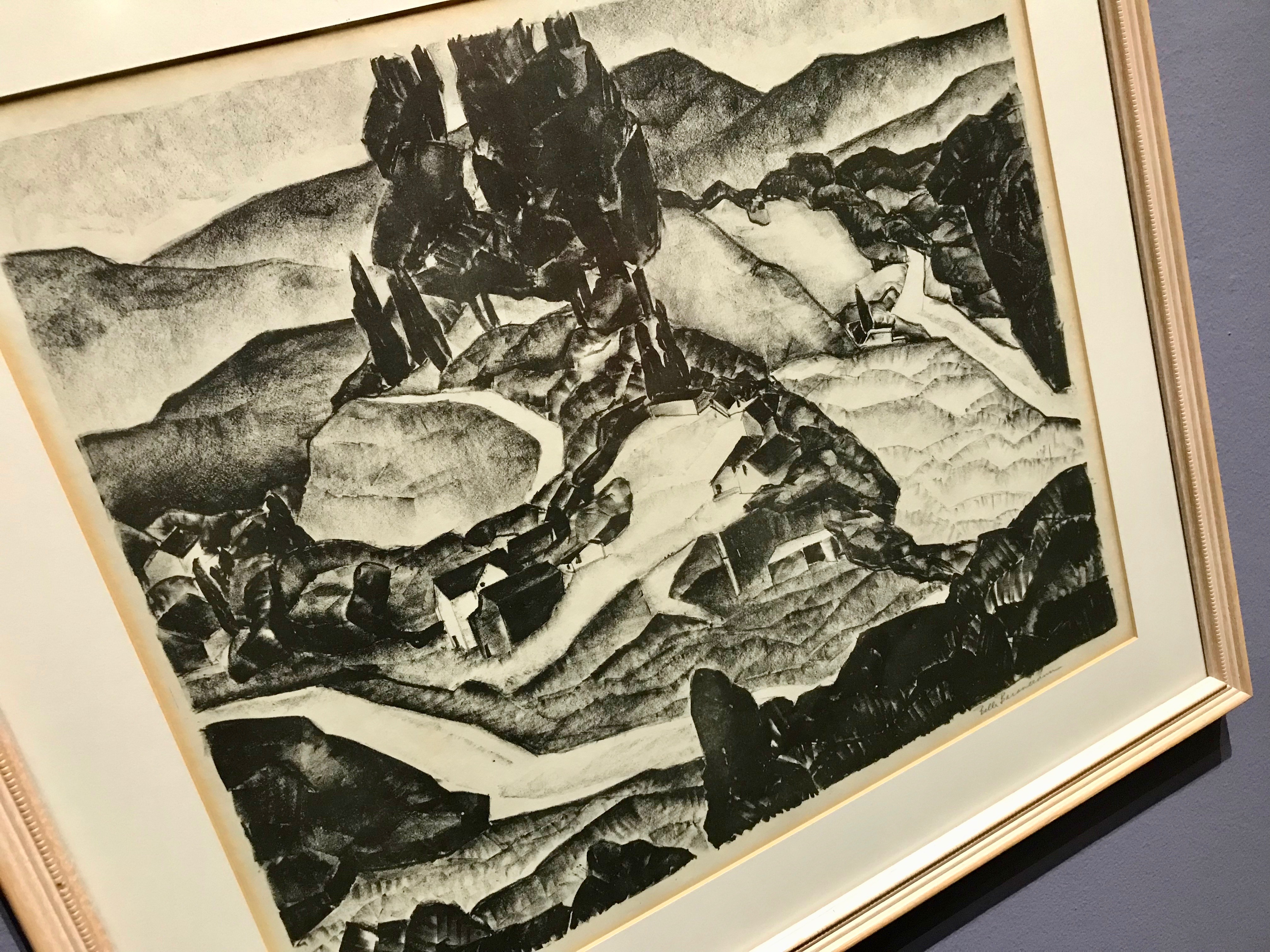
Elysian Park, 1928, by Belle Baranceanu.

She painted an oil-on canvas-mural in the La Jolla post office (Scenic View of the Village) in 1936 for the Section of Painting and Sculpture. As a muralist for the Works Progress Administration curriculum project, she painted murals for Roosevelt Junior High School (Building Padre Dam and Potola's Departure) in 1937–38. Between 1939 and 1940 she completed a WPA mural titled The Seven Arts in the La Jolla High School Auditorium.

Baranceanu was a member of the Chicago Society of Artists.

She exhibited her work at the Art Institute of Chicago, Carnegie Institute, Los Angeles County Museum of Art, Denver Art Museum, and others. Baranceanu taught at the La Jolla School of Arts & Crafts and Frances Parker School. She died in La Jolla on January 17, 1988.
