= Anthony Angarola =

American painter (1893–1929)

- Born: 4 February 1893
- Died: 15 August 1929 (aged 36)
- Education: School of the Art Institute of Chicago
- Known for: Painting, printmaking, and art instructor

Anthony Angarola (4 February 1893–15 August 1929) was an American painter, printmaker, and art instructor. He graduated from the School of the Art Institute of Chicago. Since he was an Italian immigrant himself, his work focused on people who struggled to adapt to a foreign culture.

== Work ==
Angarola taught as an art instructor at the Layton School of Art in Milwaukee in 1921, the Minneapolis School of Art from 1922 to 1925, the School of the Art Institute of Chicago in 1926 and the Kansas City Art Institute from 1926. He was awarded a Guggenheim Fellowship in 1928. He also participated in the Carnegie International exposition in 1928, exhibiting his painting entitled Proud.

== Personal life ==
Angarola was married to Maria Ambrosius, a concert pianist. They had two children, including character actor Richard Angarola. He has three grandchildren: Ondine Angarola, who is an aspiring screenwriter, Richard Angarola, and Anthony Angarola, and one great-granddaughter Aurélia Langford, who is an aspiring singer-songwriter

Angarola died after he was injured in an automobile accident in France. Although he died at the young age of 36, he inspired many artists. Two of his noted students were William S. Schwartz and Belle Baranceanu, with whom he was engaged at the time of his death. His work is now in the permanent collection of several museums including the Art Institute of Chicago, the Minneapolis Institute of Arts, and the Davis Museum at Wellesley College in Boston.

== H. P. Lovecraft ==
Angarola is also notable as one of the favorite artists of the horror writer H. P. Lovecraft. Lovecraft made a reference to the works of Angarola in his short story "The Call of Cthulhu" and did the same in "Pickman's Model":

Only a real artist knows the actual anatomy of the terrible or the physiology of fear―the exact sort of lines and proportions that connect up with latent instincts or hereditary memories of fright, and the proper colour contrasts and lighting effects to stir the dormant sense of strangeness.... There's something those fellows catch―beyond life―that they're able to make us catch for a second. Doré had it. Sime has it. Angarola of Chicago has it.
