= Nicholas G. J. Ballanta =

- Born: Nicholas George Julius Taylor; 14 March 1893; Kissy, Sierra Leone
- Died: 1962 (aged 68–69) Kissy, Sierra Leone
- Occupations: music scholar, composer, educator
- Years active: 1911–1962

Nicholas G.J. Ballanta (1893–1962) was a Sierra Leonean music scholar, composer, and educator who conducted field research on the music of West Africa in the early 20th century. His education in European music influenced his musical compositions. The years he spent collecting indigenous African music prompted him to compose musical plays or operas set in African villages; his work combines elements from both African and European music.

== Early life ==
Nicholas George Julius Taylor was born to Krio parents on 14 March 1893 in Kissy, near the city of Freetown in Sierra Leone. His mother was a Christian woman named Sarian Ade Wray, and his early memories included singing in the choir at St. Patrick's Anglican Church. His father, Gustavus Taylor, played the violin and organ. A ship's engineer, Gustavus Taylor travelled between Sierra Leone and the Gambia. Nicholas remembered his father performing concerts in the Gambia. Gustavus died in a shipping accident when Nicholas was ten years old.

In 1905, Nicholas was sent to the CMS Grammar School in Freetown. There, he played clarinet and became sergeant of the school band. By 1906, he completed Clark's Catechism in Music, and also won first prize in music at the government school exhibition. At that time, he began organ lessons. Completing the high school course in less than the normal three years, he went to work as a clerk in the Sierra Leone attorney general's office. He received several promotions for government positions in Sierra Leone and the Gambia.

Beginning in 1911, Nicholas served as organist at St. Patrick's church, and between 1913 and 1917, he studied books on harmony, form, counterpoint, and fugue. In 1917, he passed the first examination for the degree of Bachelor of Music at Durham University, but a trip to England would have been required to complete the degree.

As musical director of the choral society in Freetown, Nicholas worked with Adelaide Caseley Hayford, who used her influence to promote Ballanta's further education. He composed a choral work, "Belshazzar's Feast", set to a text by Felicia Hemans, that was performed in Freetown in 1919. When Mrs. Caseley Hayford travelled to America, she took that work with her to continue promoting his career. She urged him to join her and sent funds for his journey to the United States.

== Career ==
=== American period (1921–1924) ===
After working with Mrs. Caseley Hayford to produce African pageants in Boston and Philadelphia, Nicholas went to New York, where he wrote two articles for the Musical Courier: "Jazz Music and Its Relation to African Music" (1 June 1922), and "An African Scale" (29 June 1922).

At this time, Nicholas began to change his name from "Taylor", a name given to his grandfather by missionaries to "Ballanta". The first article published in Musical Courier uses "Nicholas G. Taylor". The second article uses "Nic. G. J. Ballanta-Taylor"; the hyphenated name continued to be used in the US. In 1925, the title page of Saint Helena Island Spirituals states it is "By Nicholas George Julius Ballanta-(Taylor)", while the foreword is signed "N. G. J. Ballanta." At least from 1937 forward, the articles in the Sierra Leone Daily Mail newspaper consistently used the surname "Ballanta".

Meeting both Walter Damrosch and Dr. Frank Damrosch in New York, Ballanta was given a scholarship to the Institute of Musical Art (later the Juilliard School of Music), receiving his diploma in 1924. His thesis was a symphonic work on African themes titled The Music of Africa.

George Foster Peabody persuaded Ballanta to visit Alabama, Georgia, and South Carolina to better understand the music of African Americans. While visiting the Penn School in South Carolina, Ballanta "showed a peculiar facility in quickly and accurately transcribing the Spirituals as he heard them sung by the pupils…." Ballanta's collection of 103 spirituals was published by G. Schirmer in 1925 as Saint Helena Island Spirituals.

=== Field research in Africa ===
Peabody funded Ballanta's field research from 1924 to 1926 in the Gambia, Sierra Leone, Gold Coast (Ghana), and Nigeria. In 1926, he returned to the US, reporting "I traveled about 7000 miles of country in West Africa on research work, during which time I collected over 2000 examples of African songs."

Because he was a composer, he took an interest in technical aspects of the music, such as scales, melody, rhythm, harmony, and form, the relationship between speech tones and melodic contours, and prosody and musical instruments. He observed the effect of social change on the music of West Africa, and tried to classify the region based on the presence or absence of "Western or Eastern influence".

In 1925, he received a Guggenheim Fellowship "to continue scientific studies of the musical conceptions of the African peoples and compare these ideas with the musical conceptions of ... European music". A second grant was awarded Ballanta Taylor in 1927, to continue his research into the musical conceptions of the African people."

For information on his work in Germany with Erich von Hornbostel at the University of Berlin, see Tobias Robert Kline's Moderne Traditionene: Studien zur postkolonialen Musikgeschichte Ghanas.

=== Educator (1940s–1960) ===
From the 1940s to 1960, Ballanta taught at the CMS Grammar School in Freetown. It is said that he died in Kissy in 1962. The exact date of his death has yet to be verified.

=== Operas ===
Scores for three folk operas or musical plays survive. Within them, Ballanta used elements of both European and African music, "which whilst being in the tradition of Western classical music was recognizably African."

The music to Afiwa survives in three forms: a complete orchestral score dated 1937, another orchestral score of the overture plus two pieces, and a piano vocal score lacking the overture. The text of the play is complete.

The text of Efua survives. The score includes the overture and only nine of nineteen pieces.

Boima survives only as individual instrumental parts. There is no text of the play, no vocal score, and no conductor's score.

For the early Freetown performances, casts were drawn from "members of the Old Girls Association of the Annie Walsh Memorial School."

=== Ballanta Academy ===
In 1995, the Ballanta Academy of Music was established in Freetown, Sierra Leone, as a memorial to Ballanta's life and work.

== Significance ==
J.H. Kwabena Nketia described Ballanta's place in the history of African music:

Though Ballanta’s observations were not always accurate, his approach to African music was more theoretical and systematic than that of most writers of his time, for he believed his mission was to undertake "scientific studies of the musical conceptions" of African peoples and "to compare them with those of the West." His significance in the history of musical scholarship in Africa therefore lies in (1) his emphasis on extensive fieldwork; (2) his theoretical and descriptive approach to African music; and (3) his regional and comparative approach to African music (now favored by many African musicians).

== Compositions ==
=== Published works ===
- "Andante", Op. 1. New York: G. Schirmer, 1915. Organ work. Print.
- Saint Helena Island Spirituals. Recorded and transcribed at Penn Normal, Industrial and Agricultural School, Saint Helena Island, Beaufort County, South Carolina. New York: G. Schirmer, 1925.

=== Manuscripts ===
The manuscripts are the property of the Logie Wright family in Freetown, Sierra Leone and were in the custody of the Cottey College Archives in Nevada, Missouri, US from 2002 to 2025. They are now in the custody of Cottey Professor Emeritus Dr. Dyke Kiel.

- Afiwa. Musical play. 1936. Unpublished.
  - Produced November 1936 in Keta, Gold Coast [now Ghana]. Not verified.
  - Produced with the same cast in December 1936 in Lome, Togo. Not verified.
  - First performed in Freetown, Sierra Leone in November–December 1937.
  - Performed 24–25 November 1941 in Freetown.
  - Performed in Freetown in the 1950s. Not verified.
  - Performed in 1996 in Freetown. Not verified.
  - Performed in 1997 in Freetown. Not verified.
  - Scheduled performances at Cottey College on 16–17 April 2010.
- Boima. Musical play. Performed in 1938. Unpublished.
- Efua. Musical play. Performed in 1938. Unpublished.
- The Fanti Spirituals. Manuscript of 3 songs by Rev. Gaddiel Robert Acquaah and Isaac D. Riverson. Unpublished.
- Sing Aloud to God Our Strength. Anthem for chorus and organ. Unpublished.

=== Unpublished ===
- Africa and the Africans. Overture. 1924.
- Among the Palm Trees. Overture. 1922.
- The Answer. Music for the Pageant. Performed in Boston, Massachusetts in about 1922.(Cromwell, 132)
- Asheeko. Music for the Pageant. Performed in Philadelphia, Pennsylvania in about 1922. (Cromwell, 132)
- Bangura King of Sandalla. Musical play. 1933. Said to have been produced in Onitsha, Nigeria. Not verified.
- Belshazzar's Feast. Cantata. 1919.
- Fatmata. Musical play. 1944.
- Feri Chine. Musical play. 1932. Said to have been produced in Lagos, Nigeria. Not verified.
- The Music of Africa. Symphony. 1924.
- Prelude for Organ. 1917.
- Tewo. Musical play set in the Mende region. 1940.

== Writing ==
- The Aesthetics of African Music. 1934. Unpublished treatise. Property of Ballanta Academy of Music; in custody of Cottey College.
- "Music of the African Races". N. G. J. Ballanta. West Africa: A Weekly Newspaper and Review. 14 June 1930. 752–3. Print.
- The Philosophy of African Music. Lost treatise; probably written after 1934.
