= Richard Bradfield =

Richard Bradfield (April 29, 1896 – May 1, 1981) was an American agronomist instrumental in the early formation of the Green Revolution.

Bradfield was one of three scientists, along with Elvin Stakman and Paul Mangelsdorf, commissioned by the Rockefeller Foundation in 1941 to make recommendations on increasing agricultural yields in Mexico. Their initial work developed into the Mexican Agriculture Program, out of which the Green Revolution emerged.

A native of West Jefferson, Ohio, Bradfield studied at Otterbein and Ohio State University before joining the faculty at University of Missouri.

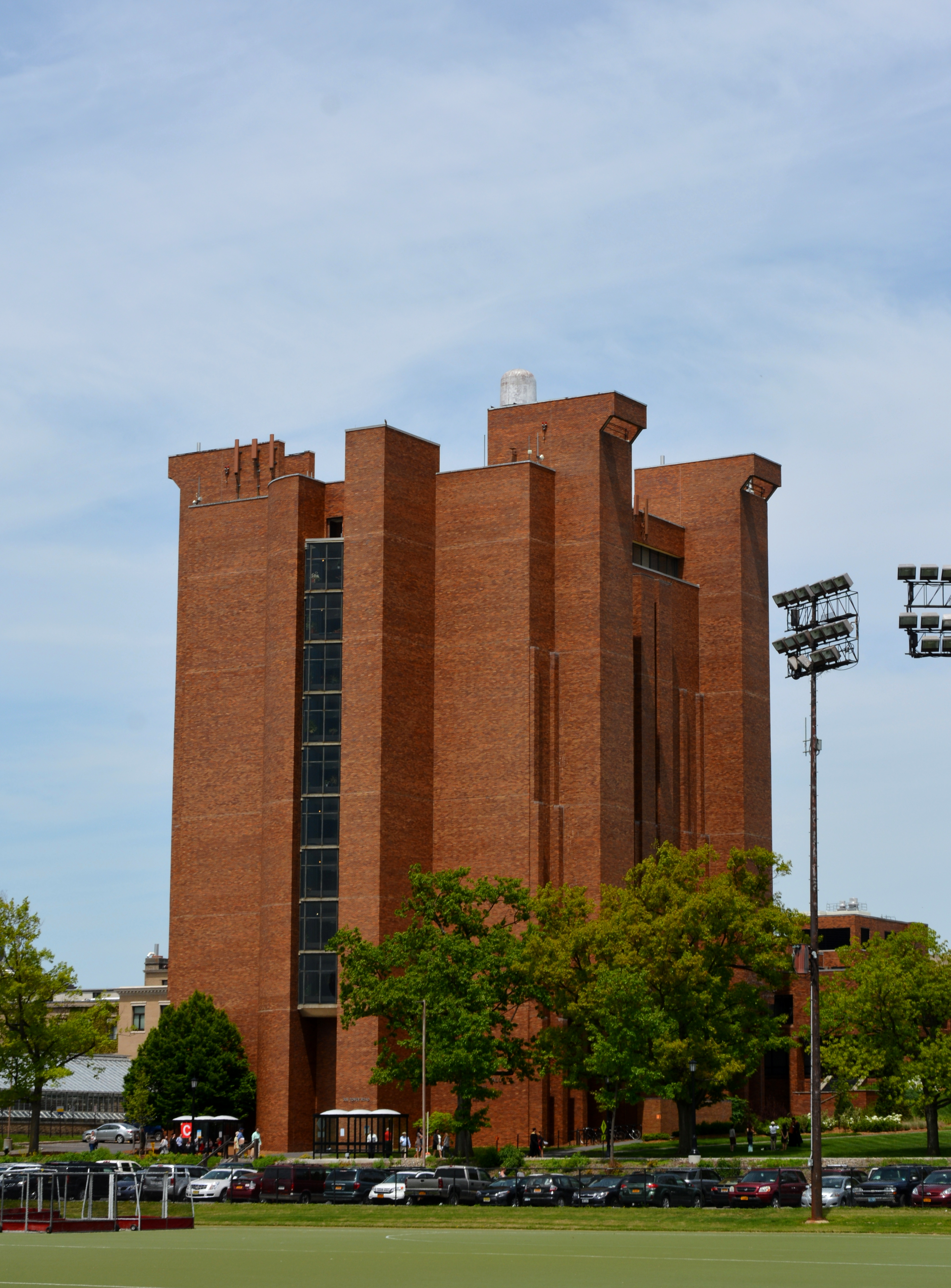
Bradfield Hall, Ithaca, New York

Bradfield served as a professor at Cornell University in soil technology from 1937 to 1961. Bradfield Hall, an fifteen-story Brutalist tower designed by Ulrich Franzen, is named in his honor.
