= Wolfgang Müller Kranefeldt =

Wolfgang Müller Kranefeldt (1892–1974) was a German psychiatrist, psychotherapist, and National Socialist, who was closely associated with Carl Jung. He was active in the AAGP and IAAGP in the 1930s and in 1936 joined the faculty of the Göring Institute (German Institute for Psychological Research and Psychotherapy) in Berlin. He was regarded as Jung's "leading pupil in Germany" and was analysed by Jung.

== Selected publications ==
- Die psychoanalyse: Psychoanalytische psychologie. W. de Gruyter & Co., Berlin & Leipzig, 1930.
- Therapeutische Psychologie : Freud - Adler - Jung. Mit einer Einführung von C. G. Jung, Berlin : de Gruyter, 2. Aufl., 1950
- Secret ways of the mind: A survey of the psychological principles of Freud, Adler, and Jung
- Sophrosyne und Tiefenpsychologie, Berlin : Hess, 1951
