= Violet Barbour =

American historian (1884–1968)

- Born: July 5, 1884; Cincinnati, Ohio
- Died: August 31, 1968 (aged 84)

Academic background
- Education: Cornell University

Academic work
- Discipline: Historian
- Institutions: Vassar College

Violet Barbour (July 5, 1884 Cincinnati, Ohio – August 31, 1968) was an American historian.

== Education ==
She graduated from Cornell University with a B.A., M.A., and Ph.D.

== Career ==
Beginning in 1914, she taught at Vassar College as a professor of English and European history.

== Awards ==
- 1925 Guggenheim Fellowship
- 1913 Herbert Baxter Prize by the American Historical Association

== Selected works ==
- Privateers and pirates of the West Indies, Cornell University, 1909
- Capitalism in Amsterdam in the Seventeenth Century, University of Michigan Press, 1950
- Henry Bennet, Earl of Arlington, Secretary of State to Charles II, American Historical Association, 1915
