= Lois Whitney =

American academic (1892–1982)

- Born: October 14, 1892; Oberlin, Ohio, U.S.
- Died: February 1982 (aged 89)
- Occupations: Literary scholar; painter

Academic background
- Education: University of Chicago; Radcliffe College
- Thesis: Studies in eighteenth century primitivistic theories of epic origins (1921)

Academic work
- Discipline: English literature
- Institutions: Grinnell College; University of Minnesota; Goucher College; Vassar College; Russell Sage College

Lois Whitney (October 14, 1892 – February 1982) was an American academic of English literature and painter who published the 1934 book Primitivism and the Idea of Progress in English Popular Literature of the Eighteenth Century. She worked as an English professor in Vassar College and Russell Sage College, and during her free time was a painter.

== Biography ==
Lois Whitney was born in Oberlin, Ohio on October 14, 1892. She was the daughter of Adelaide and Worrallo Whitney, the latter of whom worked more than three decades as a teacher at Bowen High School and Hyde Park High School.

Whitney received her BS (1914) and MA (1915) at the University of Chicago. After working as an instructor in English at Grinnell College (1916–1919) and spending a year studying at Radcliffe College (1919–1920), she returned to the University of Chicago to get her PhD in 1921. Her PhD thesis was titled Studies in eighteenth century primitivistic theories of epic origins. After spending two years as an instructor in English at the University of Minnesota (1921–1923), she started working at Goucher College as assistant professor of English, before moving to Vassar College in 1926. In 1937, she moved from Vassar to Russell Sage College. In 1947, she was promoted from assistant professor to professor, a rank she would hold until her retirement in 1958.

As an academic, she specialized in English literature. In 1929, she was awarded a Guggenheim Fellowship for "study[ing] the inter-relations of the [...] ideas of progress and primitivism, especially as they are illustrated by English literature of the eighteenth century". In 1934, she published the book Primitivism and the Idea of Progress in English Popular Literature of the Eighteenth Century. In 1939, she, Louis I. Bredvold, and Alan Dugald McKillop were the co-editors of the anthology Eighteenth Century Poetry & Prose.

Whitney also made paintings as a hobby during her free time. Among her paintings were oil paintings, silk screens, and watercolors. Some of her works appeared in local and national exhibitions, including the Luckey, Platt & Company Department Store, the Russell Sage College library, and the Women's University Club of New York. Whitney often visited Stowe, Vermont, where she once had an exhibition, because according to The Burlington Free Press, she "[found] Vermont landscapes so paintable, especially in the early spring and the late autumn when the colors are unusually lovely."

Whitney, by then a resident of Chicago, died in February 1982.

== Publications ==
- Primitivism and the Idea of Progress in English Popular Literature of the Eighteenth Century (1934)
