= William Weldon Watson =

William Weldon Watson IV (14 September 1899 in Eveleth, Minnesota – 3 August 1992 in Hamden, Connecticut) was a physicist specializing in isotope separation and a contributor to the development of the atomic bomb.

== Biography ==
Watson grew up in La Grange, Illinois. He received his B.S. in 1920, his M.S. in 1922, and his Ph.D. in 1924 from the University of Chicago, where he became a member of the faculty in 1924. He was a Guggenheim Fellow for the academic year 1928–1929. In 1929 he became an assistant professor at Yale University. Prior to 1940 Watson did research on molecular structures and spectra. Beginning in 1940 and for the remainder of his career, he studied isotope separation. By 1943 his research at Yale was part of the Manhattan Project. In 1943 Watson took a leave of absence from Yale to become one of the division directors under Arthur Compton at the Metallurgical Laboratory of the University of Chicago. In September 1945 Watson returned to Yale. In 1946 he became one of the five trustees of the U.S. Federal Government's laboratory that became Brookhaven National Laboratory in 1947. He was the chair of Yale's physics department from 1940 to 1961, when he resigned as chair but continued to be a professor. He retired as professor emeritus in 1968.

He died in 1992. He was one of the paternal uncles of the famous molecular biologist James Dewey Watson, whose paternal great-grandfather was William Weldon Watson III.
