= Merritt Y. Hughes =

- Born: May 24, 1893
- Died: May 12, 1971 (aged 77)
- Awards: Guggenheim Fellowship

Academic background
- Education: Boston University; University of Edinburgh; Harvard University

Academic work
- Main interests: literature of France, England and Italy

Merritt Yerkes Hughes (May 24, 1893 – May 12, 1971) Hughes was an expert in the literature of France, England and Italy. He was a recipient of the Guggenheim Fellowship in 1925, the first year they were given.

== Life ==
Hughes was born May 24, 1893, in Philadelphia; he received a bachelor's degree from Boston University in 1915, a master's degree from the University of Edinburgh in 1918, a Ph.D. from Harvard University in 1921 and a D.Litt. from the University of Edinburgh in 1950.

Starting in 1922 he was a professor at the University of California, Berkeley. He subsequently served on the faculty at the University of Wisconsin from 1936 until his retirement in 1963. At the University of Wisconsin, he was the chairman of the English department for a tenure of ten years.

In 1922, Hughes' "Study of Dante in France since 1870" divided the annual prize of the Dante Society of America.

In 1929 Hughes had published a volume entitled Virgil and Spenser. Amongst other works, he edited a compilation of the complete works of John Milton.

Hughes died in Madison, Wisconsin on May 12, 1971.
