= Melvin Lorrel Nichols =

American chemistry professor and author

Melvin Lorrel "Pete" Nichols (November 30, 1894 – March 29, 1981) was an American chemistry professor and author.

== Early life ==
Nichols was born in Dayton, Ohio, the son of Joseph Wiseman Nichols, a cabinetmaker, and Sarah Rebecca Heidelbaugh. He was the youngest of six children.

== Career ==
Nichols was awarded his PhD from Cornell University in 1922. His thesis was “Dinitrosoresorcinol as a reagent for the quantitative determination of cobalt in the presence of nickel and other metals of the third group”.

He was awarded a Guggenheim Fellowship in Chemistry in 1929.

Nichols was on the faculty at Cornell University from 1923 to 1962, rising to become Emeritus Professor of Chemistry.

“Pete” Nichols' wrote two textbooks on analytical chemistry, Gas Analysis, co-authored with L.M. Dennis, and Laboratory Manual of Analytical Chemistry. In 1950, Pete Nichols agreed to become executive director of Cornell's Chemistry Department, a new position which involved supervision of the support facilities and the non-academic staff of what had become a large and complex establishment. He held this position until his retirement in 1962.

He died in California on March 29, 1981.

== Personal life ==
He married Mary N Bancroft in 1926. They had one daughter, Sarah, "Sally".
