= Paul Knaplund =

American historian

Paul A. Knaplund (February 5, 1885, Saltstraumen, in Bodø Municipality, Norway – April 8, 1964, Madison, Wisconsin) was a Norwegian-American professor of history at the University of Wisconsin–Madison. He specialized in the history of the British Empire.

== Biography ==
He was raised on the Knaplundsjyen farm on the island of Knaplundsøya in Bodin Municipality (now part of Bodø Municipality). He grew up as the youngest in a family with 10 children. His parents were Martinus Johnsen Knaplund (1832–1919) and Kristina née Andreasdatter (1839–1919).

Knaplund emigrated from Norway to the United States and established his residence at Ostrander, Minnesota in the spring of 1906. He worked on the farm of Norwegian-American Hans Christensen in 1906 and 1907. Knaplund became a naturalized U.S. citizen at Red Wing, Minnesota on October 4, 1913. He graduated from Red Wing Lutheran Seminary (now St. Olaf College) with B.A. in 1913 and from the University of Wisconsin with M.A. in 1914 and with Ph.D. in 1919. He was a history teacher at Decorah High School in Decorah, Iowa from 1914 to 1916. In the history department of the University of Wisconsin-Madison, he was an assistant from 1913 to 1914 and from 1916 to 1917, an instructor from 1917 to 1921, an assistant professor from 1921 to 1925, an associate professor from 1925 to 1927, and a full professor from 1927 to 1955, when he retired as professor emeritus.

Knaplund lived in England and did research in British archives from 1922 to 1923. He was the first American historian to obtain access to William Ewart Gladstones' private papers. Knaplund's books, Gladstone and Britain's Imperial Policy (1927) and Gladstone's Foreign Policy (1935) resulted from his study of Gladstone's papers. He published articles in the Canadian Historical Review, the American Historical Review, Historisk Tidsskrift (Oslo), the American Journal of International Law, and Current History.

Knaplund was a Guggenheim Fellow for 6 months during the academic year 1926–1927, when he studied sources in several libraries in England. He married Dorothy King of Chicago on June 19, 1926. They had two children: Katherine Barbara in 1927 and Paul William in 1928.

During the Second World War, Professor Knaplund helped Norwegians in exile in the United States. In 1953 he was made a knight of the Order of St. Olav.

He edited the foreign affairs speeches of Sir Edward Grey, British Foreign Minister at the outbreak of World War I, and much other correspondence of historical importance. Dr. Knaplund was John Hay Whitney Professor at Wells College, Aurora, N. Y., in 1955. He served as a research associate at Duke University in 1956, and as Fulbright lecturer at the United College of the West Indies in 1956‐57.

Knaplund published his autobiography in 1963. It contains detailed descriptions of the conditions of Saltstraumen and its environs at the time he grew up and when he visited there in 1916 and 1923, as well as an elaboration of social identity as a Norwegian and an American.

Knaplund has his burial place in Forest Hill Cemetery in Madison. Upon his death he was survived by his widow, his son, his daughter, and six grandchildren.

== Selected publications ==
=== Articles ===
- Knaplund, Paul (1922). "Intra-Imperial Aspects of Britain's Defence Question, 1870–1900". Canadian Historical Review. 3 (2): 120–142. doi:10.3138/CHR-03-02-02. S2CID 161908854. online text
- —— (1923). "Gladstone's Views on British Colonial Policy". Canadian Historical Review. 4 (4): 304–315. doi:10.3138/CHR-04-04-02.
- —— (1924). "Sir James Stephen and British North American Problems, 1840–1847". Canadian Historical Review. 5: 22–41. doi:10.3138/CHR-05-01-03. S2CID 162154242.
- —— (1925). "Finmark in British Diplomacy, 1836-1855". The American Historical Review. 30 (3): 478–502. doi:10.2307/1835577. JSTOR 1835577.
- —— (1927). "The Buller-Peel Correspondence Regarding Canada, 1841". Canadian Historical Review. 8: 41–50. doi:10.3138/CHR-08-01-04. S2CID 161524151.
- —— (1929). "Mr. Oversecretary Stephen". The Journal of Modern History. 1: 40–66. doi:10.1086/235427. S2CID 144430322.
- —— (1934). "Gladstone on the Red River Rebellion, 1870". The Mississippi Valley Historical Review. 21 (1): 76–77. doi:10.2307/1896405. JSTOR 1896405.
- —— (1935). "The Armaments on the Great Lakes, 1844". The American Historical Review. 40 (3): 473–476. doi:10.2307/1838905. JSTOR 1838905.
- —— (1952). "Some Acton Letters". The Catholic Historical Review. 38 (2): 183–187. JSTOR 25015419.
- —— (1954). "Rasmus B. Anderson, Pioneer and Crusader". Norwegian-American Studies. 18: 23. doi:10.1353/nor.1954.a798968. S2CID 247621997. Archived from the original on 2020-10-19. (See Rasmus B. Anderson.)
- —— (1959). "Sir Arthur Gordon and New Zealand, 1880-1882". Pacific Historical Review. 28 (2): 155–172. doi:10.2307/3636543. ISSN 0030-8684. JSTOR 3636543.
- —— (1961). "Gladstone-Gordon Correspondence, 1851-1896: Selections from the Private Correspondence of a British Prime Minister and a Colonial Governor". Transactions of the American Philosophical Society. 51 (4): 1–116. doi:10.2307/1005834. JSTOR 1005834.

=== Books ===
- Gladstone and Britain's Imperial Policy. London: Allen & Unwin. 1927.
- Gladstone's Foreign Policy. New York: Harper. 1935. Knaplund, Paul (1970). 1970 pbk reprint. Psychology Press. ISBN 9780714614908.
- The British Empire, 1815-1939. New York: Harper & Brothers. 1941; 850 pages
  - Imperio británico, 1815-1939. México, D.F.: Ediciones Minerva, s. de r. l. 1945.
- Britain: Commonwealth and Empire, 1901-1955. London: Hamish Hamilton. 1956.
- Moorings old and new: Entries in an immigrant's log. Madison, Wisconsin: State Historical Society. 1963; 276 pages; foreword by Merle Curti
- as editor:
- Letters from Lord Sydenham, governor-general of Canada, 1839-1841. London: G. Allen & Unwin. 1931.
- Letters from the Berlin embassy : selections from the private correspondence of British representatives at Berlin and Foreign Secretary Lord Granville, 1871-1874, 1880-1885. Washington, D.C.: U.S. Government Printing Office. 1944.

== Sources ==
- Bodin Bygdebok, II, 6 A-B, Straumen. Bodø, 2001.
- Simensen, J. Fra Saltstraumen til imperiehistorie: Paul Knaplund, norskamerikaner og historieprofessor. I E. Niemi & C. Smith-Simonsen (eds.), Festskrift til Randi Rønning Balsvik (pp. 89–105). Oslo: Akad. Publ., 2009.
