= Ulrich Franzen =

German-American architect (1921–2012)

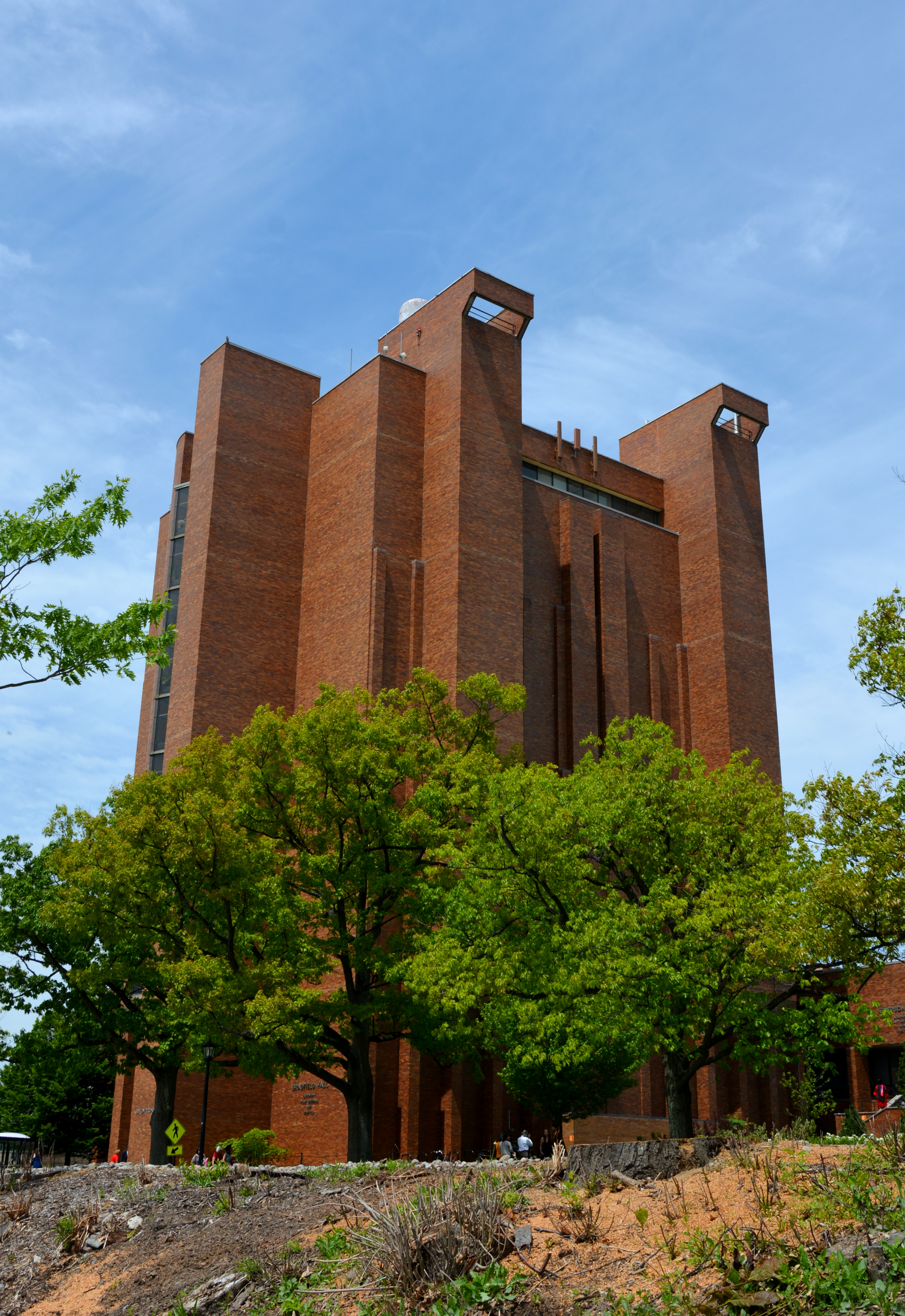
Bradfield Hall at Cornell University (Ithaca, New York).

Ulrich Joseph Franzen (January 15, 1921 – October 6, 2012) was a German-born American architect known for his "fortresslike" buildings and Brutalist style.

== Life and career ==
Franzen was born in Düsseldorf, Germany, the son of Eric and Lisbeth Hellersberg Franzen. They emigrated to the United States in 1936. He lived with his mother and a younger brother once his parents divorced. He obtained an undergraduate degree from Williams College, and after one semester at the architectural school at Harvard University, joined the Army. After World War II ended, he obtained a master's degree from Harvard in 1950. By 1951, he was working for I. M. Pei. He left Pei and formed his own firm, Ulrich Franzen & Associates, in 1955.

The Alley Theatre in Houston, Texas, which was completed in 1968, was Franzen's first prominent solo project. Franzen also designed the headquarters for the Miller Brewing Company in Milwaukee, WI (completed 1976). His other notable projects include the East and West towers at Hunter College (completed in 1984 after a long delay due to the financial crisis in New York City), and the Philip Morris headquarters in New York City (completed in 1982).

Franzen died on October 6, 2012, in Santa Fe, New Mexico, survived by his wife Josephine. He was 91.

== Notable works ==
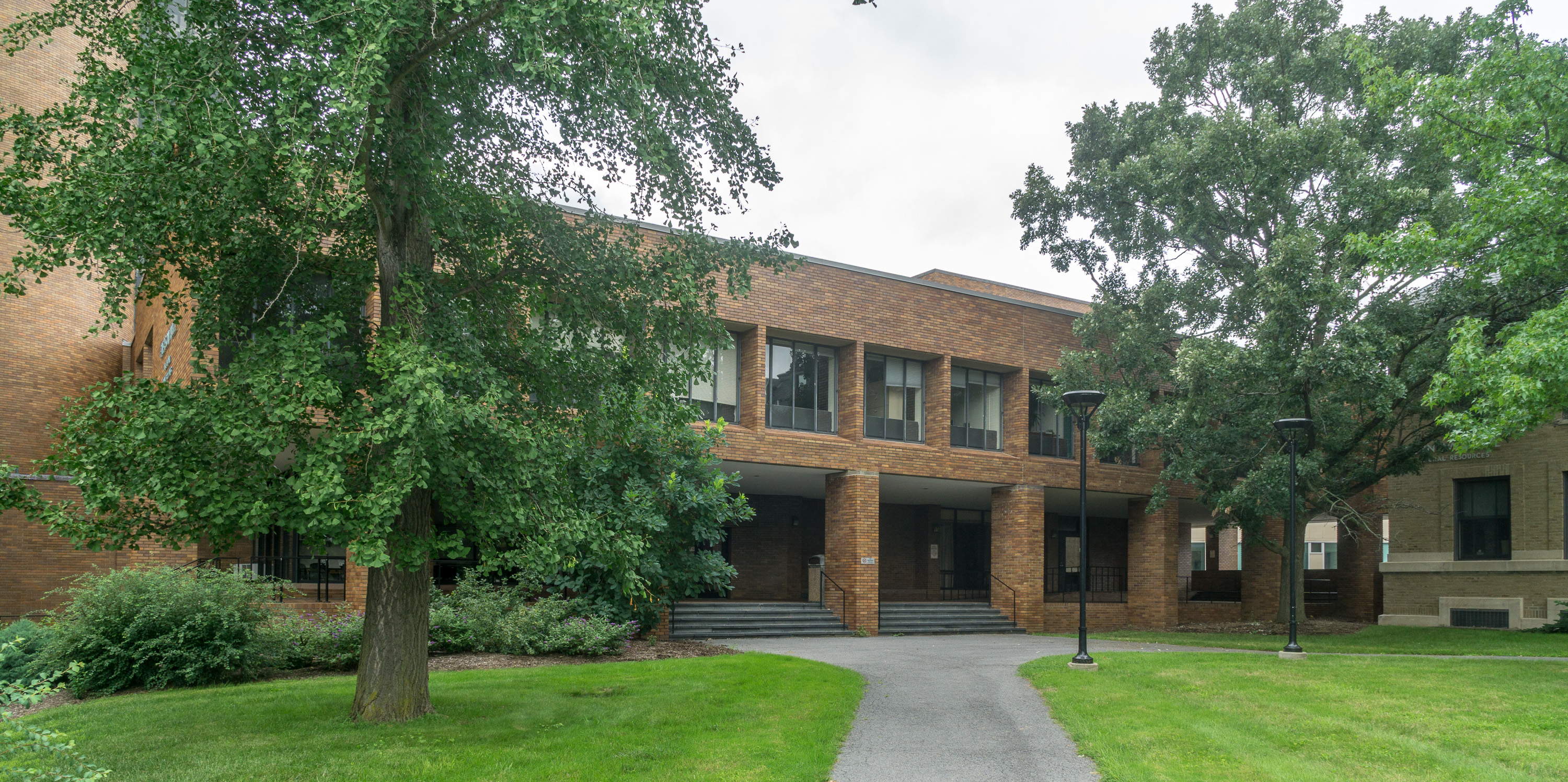
Emerson Hall at Cornell University (Ithaca, New York).

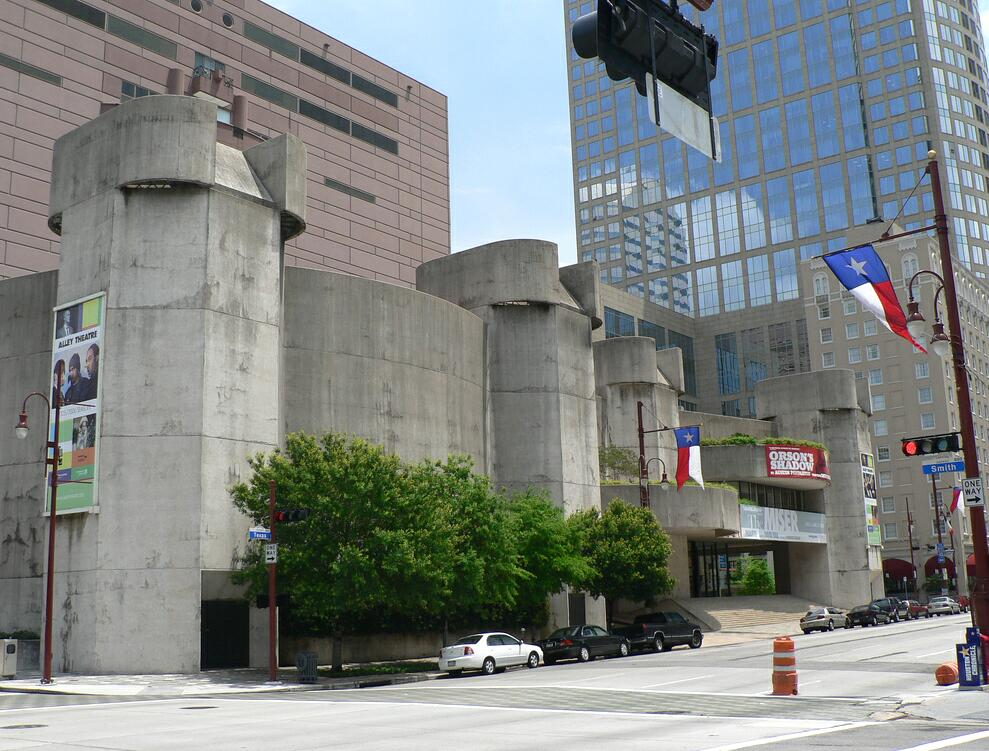
Alley Theatre, Houston

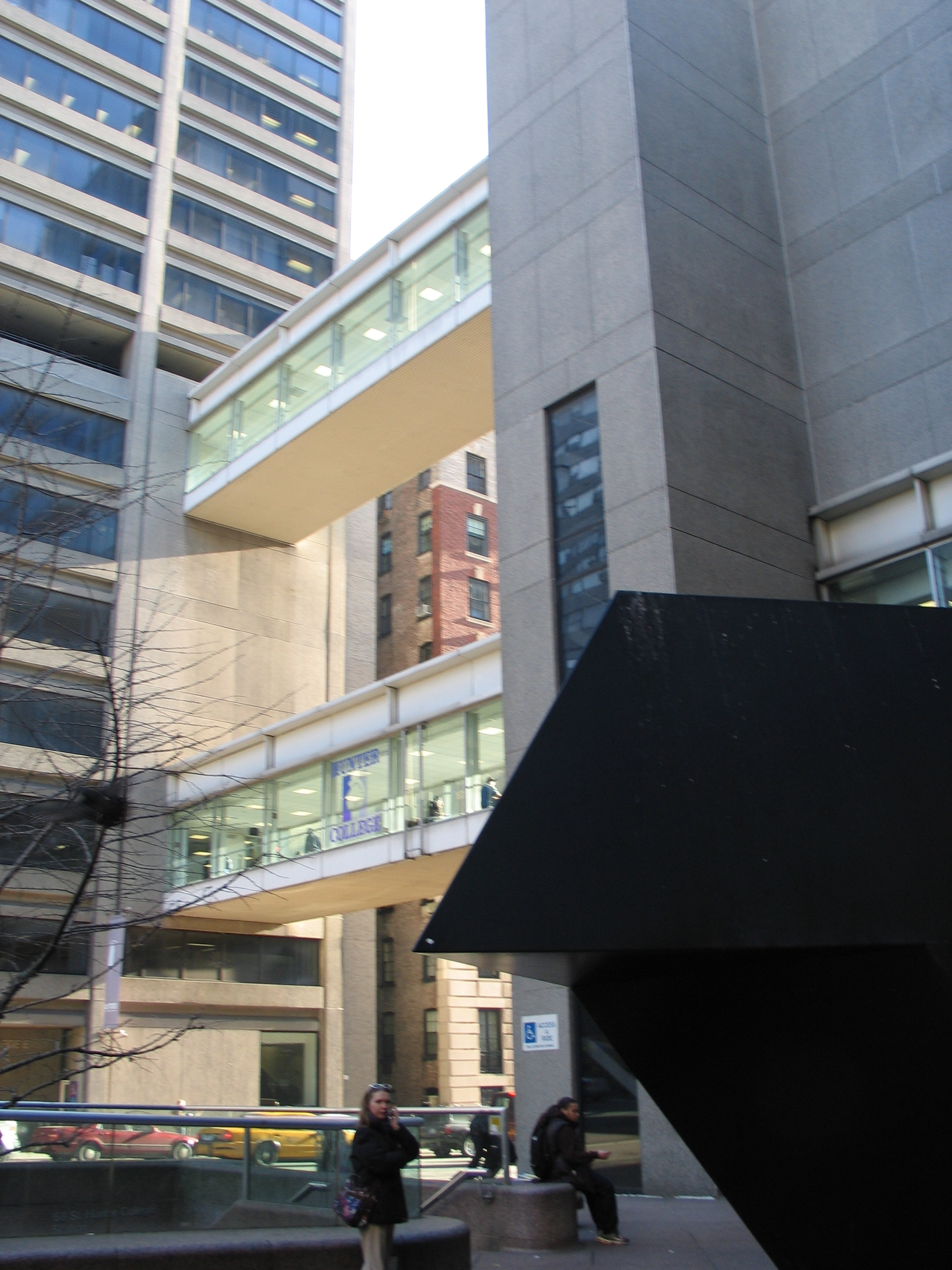
View of the bridges between the East and West Buildings at Hunter College

- 1957: Towers House, Essex, Connecticut
- 1958: Barkin, Levin & Company Office Pavilion, Long Island City, New York
- 1958: Beattie House, Rye, New York
- 1959: Weissman House, Rye, New York
- 1961: Miller/Efinger House ("Prism in the Pines"), Brewster, New York
- 1963: Bernstein House, Great Neck, New York
- 1963: Dana House, New Canaan, Connecticut
- 1963: Whiting Dress Factory, Pleasantville, New York
- 1964: Castle House, New London, Connecticut
- 1965: Buttenweiser House, Mamaroneck, New York
- 1966: The Folly at Field Farm, Williamstown, Massachusetts
- 1968-1970: Paraphernalia Store, Lexington Avenue, New York City, New York
- 1968: Bradfield Hall (agronomy building), Ithaca, New York
- 1968: Emerson Hall, Cornell University, Ithaca, New York
- 1968: Alley Theatre, Houston, Texas
- 1969: “The Street” Urban Concept
- 1969-1972: University of New Hampshire, Durham, New Hampshire
- 1969-1972: Harpers Ferry Center, West Virginia
- 1969: The Cooper Union, New York City, New York (Entwurf)
- 1970: First Unitarian Church, Richmond, Virginia
- 1974-1975: Franzen Penthouse, New York City, New York
- 1974-1978: The Harlem School of the Arts, New York City, New York
- 1974: First City National Bank, Binghamton, New York
- 1974: Multi-Cat Research Tower (Veterinary School) at Cornell University, Ithaca, New York
- 1974: The Evolving City
- 1975-1984: Hunter College, New York City, New York
- 1978-1979: Franzen House, Bridgehampton, New York
- 1978: Krauss House, Old Westbury, New York
- 1980-1981: University Center at University of Michigan, Flint, Michigan
- 1980-1982: Miller Brewing Visitors Centers
- 1981: Boyce Thompson Institute for Plant Research, Ithaca, New York
- 1983: Champion International, Stamford, Connecticut
- 1984: Philip Morris Headquarters, New York City
- 1985: Glimcher House, Long Island, New York
- 1994: Morris House, Greenwich, Connecticut
Selected works of Ulrich Franzen
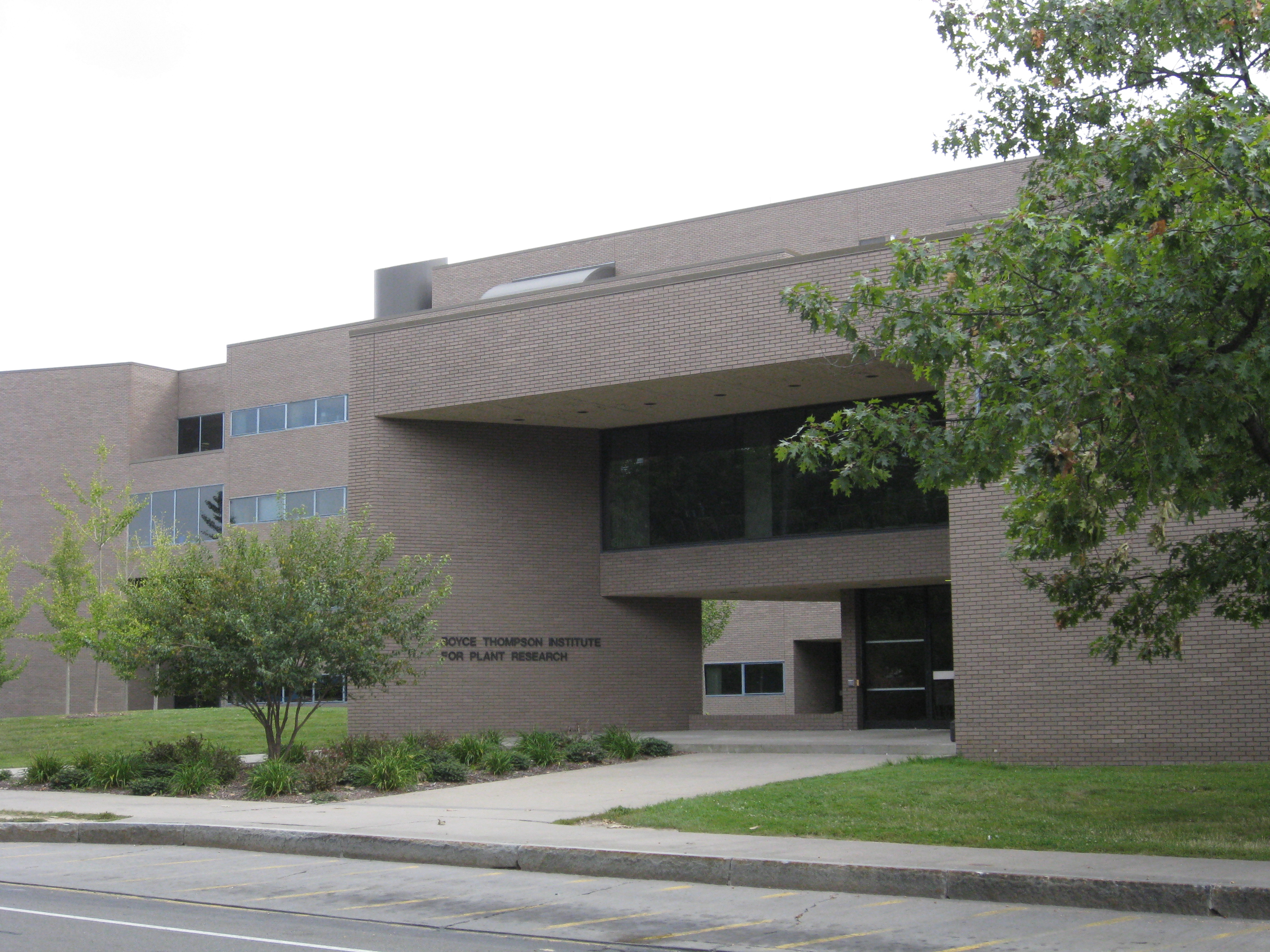
Boyce Thompson Institute for Plant Research, Ithaca, New York

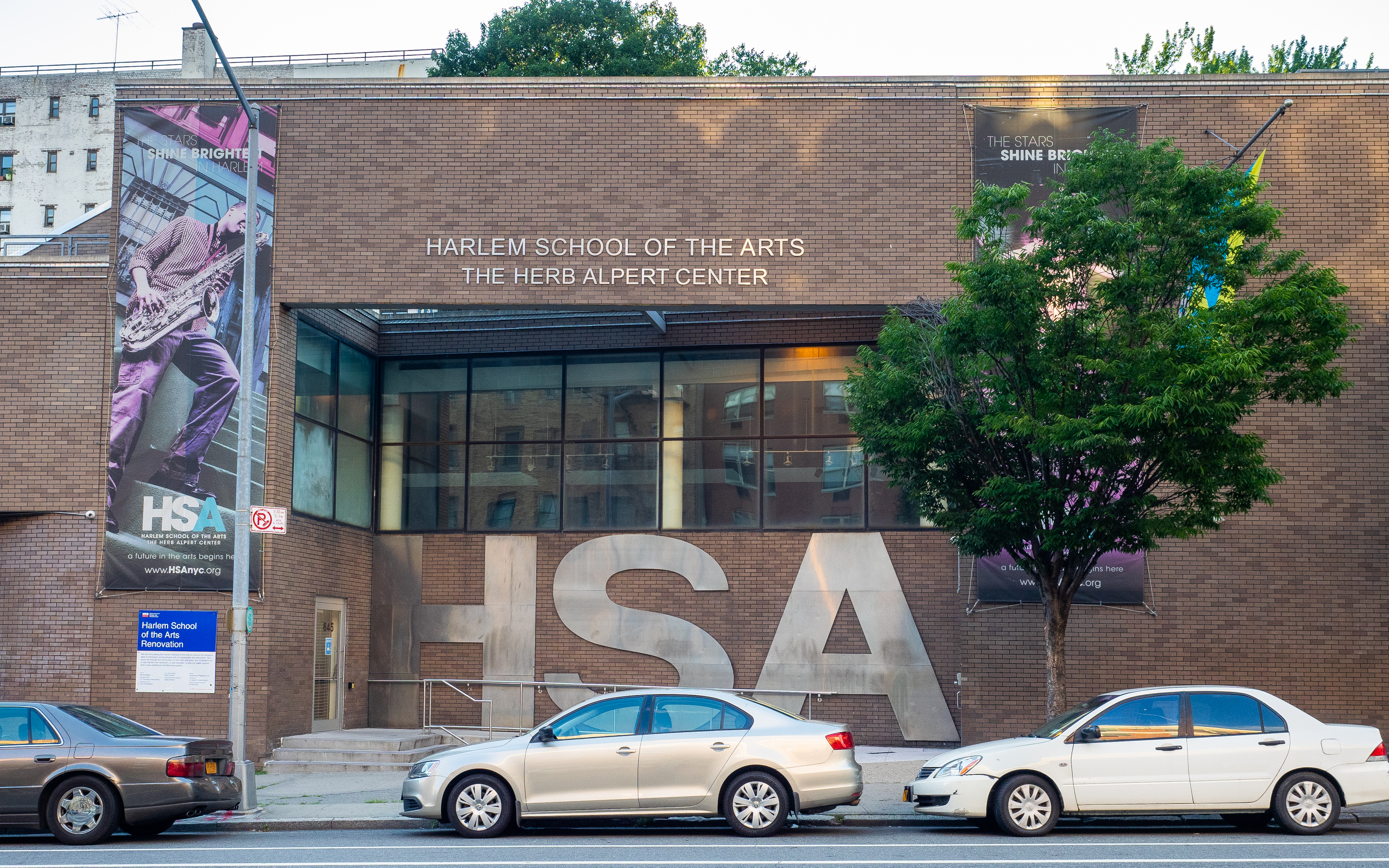
The Harlem School of the Arts building in Harlem, Manhattan

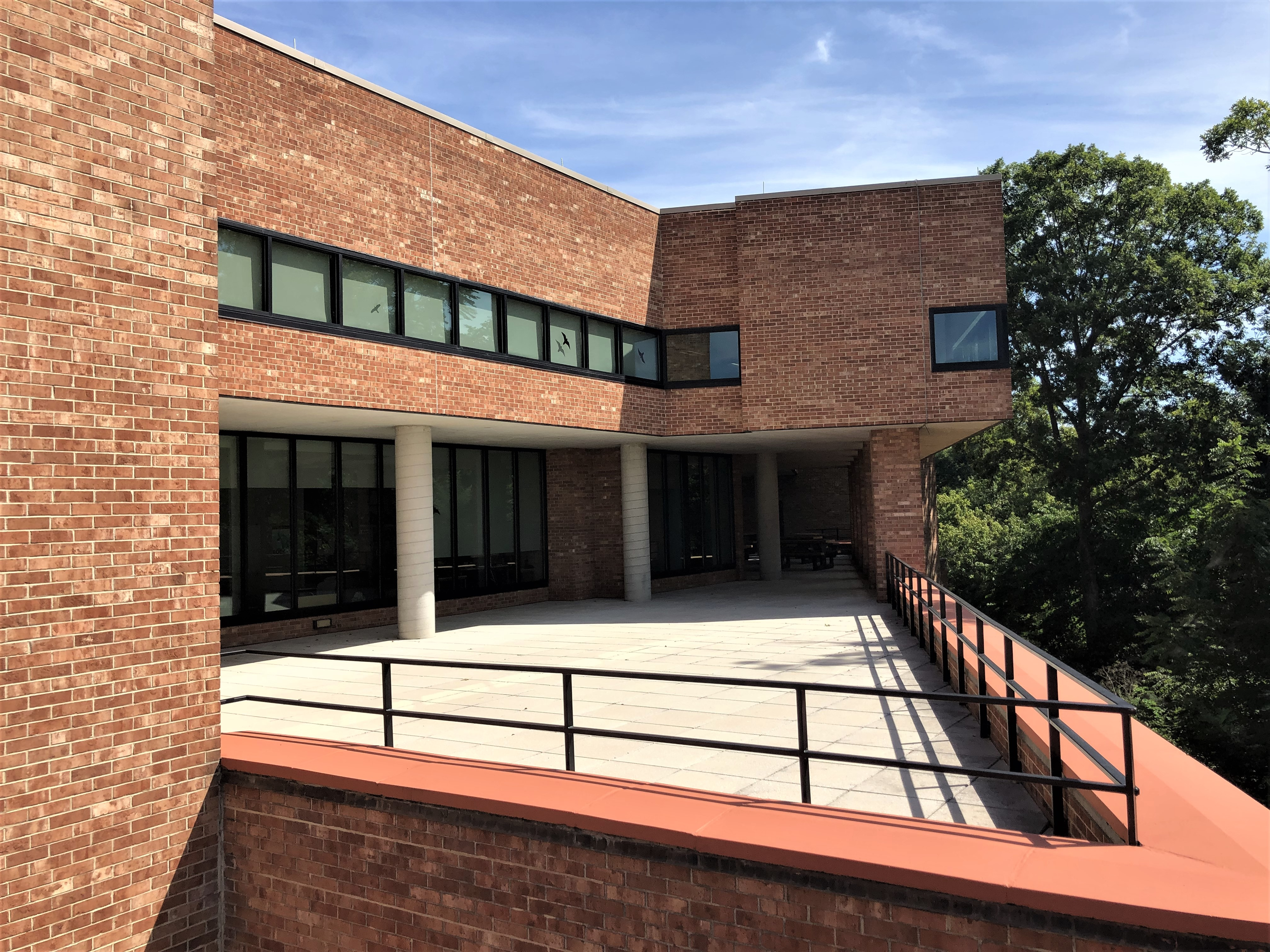
National Park Service Interpretive Design Center (Harpers Ferry Center)
