= Quinto Maganini =

American classical composer

- Born: 30 November 1897; Fairfield, California
- Died: 10 March 1974 (aged 76); Greenwich, Connecticut

Quinto Maganini (30 November 1897 – 10 March 1974) was an American composer, flautist, and conductor.

== Biography ==
Quinto Maganini was born in Fairfield, California, but he spent much of his life in New York City. He worked as a flautist in the San Francisco Symphony Orchestra, the New York Symphony Orchestra, and the Russian Symphony Orchestra.

While playing flute and piccolo in John Philip Sousa's band in San Francisco, he was discovered by American conductor Walter Damrosch, who invited him to join the New York Symphony Orchestra. As a member of the orchestra, he studied flute with Georges Barrère.

In 1927, he won a Pulitzer Prize for several of his compositions, including his symphonic poem Tuolumne, California Rhapsody; A Cuban Rhapsody and Songs of the Chinese. In 1928, he received a Guggenheim Fellowship to compose a symphony on the life of Napoleon I, a violin sonata and an opera based on Bret Harte's The Bellringer of Angels. These awards enabled him to travel to France, where he studied composition with Nadia Boulanger at the American Conservatory at Fontainebleau.

In 1931, he founded the New York Sinfonietta and served as its conductor. Some of their repertoire included Baroque works he had found through his research in France.

From 1940 to 1967, he served as principal conductor of the Norwalk Symphony Orchestra. In his tenure, he expanded the symphony's repertoire to include larger works, like the symphonies of Gustav Mahler.

== Compositions ==
His principal compositions include Tuolumne, California Rhapsody for trumpet and orchestra (1926), A Cuban Rhapsody (1926), Songs of the Chinese for women's voices and instrumental ensemble (1926), and a flute sonata (1928).

A 1925 New York Symphony program note for a performance of Maganini's "Tuolomne: A Pastoral Scene"—while he was the orchestra's 3rd flute and piccolo—chronicled much of his then-recent work: "The majority of his compositions are for the flute, or for that instrument in combination with others or with the human voice. These include two quartets for flutes, 'The Realm of Dolls' and 'Scenes from the City of Saint Francis-by-the-Sea'; 'Prelude to Pan,' 'Caprice Terpsichore,' 'A Waltz of the Stars,' and 'Claire de Lune' for flute solo; 'The Snake Charmer,' for flute, voice and piano; 'The Cry of the Flute' for voice and flute; a 'Phantasy Japanoise,' for flute, oboe, viola, 'cello, harp, and Greek cymbals (also arranged for flute and piano). He has also written a one-act opera of California life, 'The Stranger,' a quintet for piano and strings, and number of songs and violin pieces, and a symphonic nocturne, 'Night on an Island of Phantas,' inspired by a visit to Guam while serving with the Army Transport Corps during the war [WWI]. A ballet for piano, flute and trumpet, called 'The Contrary Princess,' incidental music for Jane Cowl's production of 'Romeo and Juliet,' and 'La Rumba de Monteagudo,' a piece for chamber orchestra based on Cuban popular music, are among his most recent efforts."
