= Carl McKinley =

American composer

Carl K. McKinley (October 9, 1895 – July 24, 1966) was an American composer of classical music. Born in Yarmouth, Maine, he spent some time in Paris on a Guggenheim Fellowship. He studied music at Harvard University, and was granted a Naumberg Fellowship to study in New York City for the 1917–1918 school year. There he worked with Rubin Goldmark, Gaston Dethier, and Walter Henry Rothwell. He later played the organ in a church in Hartford, Connecticut, after which he spent four years playing the instrument in New York's Capitol Theatre. In 1929 he became a member of the faculty of the New England Conservatory of Music. His students there included Ivana Marburger Themmen.

McKinley wrote mainly for orchestra, and had pieces performed by the Philadelphia Orchestra and the New York Philharmonic. He also composed for organ, for chorus, and for piano, and wrote a handful of songs. He has been described as a "conservative modernist" who acknowledged that his own style borrows something from Richard Wagner.

He retired from the New England Conservatory in 1963, having reached the post of chairman of theoretical studies. Robert Cogan succeeded him. He died in Centerville, Massachusetts, in 1966, aged 71.

== Selected Compositions ==
- Indian Summer Idyl for orchestra
- The Blue Flower, premiered January 8, 1924, by the New York Philharmonic under Henry Hadley at the Metropolitan Opera House.
- Masquerade - an American Rhapsody, premiered 1926 by the New York Philharmonic, performed again in 1930 in New York and Philadelphia.
- Come, Thou Almighty King
- Scherzo-Fantasia for organ, published 1960 by H. W. Gray
- Ten Hymn Tune Fantasies for organ
