= Louis Booker Wright =

American writer (1899–1984)

Louis Booker Wright (March 1, 1899 – February 26, 1984) was an American author, educator and librarian.

Wright was the director of the Folger Shakespeare Library, the author of numerous books about the American colonial period, and in 1928 he was awarded the Guggenheim Fellowship.

== Life and career ==
Wright resided in Greenwood County, South Carolina, his birthplace, until he attended Wofford College, where he enlisted in the Student Army Training Corps. He was subsequently stationed at Plattsburgh, New York, for six months during World War I. He did not return directly to Wofford after the war, but spent several months as an airmail pilot before resuming his studies. In 1920 he graduated from Wofford with a B.A. in chemistry. In 1923, he became an English teaching assistant at the University of North Carolina at Chapel Hill, where he wrote his master's thesis in 1924. In 1926, he received his PhD from Chapel Hill and became an assistant professor of English there. During this period, he married Francis Black. Louis and Francis moved to London in 1928 upon his reception of a Guggenheim Fellowship.

In 1931, joined the staff of the Huntington Library as an administrator and scholar. Much of his research at Huntington was concerned with the English Renaissance and the colonial period of the United States. While at the Huntington, he also served as a visiting professor at the University of California, Los Angeles, the California Institute of Technology, and Pomona College.

Before his appointment as director of the Folger Shakespeare Library in 1947, Wright was awarded an honorary Doctor of Letters by Princeton University. He officially began working for the Folger in the summer of 1948. While director, Wright used administrative insight gained at the Huntington to initiate more modern and efficient practices at the Folger, adding reference works and improving lighting in the main research room. During his time as director, Folger also adopted the Library of Congress' classification system. With Virginia LaMar, the Folger's executive secretary, Wright edited an early series of Folger Shakespeare Library editions of Shakespeare's plays, drawing on Folio and Quarto editions of the plays and compiling notes to make the plays as accessible as possible to the casual reader. The editions were published in the late 1950s and early 1960s. He was elected to the American Philosophical Society in 1948 and the American Academy of Arts and Sciences in 1949. Following retirement Wright published some other books, including Barefoot in Arcadia, a coming of age memoir about his developmental years in South Carolina.

Wright gave the A.S.W. Rosenbach Lectures in Bibliography in 1966. He received the Cosmos Club Award in 1973.

Among the organizations Wright served after his retirement in 1968 were the National Geographic Society, the Modern Language Association, and the Harry S. Truman Institute for National and International Affairs. Wright died in 1984 of cardiovascular disease in Chevy Chase, Maryland. He is buried in West Oakwood Cemetery, Spartanburg, SC with his wife and her parents.

== Publications ==
Wright, Louis B. The First Gentlemen of Virginia, Intellectual Qualities of the Early Colonial Ruling Class. San Marino: Huntington Library Publications, 1940.

Wright, Louis B. The Cultural Life of the American Colonies, 1607-1763. London: Eyre & Spottiswoode, 1949.
Wright, Louis B. The Dream of Prosperity in Colonial America. New York: New York University Press, 1965. Wright, Louis B. "Life on the American Frontier." New York: Capricorn Books, 1971.

== Sources ==
- New General Catalog of Old Books and Authors
