= Robert Pierce Casey =

Robert Pierce Casey (1897–1959) was an American scholar of the Bible and of Patristics. He was Chair of the Department of Biblical Literature at Brown University.

The volume Biblical and Patristic Studies in Memory of Robert Pierce Casey, edited by J. Neville Birdsall and Robert W. Thomson (Freiburg, 1963) was produced in his honour.
