= Ralph Erskine Cleland =

American botanist (1892–1971)

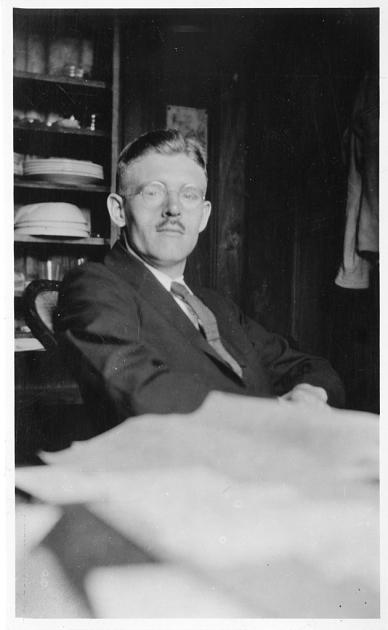
- Known for: genetics of the plant genus Oenothera
- Scientific career
- Fields: botany
- Institutions: Indiana University

Ralph Erskine Cleland (20 October 1892 – 11 June 1971) was an American botanist. In 1947, he was the President of the Botanical Society of America. He was also a professor at the Department of Botany at Indiana University.

Cleland's most seminal field of research concerned the genetics of the plant genus Oenothera. He discovered the structures of linked rings of meiotic chromosomes (not to be confused with ring chromosomes) that, by their interference with functions such as chromosomal crossover explained the unusual genetics and reproduction of plants in the genus Oenothera.

He was elected to the American Philosophical Society in 1932 and both the United States National Academy of Sciences and the American Academy of Arts and Sciences in 1942.
