= Isaac Fisher (educator) =

American educator

- Born: January 18, 1877; East Carroll Parish, Louisiana, US
- Died: August 23, 1957 (aged 80)
- Awards: Guggenheim Fellowship (1926)

Isaac Fisher (January 18, 1877 – August 23, 1957) was an American educator who graduated from Tuskegee Institute, served as principal at Branch Normal College, and taught at several other Historically Black Colleges and Universities. A protégé of Booker T. Washington, he advocated for vocational education for African Americans.

== Early life and career ==
Fisher was born in East Carroll Parish, Louisiana, on a plantation called Perry's Place. He was born to former slaves, and was the youngest of their sixteen children. Fisher graduated from the Tuskegee Institute in 1898, and was valedictorian of his class. He succeeded Joseph Carter Corbin as principal of Branch Normal College, from 1902 to 1911. During his tenure, the school concentrated on elementary and secondary education of students. He taught at Fisk University and the Hampton Institute.

He believed, as did his mentor Booker T. Washington, in industrial education for African Americans.

His papers are held at the University of Arkansas.

== Awards ==
- 1925 and 1926 Guggenheim Fellowship

== Works ==
- "The Negro Problem as we are trying to solve it at Tuskeegee", Proceedings of the Pennsylvania Yearly Meeting of Progressive Friends, The Pennsylvania Yearly Meeting of Progressive Friends, 1891
- Proceedings of the Annual Conference of the Presidents of Negro Land-Grant Colleges, 1933
- A College President's Story
