= Nathaniel Peffer =

American journalist

Nathaniel Peffer (Chinese: 裴斐; June 30, 1890 in New York City – April 12, 1964) was an American researcher on East Asian issues.

Educated at the University of Chicago, Peffer became an East Asian correspondent for the New York Tribune, and lived in China for 25 years. After invitations to lecture on East Asia at various American universities, he was appointed a lecturer at Columbia University in 1937, associate professor of International Relations there in 1939, and Professor in 1943. He retired from the university in 1958.

== Literary works ==
- The white man's dilemma - climax of the age of imperialism, 1927
- China - the collapse of a civilization, 1930
- Must we fight in Asia?, 1935
- Japan and the Pacific. 1935
- The Far East, a modern history. Ann Arbor, University of Michigan Press, 1958
