= Judith Blow Williams =

American historian (1890–1956)

- Born: August 1, 1890; New York City
- Died: October 16, 1956 (aged 66); Merritt Parkway, Connecticut, U.S.
- Occupation: Historian

Academic background
- Education: Vassar College; Columbia University
- Thesis: An Introduction to the Literature and Sources for the English Industrial Revolution (1916)

Academic work
- Discipline: History
- Sub-discipline: Economic history of the United Kingdom
- Institutions: Wellesley College

Judith Blow Williams (August 1, 1890 – October 16, 1956) was an American historian who specialized in the economic history of the United Kingdom, publishing the books A Guide to the Printed Materials for English Social and Economic History, 1750–1850 (1926) and British Commercial Policy and Trade Expansion, 1750–1850 (1972). She spent four decades as a professor at Wellesley College.

== Biography ==
Judith Blow Williams was born on August 1, 1890 in New York City. Her father Thomas Williams was a publishing executive who was manager of Charles L. Webster and Company.

After receiving her AB at Vassar College in 1912, she moved to Columbia University, where she got her AM in 1913 and eventually her PhD in 1916. Her dissertation was An Introduction to the Literature and Sources for the English Industrial Revolution. She joined the faculty of Wellesley College in 1916 as an instructor in history, and she was promoted to assistant professor in 1920. After spending a year as an American Association of University Women European Fellow (1921–1922), she was promoted to associate professor in 1926 and professor in 1935. In June 1956, she retired from Wellesley College after four decades of service.

As an academic, she specialized in the economic history of the United Kingdom. In 1926, she published the bibliography A Guide to the Printed Materials for English Social and Economic History, 1750–1850. In 1927 and 1929, she was appointed a Guggenheim Fellow, in both cases to work on research on the industrial revolution in England. She wrote scholarly reviews of books on the economic history of the United Kingdom. In 1935, she published a history of economic relations between the United Kingdom and Argentina in The Hispanic American Historical Review.

On October 16, 1956, four months after her retirement, while driving on the Merritt Parkway, Williams was fatally injured in a head-on collision with former Rhode Island Port Authority member Richard A. Moran.

At the time of her death, Williams was a resident of North White Plains, New York.

Williams was the owner of the master copy of E. W. Kemble's drawing of the titular main character of the Mark Twain novel Adventures of Huckleberry Finn, where it appeared on the first editions' frontispiece, having been personally gifted it by Twain himself as a young child. It later went into the possession of her brother Lessing Whitford Williams, who then donated it to the Mark Twain House.

== Publications ==
- A Guide to the Printed Materials for English Social and Economic History, 1750–1850 (1926)
- British Commercial Policy and Trade Expansion, 1750–1850 (1972)
