= Marion Elizabeth Blake =

American classical scholar

- Born: March 23, 1892; New Britain, Connecticut
- Died: September 11, 1961 (aged 69)

Academic background
- Education: Mount Holyoke College
- Alma mater: Cornell University

Academic work
- Discipline: Classical studies
- Institutions: American Academy in Rome; Carnegie Institution for Science; Winthrop College; Sweet Briar College; Mount Holyoke College; Converse College; Illinois College
- Main interests: Technology of Roman construction

Marion Elizabeth Blake (March 23, 1892 – September 11, 1961) was a classical languages professor who is known for her work in researching the technology of Roman construction. Blake died in Rome, Italy, in 1961.

== Early life and education ==
Marion Blake was born in New Britain, Connecticut, the daughter of Arthur C. Blake and Elizabeth Snow Blake. She attended college at Mount Holyoke College, where she earned her Bachelor of Arts degree in 1913, majoring in the Greek and Latin languages. Blake earned her Master of Arts degree (1917) and her Ph.D. degree (1921) from Cornell University.

== Career ==
Blake was a professor of classical languages at a series of five American colleges during the years from 1912 through 1938: Illinois College (1921–1922), Converse College (1922–1928), Mount Holyoke College (1929–1936), Sweet Briar College (1936), and Winthrop College (1937–1938).

Next, Blake took a professional position as a research associate in Roman Archaeology at the Carnegie Institute in Washington, D.C., (1938–47), and then she worked in Italy at the American Academy in Rome from 1947 to 1961.

The later work of Blake - that in Roman construction technology - was closely connected with that of Esther Boise Van Deman. Blake took up the task of completing Van Deman's unfinished manuscript on Roman construction technology following her death in 1937. Blake's third and final book, Roman construction in Italy from Nerva through the Antonines, was completed after her own death in 1961 by yet another woman author, Doris Taylor Bishop (1917–1969).

== Publications ==
- Ancient Roman construction in Italy from the prehistoric period to Augustus. A chronological study based in part upon the material accumulated by Esther Boise Van Deman. (Washington, 1947).
- Roman construction in Italy from Tiberius through the Flavians. (Washington, Carnegie Institution of Washington, 1959).
- Roman construction in Italy from Nerva through the Antonines. Edited and completed by Doris Taylor Bishop (1917–69). (Philadelphia, American Philosophical Society, 1973).
