= List of Guggenheim Fellowships awarded in 1939 =

Sixty-nine Guggenheim Fellowships were awarded in 1939.

== 1939 U.S. and Canadian Fellows ==
Category	Field of Study	Fellow	Institutional association	Research topic	Notes	Ref
Creative Arts	Fiction	Harold Augustus Sinclair		Writing		
Creative Arts	Fiction	Robert Penn Warren	Louisiana State University	Writing	Also won in 1947	
Creative Arts	Fiction	Richard Wright	Federal Writers' Project	Native Son (published 1940)		
Creative Arts	Fine Arts	Janet de Coux		Sculpture	Also won in 1938	
Creative Arts	Fine Arts	Adolf Dehn		Painting	Also won in 1951	
Creative Arts	Fine Arts	David Fredenthal	Cranbrook Academy of Art	Painting	Also won in 1938	
Creative Arts	Fine Arts	Josette Hébert-Coëffin			Also won in 1937	
Creative Arts	Fine Arts	John McCrady	Federal Art Project	Painting: Faith and lives of African Americans in the South		
Creative Arts	Fine Arts	Eugene Trentham		Painting		
Creative Arts	Fine Arts	Harry Wickey		Sculpture: Depictions of New York people	Also won in 1940	
Creative Arts	Music Composition	Ernst Bacon	Converse College	Composition	Also won in 1942, 1964	
Creative Arts	Music Composition	Paul Creston	St. Malachy Roman Catholic Church	Composition	Also won in 1938	
Creative Arts	Music Composition	Anis Fuleihan	G. Shirmer, Inc.	Composition		
Creative Arts	Music Composition	William Howard Schuman	Sarah Lawrence College	Composition	Also won 1940	
Creative Arts	Poetry	Oscar Brynes		Writing	Also won in 1938, 1944	
Creative Arts	Poetry	Kenneth Fearing		Writing	Also won in 1936	
Creative Arts	Theatre Arts	William Smith Clark II	University of Cincinnati	History of the stage in Ireland		
Humanities	American Literature	Charles John Olson	Harvard University	Critical history of the growth of Herman Melville through a study of his writing and reading	Also won in 1948	
Humanities	Biography	Arthur McCandless Wilson	Dartmouth College		Also won in 1956	
Humanities	Classics	Michael Ginsburg	University of Nebraska	Ancient Rome's New Deal	Also won in 1942	
Humanities	Classics	Richard Mansfield Haywood	Johns Hopkins University	Cities of Roman Africa, their political and economic organization, and their relations with the surrounding country and with each other		
Humanities	Fine Arts Research	Marvin Chauncey Ross	Walters Art Gallery	Corpus of all known Byzantine enamels, including a catalogue and an introduction giving the history and classification of Byzantine enamels	Also won in 1938, 1948, 1952	
Humanities	Fine Arts Research	Meyer Schapiro	Columbia University	Corpus of paintings, drawings, and ornament in manuscripts of southern France from the 10th to the end of the 12th century, with an analysis and interpretation of these works	Also won in 1942	
Humanities	Fine Arts Research	Carl Zigrosser	Weyhe Gallery		Also won in 1940	
Humanities	French History	Leo Gershoy	Sarah Lawrence College	Enlightened despotism	Also won in 1936, 1946, 1959	
Humanities	General Nonfiction	Herschel Brickell		History of Natchez, Mississippi		
Humanities	General Nonfiction	John Dos Passos		Essays on American conceptions of freedom of thought	Also won in 1940, 1942	
Humanities	General Nonfiction	John Joseph Mathews		Conflicting expressions of the American Indian and the invading European		
Humanities	German and East European History	O. Fritiof Ander	Augustana College	History of Sweden since 1815	Also won in 1938	
Humanities	Iberian and Latin American History	Lesley Byrd Simpson	University of California, Berkeley		Also won in 1939	
Humanities	Intellectual History	Ernest Campbell Mossner	Syracuse University	David Hume	Also won in 1945	
Humanities	Linguistics	Zellig Sabbettai Harris	University of Pennsylvania			
Humanities	Linguistics	Allen Walker Read	University of Chicago	Dictionary of "Briticisms"	Also won in 1938	
Humanities	Linguistics	Harold Whitehall	University of Wisconsin			
Humanities	Literary Criticism	Herbert Joseph Muller	Purdue University			
Humanities	Literary Criticism	Edmund Wilson		Writing	Also won in 1935	
Humanities	Medieval History	Gaines Post	University of Wisconsin, Madison	History of the relations of the Papacy and learning in the later Middle Ages	Also won in 1955	
Humanities	Medieval Literature	Charles W. Jones	Cornell University	History of physical sciences in the early Middle Ages	Also won in 1945	
Humanities	Music Research	R. D. Darrell	The Gramophone Shop	Book making possible for the listener a new approach to musical experience by use of mechanical media: phonograph, radio, and sound film		
Humanities	Philosophy	Everett John Nelson	University of Washington	Metaphysical foundations of formal logic; construction of a system of intensional logic and the application thereof to the problems of logic and logistic		
Humanities	Philosophy	Eliseo Vivas	University of Wisconsin			
Humanities	Renaissance History	Wallace K. Ferguson	New York University	Histories and historical interpretations of the Renaissance written from the 15th century to the present		
Humanities	United States History	Elmer Ellis	University of Missouri	Biographical study of Finley Peter Dunne and the influence of his writings, especially his Mr. Dooley essays, upon contemporary politics and political discussion		
Humanities	United States History	Howard Wolf	Cleveland News	History of American news services	Also won in 1940	
Natural Sciences	Astronomy-Astrophysics	Louis George Henyey	University of Chicago	Theory of the formation of stellar absorption lines		
Natural Sciences	Biochemistry	Isidore Gersh	Johns Hopkins Medical School	Intracellular distribution of certain organic compounds		
Natural Sciences	Biology	Gregory Pincus	Clark University	Developmental physiology of mammalian eggs and embryos	Also won in 1940	
Natural Sciences	Chemistry	Rose C. Slater	Newcomb College, Tulane University	Structure of crystals by methods of x-ray analysis		
Natural Sciences	Chemistry	Harold R. Snyder	University of Illinois	Configuration of nitrogen in organic compounds	Fellowship postponed until 1951	
Natural Sciences	Chemistry	Melville Lawrence Wolfrom	Ohio State University	General methods of investigating the organic structure of the natural products as carried on in several European laboratories		
Natural Sciences	Earth Science	Maurice Ewing	Lehigh University	Deep-sea investigations by gravitational and seismic methods	Also won in 1938, 1953	
Natural Sciences	Earth Science	Earl Hamlet Myers	Compton Junior College	Life cycles of the Foraminifera, with special reference to the role of these organisms in the sea and their significance in geological formations	Also won in 1938	
Natural Sciences	Earth Science	Chester Stock	California Institute of Technology	Vertebrate paleontological reconnaissance of Mexico	Also won in 1940	
Natural Sciences	Mathematics	Oscar Zariski	Johns Hopkins University	Theory of algebraic varieties from the standpoint of modern algebra		
Natural Sciences	Molecular and Cellular Biology	Alfred George Marshak		Mechanism of chromosome division, especially the nature of the chromosome structure as revealed by response to neutron bombardment in a cyclotron	Also won in 1938	
Natural Sciences	Molecular and Cellular Biology	Leland S. McClung	University of California	Certain disease-producing and food-spoiling bacteria		
Natural Sciences	Molecular and Cellular Biology	Emil L. Smith	Columbia University	Kinetics and mechanism of photosynthesis	Also won in 1938	
Natural Sciences	Organismic Biology and Ecology	Adriaan Joseph van Rossem	California Institute of Technology	European ornithological collections with a view to establishing a permanent nomenclature for American birds		
Natural Sciences	Physics	Hubert Maxwell James	Purdue University	Application of wave mechanics to the computation of intensities in band spectra		
Natural Sciences	Plant Science	Lawrence Rogers Blinks	Stanford University	Relations of metabolism to the bio-electric properties of large plant cells	Also won in 1948, 1957	
Natural Sciences	Plant Science	Earl Martin Hildebrand	Cornell University	Transmission of fruit plant diseases		
Natural Sciences	Plant Science	Hilda F. Rosene	University of Texas	Forces and structures involved in the absorption and transport of water by plants		
Social Sciences	Economics	Karl Richard Bopp	University of Missouri			
Social Sciences	Economics	Mary Barnett Gilson	University of Chicago			
Social Sciences	Economics	Elmer Wood	University of Missouri	Policy of the Bank of England, 1847-1873		
Social Sciences	Political Science	Karl Loewenstein	Amherst College	Research in South America		
Social Sciences	Political Science	Walter Rice Sharp	University of Wisconsin, Madison	Functional study of the administrative process at the international level		
Social Sciences	Psychology	Robert Tryon	University of California	Inheritance of ability to learn, based upon data derived from a series of experiments on the ability for successive generations of rats to learn their way through complicated mazes		

== 1939 Latin American and Caribbean Fellows ==
Category	Field of Study	Fellow	Institutional association	Research topic	Notes	Ref
Creative Arts	Fine Arts	Roberto Berdecio		Painting		
Creative Arts	Fine Arts	Carlos Orozco Romero				
Creative Arts	Fine Arts	Daniel Serra-Badué		Fine arts	Also won in 1938	
Humanities	Spanish and Portuguese Literature	Raimundo Lida	Universidad de La Plata	Aesthetic and poetics of George Santayana	Also won in 1959	
Natural Sciences	Mathematics	Alberto González Domínguez				
Natural Sciences	Mathematics	Mario O. González	Instituto de Matanzas	Differential equations, especially the theory of continuous groups		
Natural Sciences	Mathematics	Carlos Graef Fernández	Universidad Nacional Autónoma de México	Theory of probability and mathematical theory of statistics	Also won in 1937, 1938	
Natural Sciences	Medicine	Hugo Pablo Chiodi	Sauberan Foundation	Respiratory phenomena cause by muscular activity in health and disease	Also won in 1940	
Natural Sciences	Medicine	Raúl Palacios von Helms	Institute of Bacteriology, Chile	Filterable viruses, with special reference to rabies	Also won in 1940	
Natural Sciences	Medicine and Health	Henry N. Harkins			Also won in 1938, 1965	
Natural Sciences	Medicine and Health	Juan Pedro Picena	National University of the Littoral	Modern pathology		
Natural Sciences	Molecular and Cellular Biology	Julio de la Arena y Fernández	Universidad de la Habana	Cellular permeability and intracellular digestion in the protozoa		
Natural Sciences	Plant Science	Carlos Muñoz Pizarro	Universidad de Chile	Systematic botany, with special relations to native Chilean forge plants	Also won in 1938	
Social Sciences	Law	Silvio Arturo Zavala Vallado	Universidad Nacional Autónoma de México	Comparative study of the systems of forced labor in the Spanish and English colonies of North America	Also won in 1937	

== See also ==
- Guggenheim Fellowship
- List of Guggenheim Fellowships awarded in 1938
- List of Guggenheim Fellowships awarded in 1940
