= List of Guggenheim Fellowships awarded in 1937 =

Sixty-three Guggenheim Fellowships were awarded in 1937.

== 1937 U.S. and Canadian Fellows ==
Category	Field of Study	Fellow	Institutional association	Research topic	Notes	Ref
Creative Arts	Drama and Performance Art	Robert Ardrey	University of Chicago	Playwriting		
Creative Arts	Drama and Performance Art	Robert Turney		Playwriting	Also won in 1936	
Creative Arts	Fiction	Frederic Prokosch		Writing		
Creative Arts	Fine Arts	Ahron Ben-Shmuel		Sculpture	Also won in 1938	
Creative Arts	Fine Arts	Aaron Bohrod		Painting	Also won in 1936	
Creative Arts	Fine Arts	Jon Corbino		Painting	Also won in 1936	
Creative Arts	Fine Arts	Lu Duble	Bennett School	Sculpture	Also won in 1938	
Creative Arts	Fine Arts	William Gropper		Drawing		
Creative Arts	Fine Arts	George Grosz		Painting	Also won in 1938	
Creative Arts	Fine Arts	Josette Hébert-Coëffin			Also won in 1939	
Creative Arts	Fine Arts	Joe Jones		Painting: Conditions of the Dust Bowl		
Creative Arts	Fine Arts	Rico Lebrun	Art Students League		Also won in 1935, 1962	
Creative Arts	Music Composition	Ross Lee Finney	Smith College	Composition	Also won in 1947	
Creative Arts	Music Composition	Dante Fiorillo		Composition	Also won in 1935, 1936, 1938	
Creative Arts	Music Composition	Robert Guyn McBride	Bennington College	Composition		
Creative Arts	Photography	Edward Weston		Photographic satire in the West	Also won in 1938	
Creative Arts	Poetry	Sterling Allen Brown	Howard University	Long narrative poem		
Creative Arts	Poetry	Harold Lewis Cook		Writing		
Creative Arts	Poetry	Sonia Raiziss Giop	Girls' High School	Writing		
Creative Arts	Poetry	Jesse Hilton Stuart	Greenup County High School	Writing		
Creative Arts	Theatre Arts	Stewart Chaney		Research in Europe		
Creative Arts	Theatre Arts	Mordecai Gorelik		Influence of scientific techniques upon methods of stage design	Also won in 1935	
Humanities	British History	Holden Furber		Consolidation of British power in India		
Humanities	Classics	Charles Farwell Edson, Jr.		Historical geography and epigraphy of ancient Macedonia	Also won in 1936, 1956	
Humanities	Classics	Ernst Levy	University of Washington (visiting)	Development of Roman law in the western part of the empire during its decline		
Humanities	English Literature	Fannie Elizabeth Ratchford	University of Texas		Also won in 1929, 1957	
Humanities	Fine Arts Research	Lucy Driscoll	University of Chicago	Chinese art		
Humanities	Fine Arts Research	Kaj Klitgaard		Through the American Landscape (published 1941)		
Humanities	Fine Arts Research	Carl Schuster			Also won in 1938	
Humanities	General Nonfiction	Zora Neale Hurston		Practice of obeah	Also won in 1936	
Humanities	General Nonfiction	Max Norton		History of Socialist-Communist, Liberal-Democratic, Nationalist-Patriotic, and reactionary movements during the last 150 years		
Humanities	General Nonfiction	Donald Culross Peattie		Robert Owen's New Harmony experiment	Also won in 1936	
Humanities	Literary Criticism	Richard Palmer Blackmur		Henry Adams	Also won in 1938	
Humanities	Medieval History	John Life La Monte	University of Cincinnati	Biographical and genealogical catalogue of the Crusader states		
Humanities	Medieval Literature	Dorothy Bethurum	Lawrence College	Old and early Middle English homilies		
Humanities	Medieval Literature	Anselm Strittmatter	Saint Anselm's Priory	History of Christian life and thought	Also won in 1932	
Humanities	Near Eastern Studies	Samuel Noah Kramer	University of Chicago	History of Sumerian culture from 2000 BC	Also won in 1938, 1961	
Humanities	Philosophy	Paul Weiss	Bryn Mawr College	Foundations of ethics in the light of modern logic and metaphysics		
Humanities	Philosophy	Donald Cary Williams	University of California	Analysis and theory of knowledge		
Humanities	United States History	Edward Deming Andrews		History on the religious arts of the Shakers		
Natural Sciences	Applied Mathematics	Ronold W. P. King	Lafayette College	Research in Germany	Also won in 1957	
Natural Sciences	Astronomy and Astrophysics	Willem Jacob Luyten	University of Minnesota	Stars in the southern hemisphere	Also won in 1928, 1929	
Natural Sciences	Chemistry	Lawrence Olin Brockway	California Institute of Technology	Molecular studies of certain heavy metal carbonyls		
Natural Sciences	Earth Science	Charles Henry Behre, Jr	Northwestern University	Comparative study of zinc-lead deposits		
Natural Sciences	Earth Science	Aaron Clement Waters	Stanford University	Comparative study of metamorphic rock		
Natural Sciences	Medicine and Health	Allan Lyle Grafflin	Harvard University	Functional and cytological studies of the mammalian and human kidney	Also won in 1934	
Natural Sciences	Medicine and Health	Samuel Robert Means Reynolds	Long Island College of Medicine	Nature of the motility-stimulating action of Oestrin upon uterine muscles		
Natural Sciences	Molecular and Cellular Biology	Eric Glendinning Ball	Johns Hopkins University	Mechanism of biological oxidations	Also won in 1958	
Natural Sciences	Molecular and Cellular Biology	William Clouser Boyd	Boston University	Blood groups among people in southwestern Asia	Also won in 1935, 1961	
Natural Sciences	Molecular and Cellular Biology	Florence Barbara Seibert	Henry Phipps Institute	Research with Theodor Svedberg		
Natural Sciences	Molecular and Cellular Biology	Herbert Shapiro	Princeton University	Nerve activity at low oxygen pressures		
Natural Sciences	Molecular and Cellular Biology	James Batcheller Sumner	Cornell University	Research with Theodor Svedberg		
Natural Sciences	Organismic Biology and Ecology	Sydney William Britton	University of Virginia	Comparative study of tropical animals with those native to Virginia		
Natural Sciences	Organismic Biology and Ecology	George Whitfield Deluz Hamlett	United States Biological Survey	Embryology and reproductive cycles of various mammals	Also won in 1936	
Natural Sciences	Organismic Biology and Ecology	William Louis Straus, Jr	Johns Hopkins University	Embryological development of muscle function		
Natural Sciences	Physics	Hans Mueller	Massachusetts Institute of Technology	Structure and properties of liquids		
Social Sciences	Anthropology and Cultural Studies	Melville J. Herskovits	Northwestern University	Primitive economics		
Social Sciences	Economics	Frank Whitson Fetter		Theories of money, banking, and international finance in England, 1800-1870		
Social Sciences	Economics	Earl Jefferson Hamilton	Duke University	17th-century managed currency experiment of John Law		
Social Sciences	Political Science	Ralph Droz Casey	University of Minnesota	Political party propaganda campaigns		
Social Sciences	Political Science	Harwood Lawrence Childs	Princeton University	Historical study of labor and capital in German politics	Also won in 1946	
Social Sciences	Psychology	Donald Keith Adams	Duke University	Formulation of a theory of the changes in the structure of the mind that constitute mental development		

== 1937 Latin American and Caribbean Fellows ==
Category	Field of Study	Fellow	Institutional association	Research topic	Notes	Ref
Humanities	Iberian and Latin American History	Andrés Henestrosa	National University of Mexico	Significance of Zapotecan culture	Also won in 1936	
Natural Science	Mathematics	Carlos Graef Fernández	National Autonomous University of Mexico		Also won in 1938, 1939	
Natural Science	Medicine and Health	Joaquín Luco Valenzuela	Pontifical Catholic University of Chile	Physiology, especially the action of certain drugs on smooth muscle	Also won in 1938, 1957, 1968	
Natural Science	Medicine and Health	Alberto Marsal	National University of Córdoba		Also won in 1938	
Natural Science	Medicine and Health	Enrique Savino	National Department of Hygiene (Argentina)		Also won in 1935, 1936	
Natural Science	Molecular and Cellular Biology	Conrado Federico Asenjo	University of Puerto Rico	Systematic study of the chemical composition and active principles of the medicinal and poisonous plants of the West Indies	Also won in 1938, 1954	
Natural Science	Molecular and Cellular Biology	Santos Soriano	University of Buenos Aires	Microbiological studies in artificial production of bacterial variations		
Natural Science	Physics	Alfredo Baños, Jr.	National University of Mexico	Physical nature of dielectric constant and of the conductivity of dielectrics	Also won in 1935, 1936, 1957	
Social Sciences	Anthropology and Cultural Studies	Carlos García Robiou	University of Havana	Cuban prehistory	Also won in 1938	
Social Sciences	Law	Silvio Arturo Zavala Vallado	National University of Mexico	Comparative study of the systems of forced labor in the Spanish and English colonies of North America	Also won in 1939	

== See also ==
- Guggenheim Fellowship
- List of Guggenheim Fellowships awarded in 1936
- List of Guggenheim Fellowships awarded in 1938
