= List of Guggenheim Fellowships awarded in 1938 =

Fifty-eight Guggenheim Fellowships were awarded in 1938.

== 1938 U.S. and Canadian Fellows ==
Category	Field of Study	Fellow	Institutional association	Research topic	Notes	Ref
Creative Arts	Drama and Performance Art	Arthur Arent	Federal Theatre Project	Playwriting		
Creative Arts	Fiction	August William Derleth		Writing		
Creative Arts	Fiction	Clifford Shirley Dowdey		Writing		
Creative Arts	Fiction	Katherine Anne Porter		Writing	Also won in 1931	
Creative Arts	Fiction	Richard Wright		Writing		
Creative Arts	Fine Arts	Ahron Ben-Shmuel		Sculpture	Also won in 1937	
Creative Arts	Fine Arts	Janet de Coux		Sculpture	Also won in 1939	
Creative Arts	Fine Arts	Lu Duble		Sculpture	Also won in 1937	
Creative Arts	Fine Arts	David Fredenthal	Cranbrook Academy of Art	Painting	Also won in 1939	
Creative Arts	Fine Arts	George Grosz	Sterne-Grosz art school	Painting	Also won in 1937	
Creative Arts	Fine Arts	Rosella Hartman		Painting	Also won in 1934	
Creative Arts	Fine Arts	Frank Mechau		Mural paintings of Diego Rivera and José Clemente Orozco	Also won in 1934, 1935	
Creative Arts	Music Composition	Paul Creston	St. Malachy Roman Catholic Church	Composition	Also won in 1939	
Creative Arts	Music Composition	David Diamond		Composition		
Creative Arts	Music Composition	Dante Fiorillo		Composition	Also won in 1935, 1936, 1937	
Creative Arts	Music Composition	William Grant Still		Composition	Also won in 1934, 1935	
Creative Arts	Photography	Edward Weston		Western United States	Also won in 1937	
Creative Arts	Poetry	Oscar Brynes		Writing	Also won in 1939, 1944	
Creative Arts	Poetry	Rolfe Humphries	Woodmere Academy	Writing		
Creative Arts	Poetry	Carlyle Ferren MacIntyre	University of California, Los Angeles	Writing		
Creative Arts	Theatre Arts	Samuel Selden	University of North Carolina	Basic design in the directing of plays		
Humanities	American Literature	Joseph Leon Edel	Havas	Edition of Henry James' unpublished plays	Also won in 1936, 1965	
Humanities	Architecture, Planning and Design	Lewis Mumford		Completion of a book on Form by the addition of material obtained firsthand in Europe	Also won in 1932, 1956	
Humanities	Classics	Faith Thompson	University of Minnesota	Constitutional history		
Humanities	Classics	Virginia Randolph Grace		Dates and places of manufacture of earthware jars in the Mediterranean basin during the period of classical antiquity as the basis for a history of the commerce of the region during that period	Also won in 1953	
Humanities	Fine Arts Research	Marvin Chauncey Ross	Walters Art Museum	Byzantine enamels	Also won in 1939, 1948, 1952	
Humanities	Fine Arts Research	Carl Schuster	Pennsylvania Museum of Art	Chinese folk art	Also won in 1937	
Humanities	General Nonfiction	Josef Berger	Federal Writers' Project	Tall tales of Portuguese fishermen in Gloucester and other New England ports	Also won in 1946. Pseudonym: Digges, Jeremiah.	
Humanities	German and East European History	O. Fritiof Ander	Augustana College	History of Sweden since 1815	Also won in 1939	
Humanities	Literary Criticism	Richard Palmer Blackmur		Life and works of Henry Adams	Also won in 1937	
Humanities	Literary Criticism	Mary M. Colum		Ideas that have made modern literature	Also won in 1930	
Humanities	Linguistics	Peter Alexis Boodberg	University of California, Berkeley	Reconstruction of archaic Chinese and studies of cultural interactions between China and Central Asia	Also won in 1955, 1963	
Humanities	Linguistics	Allen Walker Read	University of Chicago	Dictionary of "Briticisms"	Also won in 1939	
Humanities	Medieval Literature	Jacob Hammer	Hunter College	Definite text of Geoffrey of Monmouth's history of Britain	Also won in 1929, 1931	
Humanities	Medieval Literature	Frederick M. Salter	Northeast Experimental Junior College	Edition of the Chester Craft Plays and a monograph of its history		
Humanities	United States History	Foster Rhea Dulles		Recreational activities in America from the colonial period until modern times, with an interpretation of changing trends in popular use of leisure time		
Humanities	United States History	Walter Prescott Webb	University of Texas	Relationship between democratic government and an open frontier	Also won in 1954	
Natural Science	Earth Science	Maurice Ewing	Lehigh University	Geophysical investigations of oceanic basins by gravitational and seismic methods	Also won in 1953, 1955	
Natural Science	Earth Science	Earl Hamlet Myers	Scripps Institution of Oceanography	Life cycles of Foraminifera, with special reference to the role of these organisms in the sea and their significance in geological formations	Also won in 1939	
Natural Science	Earth Science	Adolf Pabst	University of California, Berkeley	Orientation of minerals in granitic rock; silicate crystal structure		
Natural Science	Mathematics	D. H. Lehmer	Lehigh University	Analytic theory of numbers, especially in connection with the arithmetical theory of elliptic modular functions		
Natural Science	Medicine and Health	Henry N. Harkins		Surgical and trauma shock, particularly as seen in burns	Also won in 1939, 1965	
Natural Science	Molecular and Cellular Biology	Alfred George Marshak	New England Deaconess Hospital	Mechanism of chromosome division	Also won in 1939	
Natural Science	Molecular and Cellular Biology	Emil L. Smith	Columbia University	Chlorophyll-protein complex	Also won in 1939	
Natural Science	Organismic Biology & Ecology	Myron Gordon		Analysis of the evolutionary process in the development of Mexican platyfish	Also won in 1940	
Natural Science	Organismic Biology & Ecology	Clyde E. Keeler	Harvard Medical School	Book on genetics in relation to medicine		
Natural Science	Organismic Biology & Ecology	Arthur Loveridge	Harvard University	Ecological studies on the vanishing vertebrate fauna of the tropical rainforest remnants in East Africa	Also won in 1933	
Natural Science	Organismic Biology & Ecology	Colin Campbell Sanborn	Field Museum	Taxonomic revision of six families of bats		
Natural Science	Organismic Biology & Ecology	Jack Henry Sandground	Harvard University Medical School	Comparative parasitology, chiefly in the Dutch East Indies		
Natural Science	Physics	Tom Wilkerson Bonner	Rice Institute	Nuclear physics		
Natural Science	Physics	Samuel Abraham Goudsmit	University of Michigan	Recent developments of the theory of nuclear structure		
Natural Science	Plant Science	Alden Springer Crafts	University of California, Davis	Anatomical and physiological study of plants	Also won in 1957	
Natural Science	Plant Science	Philip Alexander Munz	Pomona College	Onagraceae in South America		
Social Sciences	Anthropology and Cultural Studies	Sherburne Friend Cook	University of California, Berkeley	Biological influence of the influx of Western European civilization on the indigenous population of Spanish America	Also won in 1947	
Social Sciences	Anthropology and Cultural Studies	Alfred Métraux	University of California, Bishop Museum	Gran Chaco aboriginal population	Also won in 1940	
Social Sciences	Political Science	Lloyd K. Garrison	University of Wisconsin School of Law	British labor legislation		
Social Sciences	Political Science	Charles Rumford Walker		Influence of radical political movements in the U.S. since 1917		

== 1938 Latin American and Caribbean Fellows ==
Category	Field of Study	Fellow	Institutional association	Research topic	Notes	Ref
Creative Arts	Fine Arts	Leopoldo Méndez				
Creative Arts	Fine Arts	Daniel Serra Badué			Also won in 1939	
Creative Arts	Music Composition	Carlos Chávez		Composition	Also won in 1956	
Natural Sciences	Mathematics	Carlos Graef Fernández	Universidad Nacional Autónoma de México	Theory of probability and mathematical theory of statistics	Also won in 1937, 1939	
Natural Sciences	Medicine and Health	Joaquín Maass y Patiño	Juárez Hospital	Clinical studies in neurosurgery		
Natural Sciences	Molecular and Cellular Biology	Conrado Federico Asenjo	University of Puerto Rico	Systematic study of the chemical composition and active principles of the medicinal and poisonous plants of the West Indies	Also won in 1937, 1954	
Natural Sciences	Organismic Biology & Ecology	Pedro Martínez-Esteve	Universidad Nacional de Córdoba	Physiology of reproduction		
Natural Sciences	Plant Science	Carlos Muñoz Pizarro	Universidad de Chile	Systematic botany, with special relations to native Chilean forage plants	Also won in 1939	
Social Sciences	Anthropology and Cultural Studies	Carlos García Robiou	Universidad de La Habana	Cuban prehistory	Also won in 1937	

== See also ==
- Guggenheim Fellowship
- List of Guggenheim Fellowships awarded in 1937
- List of Guggenheim Fellowships awarded in 1939
