= Rita López de Llergo y Seoane =

Mexican geographer (1905–1979)

- Born: 26 August 1905; Mexico City, Mexico
- Died: c. 1979
- Other name: Rita López de Llergo
- Occupation: Geographer
- Known for: First woman director of a UNAM research institute

Rita López de Llergo y Seoane (Mexico City, 26 August 1905–around 1979) was a Mexican scientist and geographer. She was the first woman to preside over a research institute, the Institute of Geography, at the National Autonomous University of Mexico (UNAM), in 1943.

== Biography ==
López de Llergo studied for her bachelor's degree in physical-mathematical sciences at the National School of Teachers, graduating in 1922, and her master's degree in Geography at the Faculty of Philosophy and Letters, obtaining the academic degree in 1928.

She was the only woman to take the "History of Mathematics" course in that school taught by Sotero Prieto, which was attended by other notable scientists such as Carlos Graef Fernández, among others. She obtained a master's degree in mathematical sciences at the UNAM Faculty of Sciences and a career as vice consul at the Faculty of Law and the Ministry of Foreign Affairs in 1935. In the 1930s, she joined the university's staff of the Institute of Geography.

In 1943 she was appointed by Alfonso Caso as director of the Institute of Geography of the UNAM, becoming the first woman in the history of that university to be the director of a research institute. In this activity, she intensely promoted the cartography of Mexico, considering projects such as the formation of the Coordinating Committee for the lifting of the Charter of the Mexican Republic as well as the promotion of scientific advances in investigative work such as aerial photogrammetry and the donation of photogrammetric devices and collections of aerial photographs of the institute. She was a member of the Special Charts Committee of the Pan American Commission on Cartography, and she was a member of the Pan American Institute of Geography and History.

López de Llergo spent 21 years as the head of the institute, ending her term in 1964.
