= List of Guggenheim Fellowships awarded in 1936 =

Sixty Guggenheim Fellowships were awarded in 1936, bringing the total number of recipients to 525. The Guggenheim family donated an additional $1,000,000 to the Foundation, increasing the scholarship pool to $6,000,000.

== 1936 U.S. and Canadian Fellows ==
Category	Field of Study	Fellow	Institutional association	Research topic	Notes	Ref
Creative Arts	Drama and Performance Art	Leopold Atlas		Playwriting		
Creative Arts	Drama and Performance Art	Albert Bein		Playwriting		
Creative Arts	Drama and Performance Art	Robert Turney		Playwriting	Also won in 1937	
Creative Arts	Fiction	James Thomas Farrell	University of Chicago	Writing		
Creative Arts	Fiction	Josephine Herbst		Writing		
Creative Arts	Fine Arts	Peter Blume		Painting	Also won in 1932	
Creative Arts	Fine Arts	Aaron Bohrod		Painting	Also won in 1937	
Creative Arts	Fine Arts	Jon Corbino		Painting	Also won in 1937	
Creative Arts	Fine Arts	Peppino Mangravite	Sarah Lawrence College	Painting	Also won in 1932	
Creative Arts	Fine Arts	Doris Rosenthal	New York Public Schools	Graphic images from cultures around the world arranged by subject rather than region	Also won in 1931	
Creative Arts	Fine Arts	Antonio Salemme		Sculpture	Also won in 1932	
Creative Arts	Fine Arts	Harry Sternberg		Dangers of the working and living environments of coal and steel workers		
Creative Arts	Fine Arts	Carl Walters		Sculpture	Also won in 1935	
Creative Arts	Music Composition	Dante Fiorillo		Composition	Also won in 1935, 1937, 1938	
Creative Arts	Poetry	Edward Doro		Writing		
Creative Arts	Poetry	Kenneth Flexner Fearing		Writing		
Creative Arts	Poetry	Jacob Hauser		Writing		
Creative Arts	Poetry	Kenneth Patchen		Writing		
Creative Arts	Poetry	Isidor Schneider		Writing	Also won in 1934	
Humanities	American Literature	Joseph Leon Edel	Havas News Agency	Volume of unpublished plays	Also won in 1938, 1965	
Humanities	American Literature	Morris Roberts		Reevaluation of Henry James' novels and a study of their literary relations		
Humanities	Architecture, Planning, and Design	Catherine Krouse Bauer	American Federation of Labor	Western European and Soviet housing		
Humanities	Bibliography	Donald Goddard Wing	Yale University	Short-title list, with locations of all books published in Great Britain or in English from 1641 to 1700		
Humanities	Biography	John Edwin Bakeless	Sarah Lawrence College	Christopher Marlowe	Also won in 1945	
Humanities	British History	Garrett Mattingly	Long Island University	Catherine of Aragon with special reference to her influence on English foreign policy, on the development of English humanism, and on the course of the English Reformation under Henry VIII	Also won in 1945, 1953, 1960	
Humanities	Classics	Thomas A. Brady	University of Missouri, Columbia	Egyptian religions		
Humanities	Classics	Charles Farwell Edson, Jr.		History of ancient Macedonia	Also won in 1937, 1956	
Humanities	Economic History	Leland Hamilton Jenks	Wellesley College	Migration of the British capital, 1875-1914		
Humanities	English Literature	Donald Alfred Stauffer	Princeton University	History of English biography and autobiography of the 18th century		
Humanities	French Literature	Jean Paul Misrahi	Columbia University	Critical edition of Chretien de Troyes' Erec and Enide		
Humanities	French Literature	Pierre Robert Vigneron	University of Chicago	Physiological and critical study of the life of Marie Henri Beyle		
Humanities	French History	Leo Gershoy	Long Island University	Reinterpretation of the theories and policies of 18th-century enlightened despotism as a stage in European history	Also won in 1939, 1946, 1959	
Humanities	French History	Donald Malcolm Greer		Biography of Paul Barras		
Humanities	French History	Saul K. Padover	University of California	Life of Louis XVI as a symbol of declining civilization		
Humanities	General Nonfiction	Zora Neale Hurston		Practice of obeah	Also won in 1937	
Humanities	General Nonfiction	Donald Culross Peattie		Robert Owen's New Harmony experiment	Also won in 1937	
Humanities	General Nonfiction	Glanville Wynkoop Smith		History of the West Indies		
Humanities	Literary Criticism	Granville Hicks		Interpretation of English literature since 1890 with reference to the influence of social change upon literature		
Humanities	Medieval Literature	John Webster Spargo	Northwestern University	English law and literature of the Middle Ages and the Renaissance	Also won in 1930	
Humanities	Music Research	Ralph Leonard Kirkpatrick		17th- and 18th-century chamber music		
Humanities	Spanish and Portuguese Literature	Irving A. Leonard	University of California	Cultural and intellectual history of Colonial Spanish America		
Humanities	United States History	Perry Gilbert Eddy Miller	Harvard University	Intellectual history of New England to the middle of the 18th century		
Humanities	United States History	Ernest Staples Osgood	University of Minnesota	History of Montana		
Natural Science	Chemistry	George Willard Wheland	California Institute of Technology	Organic molecules		
Natural Science	Mathematics	Solomon Gandz				
Natural Science	Mathematics	Marshall Harvey Stone	Harvard University	Theory of linear representation in abstract spaces		
Natural Science	Molecular and Cellular Biology	James Thomas Culbertson	Columbia University	Humoral and cellular immunological phenomena in the mechanism underlying the immunity against parasitic diseases, particularly the protozoan and helminthic infestations of man	Also won in 1946	
Natural Science	Molecular and Cellular Biology	Michael Heidelberger	Columbia University		Also won in 1934	
Natural Science	Molecular and Cellular Biology	Morris Moore	Barnard Free Skin and Cancer Hospital	Disease-producing fungi of North and South America	Also won in 1935	
Natural Science	Molecular and Cellular Biology	Lloyd Raymond Watson	Alfred University	Honey bees		
Natural Science	Molecular and Cellular Biology	Perry William Wilson	University of Wisconsin	Bacterial fixation of nitrogen (with Marjory Stephenson)		
Natural Science	Organismic Biology and Ecology	Harold Francis Blum	University of California	Biological photo-sensitization	Also won in 1945, 1953	
Natural Science	Organismic Biology and Ecology	George Whitfield Deluz Hamlett	United States Biological Survey	Embryology and the reproductive cycles of various South American mammals	Also won in 1937	
Social Sciences	Economics	Abram Lincoln Harris		Institutional economics	Also won in 1935, 1943, 1953	
Social Sciences	Law	Alexander Nahum Sack	New York University	Business taxation		
Social Sciences	Political Science	Lennox Algernon Mills	University of Minnesota	Postwar politics and other conditions in Hong Kong, the Straits Settlements and Malay States	Also won in 1957, 1959	
Social Sciences	Psychology	Donald McLean Purdy	University of Maine	European functional psychology		
Social Sciences	Sociology	Clifford Kirkpatrick	University of Minnesota	Psychological adjustment of German and Austrian women		

== 1936 Latin American and Caribbean Fellows ==
Category	Field of Study	Fellow	Institutional association	Research topic	Notes	Ref
Humanities	Iberian and Latin American History	Andrés Henestrosa	National University of Mexico	Significance of Zapotecan culture	Also won in 1937	
Natural Science	Earth Science	Pedro J. Bermúdez Hernández			Also won in 1935	
Natural Science	Medicine and Health	Enrique Savino			Also won in 1935, 1937	
Natural Science	Medicine and Health	Adalberto Steeger Schaeffer	Hospital Manuel Arriarán	Infectious diseases especially as related to pediatrics		
Natural Science	Physics	Alfredo Baños, Jr.	Universidad Nacional Autónoma de México	Physical nature of dielectric constant and the conductivity of dielectrics	Also won in 1935, 1937, 1957	

== See also ==
- Guggenheim Fellowship
- List of Guggenheim Fellowships awarded in 1935
- List of Guggenheim Fellowships awarded in 1937
