= Mary Barnett Gilson =

American economist (1877–1969)

Member of the National War Labor Board
- In office 1942–1943

Personal details
- Born: September 10, 1877 Uniontown, Pennsylvania, U.S.
- Died: March 10, 1969 (aged 91) Chapel Hill, North Carolina, U.S.
- Education: Wellesley College; Columbia University
- Occupation: Economist; business executive
- Awards: Guggenheim Fellowship (1939)

Mary Barnett Gilson (September 10, 1877 – March 10, 1969) was an American economist, business executive, and government official. As the manager of Clothcraft Shops' service programs, She and her boss Richard A. Feiss considered scientific management beneficial for employee retention, implementing it in the workplace and employees' homes. After doing academic research, including a master's degree at Columbia University, she wrote Unemployment Insurance in Great Britain (1931) and What's Past Is Prologue (1940), became an economics professor at the University of Chicago, and worked as a special mediation representative for the National War Labor Board.

== Biography ==
Mary Barnett Gilson was born on September 10, 1877, at Uniontown, Pennsylvania, daughter of Agnes (née Pollock) and religious newspaper editor Samuel S. Gilson. She was educated at Wellesley College, where she got her Bachelor of Arts degree in 1899; that year, she got her first professional job, working at a Pittsburgh public library. She joined the Women's Educational and Industrial Union's department store worker training program in 1910, and did research on saleswomen employment by working at department stores. After being disillusioned with the "artificiality" of the department store environment, she decided to become a vocational counselor at the Trade School for Girls.

In 1913, she began working at Clothcraft Shops, a garment factory in Cleveland. She and her boss Richard A. Feiss considered scientific management beneficial for employee retention, with Feiss providing her freedom to manage things her own way. Originally starting as welfare secretary, she was granted management of the factory's service programs, improving them in both the factory and the employees' residences; she also encouraged the promotion of the factory's women employees. David J. Goldberg called her "an example of a Progressive era reformer who cast her lot with industry rather than with settlement houses or trade unions", and Sharon Hartman Strom described her as "the most influential and articulate woman advocate of Taylorism". Following the company's financial decline due to the rise of the automobile, which allowed customers to buy locally instead of a factory, she resigned in 1924.

From 1925 to 1926, she did research on working conditions at Hawaiian sugar plantations and on unemployment insurance in the United Kingdom, before getting her MA at Columbia University during the latter year. In October 1928, she endorsed Herbert Hoover's successful presidential campaign. She returned to England to do research for her 1931 book Unemployment Insurance in Great Britain. The same year, she became assistant professor of economics at the University of Chicago, working there until her retirement in 1942 as professor emeritus. She published Unemployment Insurance (1932). In 1939, she was awarded a Guggenheim Fellowship. She also chaired the Illinois Minimum Wage Commission for the Laundry Industry and Special Advisory Committee on Unemployment Compensation Administrative Methods for Illinois.

In 1940, she published her memoir What's Past Is Prologue. She worked for the National War Labor Board as a special mediation representative from June 1942 until it was regionalized the next year. She later moved to Chapel Hill afterwards. She obtained her honorary doctor of laws from Russell Sage College in 1945.

Gilson died in Chapel Hill, North Carolina on March 10, 1969. Her papers are at the University of North Carolina Wilmington Center for Southeast North Carolina Archives and History.

== Publications ==
- Unemployment Insurance in Great Britain (1931)
- Unemployment Insurance (1932)
- What's Past Is Prologue (1940)
