= Harold F. Blum =

American physiologist

- Born: February 12, 1899; Escondido, California
- Died: September 29, 1980 (aged 81); Philadelphia, Pennsylvania
- Education: Ph.D. Physiology in 1927 and B.S. Zoology with honors in 1922 from University of California-Berkeley
- Known for: exploring light's effect on cells, especially sunlight-induced skin cancer
- Spouse: Married Mabel Gilham 1930.
- Children: Daughter Janet Susan 1942. Grandchildren Amanda Lewis born 1963. Fritz Lewis born 1966
- Scientific career
- Fields: Physiology and photobiology
- Workplaces: Princeton University, SUNY Albany, University of California-Berkeley, Harvard Medical School, University of Oregon, Naval Medical Research Institute, Temple University School of Medicine

Harold Francis Blum (1899 - 1980) was a physiologist who explored the interaction of light and chemicals on cells, especially sunlight-induced skin cancer.

== Early life and education ==
Harold Blum was born on February 12, 1899, in Escondido, California. For a year during the First World War, he served with the American Expeditionary Forces Signal Corps in France. Blum graduated in 1922 from the University of California, Berkeley, with an A.B. in zoology with honors. He attended Harvard Medical School from 1923 to 1924, then returned to Berkeley for a Ph.D. in physiology and graduated in 1927. During his PhD studies Blum worked for the San Francisco Bay Marine Piling Committee. Blum completed postdoctoral studies at the Laboratoire Maritime de Concarneau in France and the University of Liège in Belgium in 1933.

== Career ==
Harold Blum was an assistant professor of animal biology at the University of Oregon, then an instructor of physiology at Harvard Medical School. He became an assistant professor, then associate professor, of physiology at the University of California at Berkeley. In 1938, Blum was a founding member of the National Cancer Institute. Blum's 1940 book Photodynamic Action and Diseases Due to Light, written during the first of his three Guggenheim Fellowships (awarded in 1936, 1945, and 1953), was a classic text used in medical schools for many years. The book earned the Medal of the University of Liège. From 1943-1946 during the Second World War, he was a principal biophysicist of the Naval Medical Research Institute. In 1947 Blum became visiting professor at Princeton University, where he spent 20 years.

In 1951 Blum published Time's Arrow and Evolution, which "explores the relationship between time's arrow (the second law of thermodynamics) and organic evolution." This influential text studies "irreversibility and direction in evolution and order, negentropy, and evolution." Blum argues that evolution followed specific patterns predetermined by the inorganic nature of the earth and its thermodynamic processes. Scholar Robert Scholes, writing about influences on science fiction, calls the work a "milestone in science writing" that is "one of the finest pieces of science writing ever done."

Blum retired from Princeton University and the US Public Health Service in 1967. After retirement, he was a professor, then professor emeritus, of biology at State University of New York at Albany. From 1973 until his death in 1980, Harold Blum was visiting professor of photobiology at the Center for Photobiology, Skin and Cancer Hospital of the Temple University School of Medicine.

Harold Blum died in Philadelphia, Pennsylvania, on September 29, 1980.
