= Corbino =

Corbino is a surname. Notable people with the surname include:

- Epicarmo Corbino (1890–1984), Italian academic and economist
- Jon Corbino (1905–1964), Italian-born American painter
- Orso Mario Corbino (1876–1937), Italian physicist and politician
