= Helia Bravo Hollis =

Mexican botanist (1901–2001)

- Born: 30 September 1901; Mexico City, Mexico
- Died: 26 September 2001 (aged 99)
- Education: Master of Science, UNAM; Honorary Doctorate, UNAM
- Occupation: Botanist

Helia Bravo Hollis (Spanish pronunciation: [ˈelja ˈbɾaβo 'oles]) (30 September 1901 – 26 September 2001) was a Mexican botanist and a researcher in the Faculty of Science at UNAM.

== Background and studies ==
Helia Bravo Hollis was born and raised in Mixcoac, located in present-day Mexico City. Her interest in the study of living beings came from Sunday walks with her parents. She excelled in school from a young age. President Porfirio Díaz gave her recognition for her grades upon her completion of primary school.

The political turmoil during the Mexican Revolution affected her family. Her father, a loyal supporter of Francisco Madero, was killed in 1914, shortly after Madero's assassination.

Despite the conflicts her family faced, Bravo made progress with her studies and entered high school in 1919, attending Saint Ildefonso (National Preparatory High School), in Mexico City. Her teachers included Vicente Lombardo Toledano, Sotero Prieto, Erasmo Castellano, Antonio Caso, and botanist Isaac Ochoterena, who influenced Bravo's interest in the biological sciences.

After finishing high school, Bravo initially continued her studies in medicine. She faced pressure from her family to become a doctor and biology was not yet available as a major at UNAM. However, when an opportunity to study biology arose a year afterwards she transferred to study at UNAM's College of Sciences. In 1927, she became the first certified biologist in Mexico.

In 1931, Bravo obtained a Master of Science degree in Biological Sciences from the College of Philosophy and Letters of UNAM, with the thesis, "Contribution to the knowledge of the cactus of Tehuacán, Puebla." She later received an honorary doctorate from UNAM in 1985.

Helia Bravo Hollis married Jose Clemente Robles, one of Mexico's first neurosurgeons. They divorced after a decade of marriage without having children. Bravo retired at the age of 90 due to her arthritis. She died on September 26, 2001, only four days before her 100th birthday.

== Contributions to biology ==
Bravo first worked in the field of zoology in the area of parasitic and free-living protozoa, publishing nine studies between 1921 and 1927 alongside Professor Isaac Ochoterena while still a student. She joined the teaching faculty at the National Preparatory School as a teaching assistant, and later as a professor.

She was later invited to head the biology department at UNAM, which changed its name to Biology Institute of UNAM after the university became autonomous in 1929.

In the 1950s, she returned to academic life and was a professor of botany at the National School of Biological Sciences of the Instituto Politécnico Nacional. Two years later she returned to the Biology Institute of UNAM. It was during this period that she shared the leadership of the National Herbarium with Débora Ramírez Cantú.

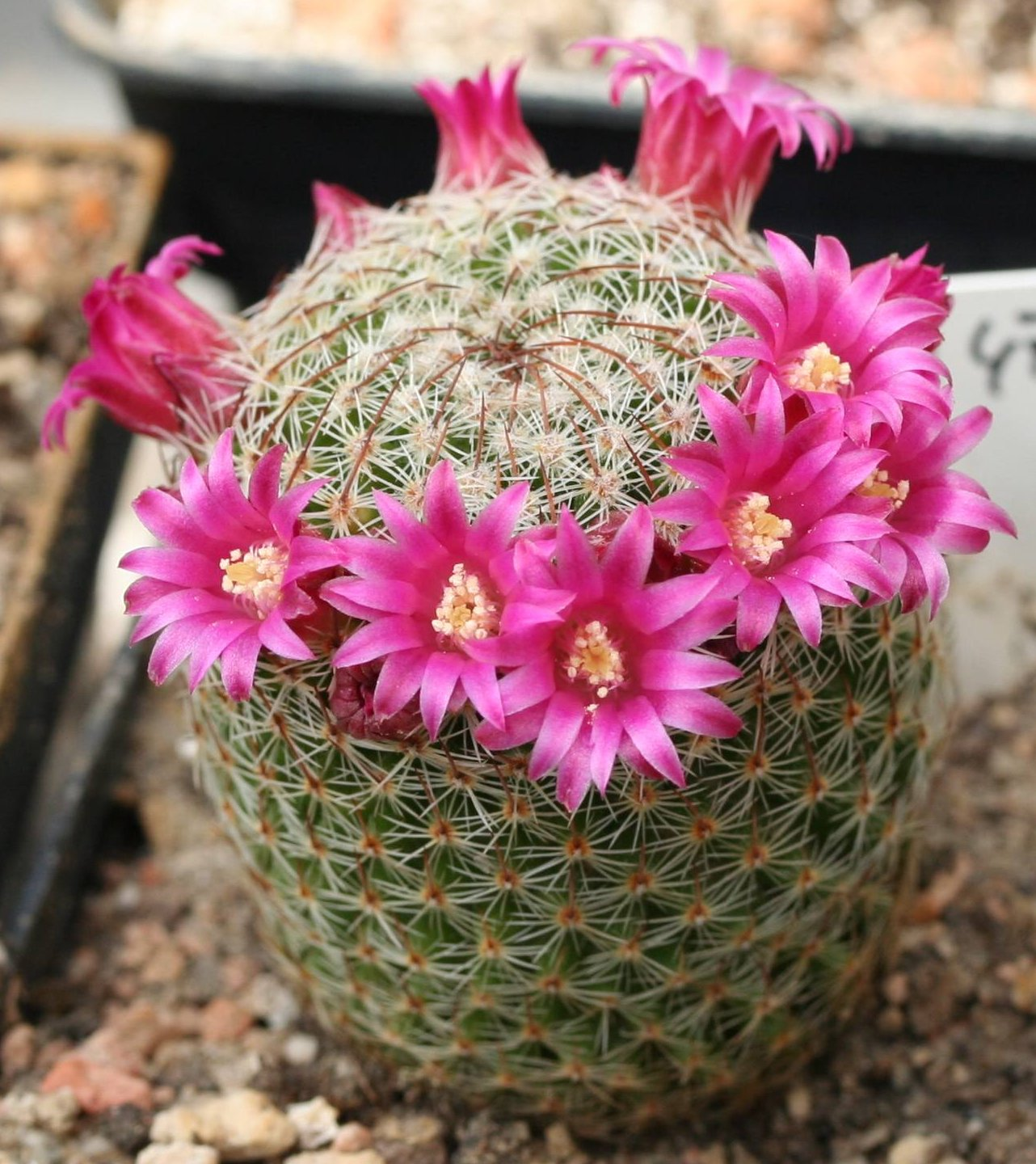
Mammillaria matudae, described by Bravo

Bravo made contributions to the area of floriculture, although in the arid regions of eastern Mexico, she focused on the taxonomy of cactaceae. She organized a collection of live cactaceae and other succulent plants in order to observe their development and evaluate their morphological characteristics.

She co-founded the Mexican Cactus Society (Sociedad Mexicana de Cactología) in 1951 with Carlos Chávez, Dudley Blackburn Gold, Jorge Meyrán, Eizi Matuda, and Hernando Sanchez-Mejorada, and later helped to found the Botanical Gardens at UNAM in 1959, then served as its director in the 1960s. The Society published the magazine Cactáceas y suculentas mexicanas under the leadership of Jorge Meyrán. She specialized in the taxonomy of cactacea in Mexico, authoring an entire monograph on the Mesoamerican region. She conducted fieldwork and worked in herbariums, disseminating her findings in publications, conferences, and in the classroom.

Bravo's scientific writings span over 160 publications, 60 taxonomy descriptions, and 59 reclassifications. She published her first work in Revista Mexicana de Biologia in 1921. Bravo published her first book in 1937. Her best-recognized work, Las Cactaceas de Mexico, was published in 1937. The work was written in Spanish and was over 700 pages in length. Bravo collaborated with Hernando Sanchez-Mejorada to update the book from 1978 to 1991. The work was then 3 volumes and had over 1,800 pages. Many of Bravo's articles were published in Cactaceasy Suculentas Mexicanas, the journal of the Mexican Cactus Society.

== Honors ==
Bravo received several distinctions as well as national and international recognitions. She received the Cactus d'Or Award from the International Organization for Succulent Plant Study (IOS) in 1980. The Cactus and Succulent Society of America (CSSA) gave her a fellow award in 1941 for "Las Cactaceas de Mexico" and other publications. The last award she received was for her work regarding the flora of Metztitlán, Hidalgo, during the creation of a biosphere reserve there in 2000.

The Helia Bravo Hollis Botanical Garden in Puebla, Mexico was named after her and is home to many endangered cactus species. UNAM named the desert section of the Jardin Botánico after her: Jardin del Desierto Helia Bravo.

=== Eponymy ===
Nine taxa of the flora and fauna of Mexico have been appointed in her honor, including:

- (Cactaceae) Heliabravoa Backeb. -- Cact. Succ.

One genus, Heliabravoa, was named in Helia's honor by Curt Backeberg (1894–1966) in 1956; however, this genus later became a synonym of Polaskia that was described by C Backeberg in 1949. Helia is credited with describing two genera, Backebergia in 1953 and Pseudomitrocereus (w Franz Buxbaum (1900–1979)) in 1961; however, both became synonyms of Pachycereus.

== Tribute ==
On 30 September 2018, Google commemorated Helia Bravo Hollis with a Google Doodle.
