= Walter Sharp =

Walter Sharp may refer to:

- Walter L. Sharp (born 1952), U.S. Army General
- Walter Benona Sharp (1870–1912), American oilman
- Walter Rice Sharp (1896–1977), American political scientist

== See also ==
- Walter Sharpe (born 1986), American basketball player
