= List of Guggenheim Fellowships awarded in 1940 =

Seventy-three Guggenheim Fellowships were awarded in 1940. A total of $165,000 was disbursed.

== 1940 U.S. and Canadian Fellows ==
| Category | Field of Study | Fellow | Institutional association | Research topic | Notes | Ref |
|---|---|---|---|---|---|---|
| Creative Arts | Fiction | Hermann J. Broch | Princeton University (visiting) | The Death of Virgil | Also won in 1941 | |
| Creative Arts | Fiction | Ward Allison Dorrance | University of Missouri | Writing | | |
| Creative Arts | Fiction | Edwin Moultrie Lanham | Herald Tribune | Novel about the Southwest | | |
| Creative Arts | Fiction | Andrew Nelson Lytle | | Writing | Also won in 1941, 1959 | |
| Creative Arts | Fiction | Christine Weston | | Writing | | |
| Creative Arts | Fine Arts | Bernard Arnest | Broadmoor Academy | Painting | | |
| Creative Arts | Fine Arts | Lawrence Louis Barrett | | | | |
| Creative Arts | Fine Arts | Richmond Barthé | | Sculpture: Memorial to James Weldon Johnson | Also won in 1941 | |
| Creative Arts | Fine Arts | Miguel Covarrubias | | Book preparation | Also won in 1933 | |
| Creative Arts | Fine Arts | John Hovannes | | Sculpture | | |
| Creative Arts | Fine Arts | Henry Lee McFee | | Painting | | |
| Creative Arts | Fine Arts | Elizabeth Tracy | | Painting | | |
| Creative Arts | Fine Arts | Herman Palmer | | Graphic arts: Wild and domesticated animals | | |
| Creative Arts | Fine Arts | Ruth Reeves | | Living materials for modern textile designs | Also won in 1941 | |
| Creative Arts | Fine Arts | Carl Schaefer | | Painting: Life of an American farmer | | |
| Creative Arts | Fine Arts | Harry Wickey | | Sculpture | Also won in 1939 | |
| Creative Arts | Music Composition | Marc Blitzstein | | Musical stage composition | Also won in 1941 | |
| Creative Arts | Music Composition | Alvin Etler | Indianapolis Symphony Orchestra | Composition | Also won in 1941, 1963 | |
| Creative Arts | Music Composition | Earl Robinson | | Full-length ballad-operetta based on The People, Yes | Also won in 1941 | |
| Creative Arts | Music Composition | William Howard Schuman | Sarah Lawrence College | Composition | Also won 1939 | |
| Creative Arts | Photography | Walker Evans | | New York subway portraits | Also won in 1941, 1959 | |
| Creative Arts | Photography | Edward Weston | | California | Also won in 1939 | |
| Creative Arts | Poetry | Lloyd Frankenberg | | Writing | | |
| Creative Arts | Poetry | Delmore Schwartz | | Writing | Also won in 1941 | |
| Creative Arts | Theatre Arts | Howard Bay | | Scenic design | | |
| Humanities | American Literature | Alfred Kazin | New York Herald Tribune | 20th-century American prose | Also won in 1947, 1958, 1969 | |
| Humanities | Architecture, Planning, and Design | Gregory Ain | | Development of low-cost housing | | |
| Humanities | Biography | Richmond C. Beatty | Vanderbilt University | James Russell Lowell | | |
| Humanities | Fine Arts Research | Robert Chester Smith | Library of Congress | Preparation of a history of the fine arts in Brazil from pre-Columbian times to present | | |
| Humanities | Fine Arts Research | Carl Zigrosser | Weyhe Gallery | Art research | Also won in 1939 | |
| Humanities | General Nonfiction | John Dos Passos | | Essays on the basis of the present American conceptions of freedom of thought | Also won in 1939, 1942 | |
| Humanities | German and East European History | Lewis Galantière | | Treatise on the character of the German people | | |
| Humanities | Intellectual and Cultural History | Hans Kohn | Smith College | History of nationalism | | |
| Humanities | Medieval Literature | Louis Furman Sas | City College of New York | Origins of Romance languages | | |
| Humanities | Near Eastern Studies | Richard F. S. Starr | Hope House | Art of the ancient Near East | | |
| Humanities | Philosophy | Otis Hamilton Lee | Vassar College | Nature of philosophic inquiry | | |
| Humanities | Philosophy | Paul Marhenke | University of California, Berkeley | Treatise on the sensational and perceptual basis of knowledge in the nature of a critique of the subjectivistic premise of the modern theories of knowledge | | |
| Humanities | United States History | Howard Wolf | Cleveland News | History of American press associations | Also won in 1939 | |
| Natural Sciences | Chemistry | Arthur C. Cope | Bryn Mawr College | Tautomerism and the chemistry of tautomeric systems | | |
| Natural Sciences | Chemistry | Aristid von Grosse | | Catalytic reactions of organic compounds and investigations of the products of neutron bombardment of uranium, protactinium, and thorium | Also won in 1941 | |
| Natural Sciences | Geography and Environmental Studies | Raymond E. Crist | University of Illinois Urbana-Champaign | Human geography of the Venezuelan Andes | Also won in 1953 | |
| Natural Sciences | Earth Science | Chester Stock | Natural History Museum of Los Angeles County, California Institute of Technology | Vertebrate paleontological reconnaissance of Mexico | Also won in 1939 | |
| Natural Sciences | Earth Science | Harold Ernest Vokes | American Museum of Natural History | Fossil remains of spineless animals in Lebanon | | |
| Natural Sciences | Mathematics | Jesse Douglas | | | Also won in 1941 | |
| Natural Sciences | Mathematics | Gordon Pall | McGill University | Arithmetical properties of quadratic forms | | |
| Natural Sciences | Mathematics | Raymond Louis Wilder | University of Michigan | Topology, particularly in the theory of locally connected spaces and of general manifolds | | |
| Natural Sciences | Mathematics | Aurel Friedrich Wintner | Johns Hopkins University | Mathematical theory of probability and statistics | | |
| Natural Sciences | Molecular and Cellular Biology | David Lion Drabkin | Perelman School of Medicine | Biological oxidation-reduction processes | | |
| Natural Sciences | Molecular and Cellular Biology | John T. Edsall | Harvard Medical School | Physical chemistry of amino acids, peptides, proteins and related compounds | Also won in 1953 | |
| Natural Sciences | Molecular and Cellular Biology | Raymund Lull Zwemer | Columbia University College of Physicians and Surgeons | Factors involved in the maintenance, by living cells, of a differential permeability to electrolytes | | |
| Natural Sciences | Neuroscience | Berry Campbell | University of Oklahoma | Research at Yale University | Also won in 1941 | |
| Natural Sciences | Organismic Biology & Ecology | Myron Gordon | | | Also won in 1938 | |
| Natural Sciences | Organismic Biology & Ecology | Gregory Pincus | Clark University | Zoological investigations | Also won in 1939 | |
| Natural Sciences | Physics | David Mathias Dennison | University of Michigan | Molecular structure | | |
| Natural Sciences | Plant Science | Stanley A. Cain | University of Tennessee | Concepts and methods of geobotany | | |
| Natural Sciences | Plant Science | Katherine Esau | University of California, Davis | Anatomy and physiology of vascular plants | | |
| Natural Sciences | Plant Science | George Thomas Johnson | Washington University in St. Louis | Biologic and taxonomic sudy of tropical American lichens | Also won in 1941 | |
| Natural Sciences | Plant Science | Franklin P. Metcalf | Lingnan University | Monograph on the flora of Fukien Province | | |
| Natural Sciences | Plant Science | Henry K. Svenson | Brooklyn Botanic Garden | Plant evolution | | |
| Social Sciences | Anthropology and Cultural Studies | Luther S. Cressman | University of Oregon | Indian culture of the Southwestern United States, compared with the culture of ancient Indian races of south-central Oregon | Also won in 1949 | |
| Social Sciences | Anthropology and Cultural Studies | Alfred Irving Hallowell | University of Pennsylvania | Personality in primitive communities | | |
| Social Sciences | Anthropology and Cultural Studies | Isabel Truesdell Kelly | University of California, Berkeley | Ethnographic and archeological investigations in southwestern Mexico | Also won in 1941 | |
| Social Sciences | Anthropology and Cultural Studies | Alfred Métraux | | | Also won in 1938 | |
| Social Sciences | Economics | Wassily W. Leontief | Harvard University | Mathematical economics | Also won in 1950 | |
| Social Sciences | Economics | James Ackley Maxwell | Clark University | Impact of federalism upon federal and state finance in the United States | | |
| Social Sciences | Economics | Nathan Reich | Hunter College | Relationship between political democracy and economic organization | | |
| Social Sciences | Economics | Frank A. Southard Jr. | Cornell University | Foreign exchange policies of several Latin American countries | | |
| Social Sciences | Law | Percy Elwood Corbett | McGill University | "The community of states and its law" | | |
| Social Sciences | Political Science | Donald Grant Creighton | University of Toronto | Development of Canadian nationality, 1850-present | | |
| Social Sciences | Political Science | Warren Aldrich Roberts | Cleveland College of Art and Design | Mine taxation in the United States | | |
| Social Sciences | Political Science | Francis Reginald Scott | McGill University | Nature and development of the Canadian constitution | | |
| Social Sciences | Psychology | George Katona | | Psychology of learning, with special reference to the differences in learning by understanding and learning by memorization and drill | Also won in 1941 | |
| Social Sciences | Sociology | Edward Franklin Frazier | Howard University | Comparative study of the Negro family in the West Indies and Brazil | | |

== 1940 Latin American and Caribbean Fellows ==
| Category | Field of Study | Fellow | Institutional association | Research topic | Notes | Ref |
|---|---|---|---|---|---|---|
| Humanities | Linguistics | J. Eugene Garro | Archaeological Museum of Ancash | Native languages of Peru | | |
| Natural Sciences | Earth Science | Nabor Carrillo | National Autonomous University of Mexico | Soil mechanics in its application to the construction of foundations of buildings and dams | Also won in 1941 | |
| Natural Sciences | Earth Science | Carlos Nicholson Jefferson | National University of San Agustín | Comparative studies of the climates of the Peruvian and Californian coasts | | |
| Natural Sciences | Medicine and Health | Hugo Pablo Chiodi | University of Buenos Aires | Respiratory phenomena caused by muscular activity in health and disease | Also won in 1939 | |
| Natural Sciences | Medicine and Health | Eduardo Etzel | Clemente Ferreira Tuberculosis Institute | Technical studies of thoracic surgery in relation to the treatment of pulmonary tuberculosis | | |
| Natural Sciences | Medicine and Health | Raúl Palacios von Helms | Bacteriological Institute of Chile | Rabies | Also won in 1939 | |
| Natural Sciences | Medicine and Health | Nilson Torres de Rezende | | Neurophysiology | Also won in 1941 | |
| Natural Sciences | Molecular and Cellular Biology | Américo S. Albrieux Murdoch | Institute of Endocrinology, Montevideo | Hormone therapy | Also won in 1941 | |
| Natural Sciences | Molecular and Cellular Biology | Fernando G. Huidobro Toro | Pontifical Catholic University of Chile | Chemical transmission of nerve impulses | | |
| Natural Sciences | Molecular and Cellular Biology | Ciro A. Peluffo | Institute of Hygiene, Montevideo | Artificially induced microbiological variation | | |
| Natural Sciences | Molecular and Cellular Biology | Maurício Rocha e Silva | Biological Institute | Pharmacological properties of trypsin | Also won in 1941 | |
| Natural Sciences | Physics | Mário Schenberg | University of São Paulo | Application of nuclear and atomic physics to astrophysics | Also won in 1941 | |
| Natural Sciences | Physics | Facundo Bueso Sanllehí | University of Puerto Rico | Band spectra | Also won in 1941 | |
| Natural Sciences | Plant Science | Carlos Arnaldo Krug | Instituto Agronômico de Campinas | Genetic investigations of citrus and other major crop plants of Brazil | | |
| Natural Sciences | Plant Science | José Pérez Carabia | La Salle College | Flora of Cuba | | |
| Social Sciences | Anthropology and Cultural Studies | Jorge C. Muelle | Museo de la Nación | | | |
| Social Sciences | Anthropology and Cultural Studies | Arthur Ramos de Araujo Pereira | Federal University of Rio de Janeiro | Cultural anthropology | | |
| Social Sciences | Economics | Jorge Kingston | | | Also won in 1947 | |
| Social Sciences | Political Science | Santos Primo Amadeo | University of Puerto Rico | Comparative study of constitutional law in Argentina and the United States | Also won in 1941 | |

== See also ==
- Guggenheim Fellowship
- List of Guggenheim Fellowships awarded in 1939
- List of Guggenheim Fellowships awarded in 1941
