= Tracy Montminy =

American artist (1911–1992)

- ca. 1940
- Born: Elizabeth Tracy; June 5, 1911; Boston, Massachusetts
- Died: June 4, 1992 (aged 80); Columbia, Missouri
- Resting place: Columbia Cemetery
- Other names: “Ibby” Montminy, Mrs. Pierre Montminy
- Education: Fine Arts with honors from Radcliffe College and Art Students League of New York
- Alma mater: Radcliffe College
- Occupations: Artist, muralist, art professor
- Employer: University of Missouri (Art Department),
- Known for: Montminy Art Gallery
- Notable work: WPA murals
- Style: Social Realism, Abstract Expressionism
- Spouse: Pierre Montminy
- Awards: Guggenheim Fellowship (Painting, 1940)

Tracy Montminy, who completed early works as Elizabeth Tracy, (1911–1992) was an American artist and muralist. During the Works Progress Administration era, she painted murals in civic buildings, including the library in Cambridge, Massachusetts; the fire and police building of Saugus, Massachusetts; the post office of Milton, Massachusetts; the city hall of Medford, Massachusetts; the post office of Downers Grove, Illinois; and the post office of Kennebunkport, Maine, as well as others both in the U.S. and abroad. She was an art instructor at the University of Missouri and the American University of Beirut, continuing her own painting projects simultaneously with her teaching into the 1980s. Upon her death, she established a trust to create the Montminy Art Gallery in Columbia, Missouri.

== Early life ==
Elizabeth Tracy was born on June 5, 1911, in Boston, Massachusetts. She began painting and drawing images for stories as a child and initially wanted to illustrate fashion designs. Her early education was in Cambridge, Massachusetts, and her studies continued at Radcliffe College. Graduating with honors in Fine Arts in 1933, Tracy studied with the Italian painter Rico Lebrun at the Art Students League of New York between 1934 and 1935.

== Career ==
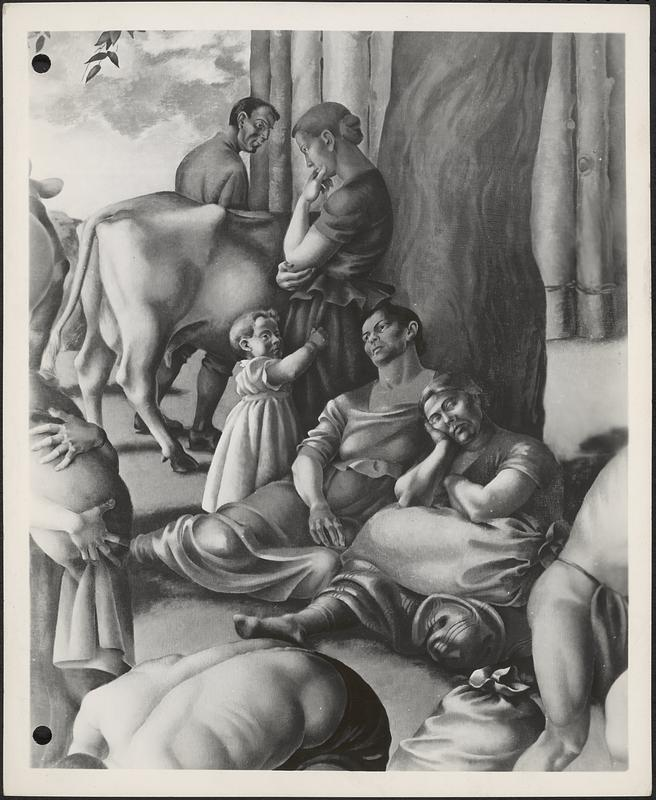
Sketch for Saugus police station, 1935-1943. The Massachusetts WPA Federal Art Project Photograph Collection, Boston Public Library

In 1934, Tracy began working for the Works Progress Administration (WPA) through the Section of Painting and Sculpture (later called the Section of Fine Arts). Murals in public buildings were intended to boost the morale of the American people from the effects of the Depression by depicting uplifting subjects. Murals were commissioned through competitions open to all artists in the United States. She initially worked as an assistant to other artists, working on the murals in the public library in Cambridge, Massachusetts. The Cambridge library project included four murals, which Tracy completed with Arthur Willis Oakman. Tracy's first solo commission was a mural for the fire and police building of Saugus, Massachusetts. She began work on The Founding of Saugus in 1935 in the courthouse of the police station. The mural depicted the early meeting of Native Americans and the English settlers who founded the town. When the police station was demolished, the mural was moved to the auditorium of the Saugus Town Hall.

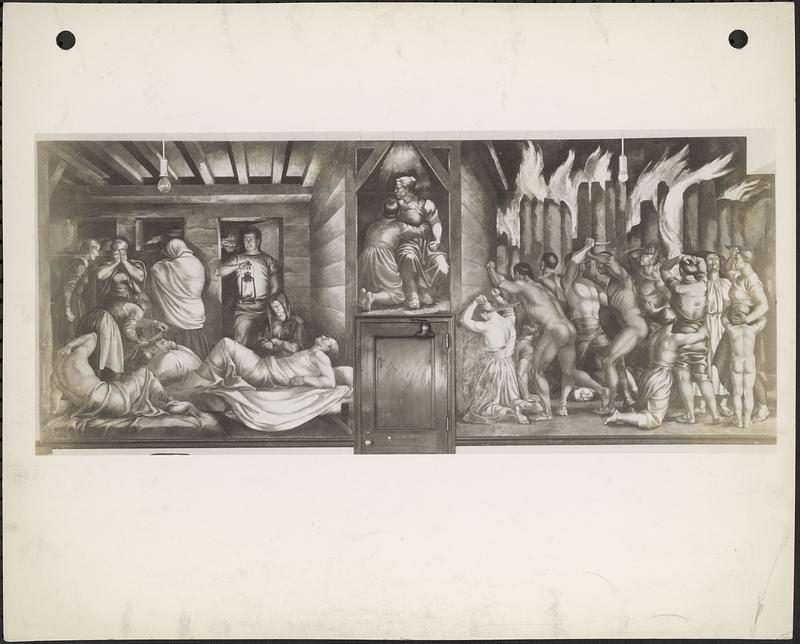
Terrors of the wilderness, 1935-1943. The Massachusetts WPA Federal Art Project Photograph Collection, Boston Public Library

After completion of the Saugus mural, it is likely that she completed the mural for the Salinas y Rocha y Cia department store in Mexico City, since it was completed prior to her application for the Guggenheim Fellowship in 1939. Tracy was selected to paint the mural for the Milton, Massachusetts, post office. The painting, The Suffolk Resolves: Oppression and Revolt in the Colonies adorns a wall in the office of the post service manager. Completed in 1938, it was restored by a conservator from Chicago in 2010, after storm damage to the post office. Following the project in Milton, Tracy began work on a mural at the Medford City Hall in Medford, Massachusetts. Her mural, located on the second floor in what is now the solicitor's office, was called Terror of the Wilderness. The mural's theme depicts the trials colonists faced with images on the left representing plague victims and on the right showing nude natives attacking settlers. Completed in 1939, the nudity caused controversy when unveiled and it was discussed whether it should be painted over or preserved. After completion of the mural, Tracy was awarded a Guggenheim Fellowship to run from September 1, 1940 for one year.

Tracy's next project was Chicago: Railroad Centre of the Nation in the post office of Downers Grove, Illinois. The work is large, 6 feet x 13 feet and illustrates workers constructing the railroads and preparing to load mail onto boxcars at the train station. It was completed in 1940 and was designated by the Downers Grove Historical Society as a historical site in 2004. After completing the Illinois project, Tracy married Edmond Pierre Montminy (1907-1972) in 1941. By July of that year, she was working on a painting titled The Bathers, for the post office in Kennebunkport, Maine, which centered on beach-goers and colorful umbrellas. As soon as she started painting, objections to the modernist style and subject matter surfaced from numerous prominent local citizens. A barrage of letters went back and forth between Washington, D. C. bureaucrats and Tracy, as well as the postmaster. Though she completed the mural, the citizens of Kennbunkport, led by Kenneth Roberts and Booth Tarkington, took up collection and raised enough funds to buy a replacement mural painted by Gordon Grant. The United States Senate agreed in March, 1945 to replace Tracy's mural at the post office, with Grant's. By the time she heard of the Senate's decision, her mural had been replaced and she and Pierre, who was working at the University of Texas at Austin, realized there was nothing they could do.

Elizabeth Tracy legally changed her name to Tracy Montminy and in 1948, was hired at the University of Missouri (MU) to work on the faculty of the Art Department. She initially taught painting and drawing, but in 1976, a proposal to teach mural painting was approved. In the early 1960s, Montminy taught briefly at the American University of Beirut, returning to teach at MU afterward. Her last two murals were painted in 1977 for the Boone National Savings and Loan Association. Montminy continued teaching until 1981, and in 1990, made arrangements for her estate to fund the Montminy Gallery, which is currently maintained through a trust.

Montminy died in 1992 and left her estate to the Boone County Historical Society (BCHS), in Columbia, Missouri. Posthumously, an exhibit entitled Painted Walls was hosted in March 2006 by the BCHS. A celebration in honor of Montiminy's 100th birthday, was held in 2011.

== Gallery ==
The Montminy Art Gallery came to fruition on June 19, 1993, after Tracy Montminy's death. She bequeathed an endowment to the Boone County Historical Society to enable the BCHS to build a gallery to care for the couples works (murals, oil paintings, pen and ink drawings and sketches) as well as works of other artists from the surrounding area. Montminy's husband, Pierre had been an artist and served as chair of the art department at Stephens College prior to his death. The Montminy Gallery opened on April 24, 1994, and is open Wednesday through Sundays with free admission. When the museum was opened, the last two murals Montminy painted were moved to flank the entryway of the gallery.

== Selected works ==
- 1934-1935 "Religion" on the east wall of the delivery room of the Cambridge public library, Cambridge, Massachusetts.
- 1934-1935 "Fine Arts" on the west wall of the delivery room of the Cambridge public library, Cambridge, Massachusetts.
- 1934-1935 "History of Books and Paper" on the east wall of the reading room of the Cambridge public library, Cambridge, Massachusetts.
- 1934-1935 "The Development of the Printing Press" on the west wall of the delivery room of the Cambridge Public Library, Cambridge, Massachusetts.
- 1936 "The Founding of Saugus", Saugus Town Hall, Saugus, Massachusetts.
- 1937? Mural, Salinas y Rocha y Cia department store, Mexico City, Mexico
- 1938 "The Suffolk Resolves: Oppression and Revolt in the Colonies", post office, Milton, Massachusetts.
- 1938-1939 "Terror of the Wilderness:, City Hall, Medford, Massachusetts.
- 1940 "Chicago: Railroad Centre of the Nation", post office, Downers Grove, Illinois.
- 1941 "The Bathers", Kennebunkport, Maine. Presumed lost. Karal Ann Marling in her narrative of the controversy surrounding the painting stated that it was carefully removed and stored by the WPA, but other sources claim it was painted over.
- 1977 Downtown Columbia Missouri, two works, Montminy Art Gallery, Columbia, Missouri.
