= Sociedad Mexicana de Física =

Physics society in Mexico

The Sociedad Mexicana de Física (SMF) (or Mexican Physics Society) is an association of physicists and other collaborators dedicated to contributing to research in different areas of physics, as well as organizing important national events related to physics, such as the Olimpiadas de Física (Physics Olympics) and the Encuentros de enseñanza (Meetings on teaching). The society is also responsible for the accreditation and supervision of learning and teaching in physics at the upper secondary and higher levels. Its main offices are located in the Faculty of Sciences of the Universidad Nacional Autónoma de México (UNAM), in Mexico City. The SMF is divided into specialized divisions, each of which is a sub-organizations focused on a particular area of physics. The SMF was established at a meeting held in December 1950. Carlos Graef Fernández was elected as the inaugural president.

Revista Mexicana de Física is an official publication of the SMF.

== Specialized divisions ==
Currently, the SMF is made up of nine specialized divisions, which are: medical physics; fluids and plasmas; gravitation and mathematical physics; optics; teaching of physics; particles and fields; nuclear physics; radiation physics; and statistical physics.

The SMF has two regional divisions, in Puebla and Tabasco.

== Agreements ==
The SMF has agreements with the American Physical Society (APS), with the Canadian Association of Physicists (CAP), with the Physical Society of Japan (PSJ) and the Sociedad Cubana de Física (SCF) (which publishes the Revista Cubana de Física).

== Activities ==
Some of the activities carried out by the Mexican Physics Society are mentioned below.

=== Physics education accreditation ===
The organization in charge of accrediting physics education programs is the Consejo de Acreditación de Programas Educativos en Física (CAPEF) (i.e. Council for Educational Programs in Physics) made up of the SMF and the Sociedad Matemática Mexicana (SMM). The main function of CAPEF is to supervise and promote the educational quality of physics at the university level.

=== 27th national meeting of scientific dissemination ===
The XXVII Encuentro Nacional de Divulgación Científica (XXVII National Meeting of Scientific Dissemination) was held in the city San Luis Potosí in 2013. Within the framework of the LVI Congreso Nacional de Física (LVI National Congress of Physics), the meeting focused on recreational and non-formal teaching of Science .

=== 19th national teaching meeting ===
The ''XIX Encuentro Nacional sobre la Enseñanza de la Física en el Nivel Medio Superior (XIX National Meeting on the Teaching of Physics at the Higher Secondary Level) was held in Culiacán Rosales, Sinaloa in 2007 from the 1st to the 3rd of October. Among the topics discussed were the teaching strategies and methods of the physical concepts and phenomena and the processes of accreditation of physics teaching at the upper secondary level.
