= Lucy Driscoll =

American art historian (1886-1964)

- Born: January 20, 1886; Chicago, Illinois, U.S.
- Died: August 8, 1964 (aged 78); Chicago, Illinois, U.S.
- Occupation: Art historian
- Awards: Guggenheim Fellowship (1937)

Academic background
- Education: University of Chicago (BA, MA)

Academic work
- Discipline: Art history
- Sub-discipline: Chinese art
- Institutions: Art Institute of Chicago; University of Chicago

Lucy Driscoll (January 20, 1886 – August 8, 1964) was an American sinologist and art historian. She taught at the College of the University of Chicago from 1913 to 1952, serving as an assistant professor for most of the duration. She co-authored Chinese Calligraphy (1935) with Kenji Toda and won a 1937 Guggenheim Fellowship for a Chinese art theory book that was never completed due to the Second Sino-Japanese War.

== Biography ==
Lucy Driscoll was born January 20, 1886, at Chicago, Illinois, daughter of Florence (née Sprague) and Daniel Colelough Driscoll. She studied at the University of Chicago, where she obtained a B.A. in 1908 and an M.A. in 1909. She also studied abroad, including in Europe and Asia.

Driscoll's career started out at the Art Institute of Chicago, where she was assistant to the director from 1909 to 1913. In 1913, she joined the College of the University of Chicago as an art history instructor, being promoted to assistant professor in 1925. Although she often taught art criticism and theory, she also taught psychology, and her art classes covered both Western and Eastern styles.

Driscoll was a 1931 Harvard–Yenching Institute Fellow. Her book, Chinese Calligraphy, was "the first scholarly account in English to articulate the principles, styles, and techniques of China’s most esteemed art form"; she completed it in 1932 before having it published in 1935. She co-authored the book with Kenji Toda, a fellow faculty member who worked at the Department of Zoology as an illustrator, and illustrations were provided by Berthold Laufer, who worked at the nearby Field Museum. In 1937, she was awarded a Guggenheim Fellowship "for the collection of materials in China for completion of a book on Chinese theory of art as applied to painting and calligraphy". Although substantial progress was made, the book was never completed after work on it halted after the Second Sino-Japanese War began the same year.

Driscoll had extensive correspondence with psychologist Kurt Koffka and artist Huang Binhong, with Elinor Pearlstein calling her an influence on the role of Gestalt psychology in Chinese art. She visited East Asia only once, in 1935.

In 1952, Driscoll retired from UChicago. At the time of her death, she lived at the South Shore in Chicago.

Driscoll died on August 7, 1964, at Albert Merritt Billings Hospital in Chicago. She was 78. A private funeral was held for her.

== Bibliography ==
- (with Kenji Toda) Chinese Calligraphy (1935) (Note: Reviews of this book:)
