= Jacob Hauser =

American poet

Jacob Hauser was an American poet.

His work appeared in Poetry. He was a 1936 Guggenheim Fellow. In 1948, he mimeographed poems, which he gave away.

He criticed Modernist literature as

anti-democracy...[which] tolerates no departure from its inflexible requirement of distorted, pathological incoherence. leading warriors and agents of the Revolution ... founded the court wherein all literary aspirants and offenders are tried and sentenced according to a code in whose making they had no share.... The verdict of ‘Literary decapitation!’ will issue inexorably.

== Works ==
- Dark metropolis, B.C. Hagglund, 1932
- Diversity of darkness, 1933
- City pastorals, Hagglund Press, 1940
- Future harvest: Poems, 1943
- Man and nature, 1946
- Solo: the one man poetry magazine, The Author, 1956
- Valentine for Venus: a rococo sonnet-sequence, J. Hauser, 1963
- Walt Whitman: a biographical poem, 1966
- Cast of characters: Poems, 1967
- Key of beauty: a suite of impressionistic poems, 1967
- Proserpina: House of dawn, 1967
- Green & golden rhyme: sonnets, Hub Publications, 1977, ISBN 978-0-905049-28-1
- Selected works, Hub Publications, 1977, ISBN 978-0-905049-44-1
