= Sherburne F. Cook =

American historian

- Born: December 31, 1896; Massachusetts, United States
- Died: November 7, 1974 (aged 77); Monterey Peninsula, California, U.S.
- Education: Harvard University (BS, MA, PhD)
- Occupations: Physiologist, Professor at UC Berkeley

Sherburne Friend Cook (December 31, 1896 – November 7, 1974) was an American physiologist and demographist, who served as professor and chairman of the department of physiology at the University of California, Berkeley. He was notable as a pioneer in population studies of the native peoples of North America and Mesoamerica and in field methods and quantitative analysis in archaeology.

Born and raised in Massachusetts, Cook earned his B.S. degree at Harvard University in 1919. During World War I, he served in France. He returned to Harvard for graduate studies, earning his M.A. in 1923, and completing his Ph.D. thesis, The Toxicity of the Heavy Metals in Relation to Respiration, in 1925. He taught physiology at University of California, Berkeley from 1928 until his retirement in 1966, becoming a tenured professor and also serving as chairman of the department.

Cook repeatedly returned to the problems of estimating the pre-Columbian populations of California, Mexico, and other regions, and of tracing the rate and reasons for their subsequent decline. He often arrived at higher figures for pre-contact populations than had previous scholars, and his work has not escaped criticism within this controversial field (e.g., W. Michael Mathes 2005).

== Selected publications ==
- "The Extent and Significance of Disease among the Indians of Baja California". 1935. Ibero-Americana No. 12. University of California, Berkeley.
- "The Population of Central Mexico in the Sixteenth Century"'. 1948. Ibero-Americana No. 31. University of California, Berkeley.
- (with Woodrow Borah) Essays in Population History. 1971–1979. 3 vols. University of California Press, Berkeley.
- The Conflict between the California Indians and White Civilization. 1976. University of California Press, Berkeley. (Reprinting six studies originally published in Ibero-Americana, 1940–1943)
- The Population of the California Indians, 1769-1970. 1976. University of California Press, Berkeley.

== Honors ==
- Guggenheim Fellowships awarded in 1938
