= Sotero Prieto Rodríguez =

Mexican mathematician

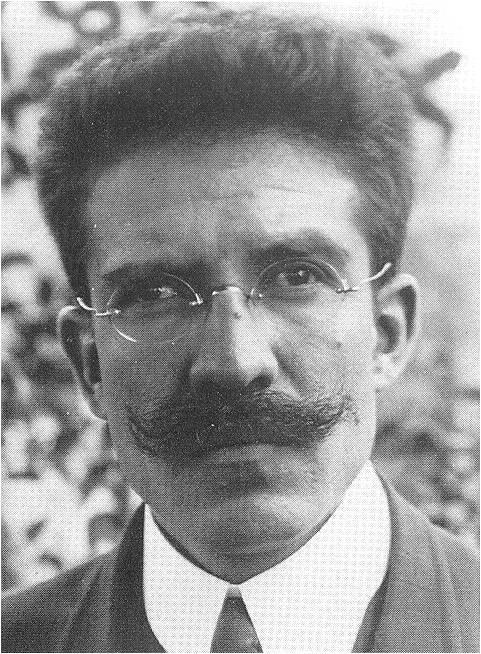
- Sotero Prieto Rodríguez
- Born: December 25, 1884; Guadalajara, Mexico
- Died: May 22, 1935 (aged 50); Mexico City
- Education: National Autonomous University of Mexico
- Occupation: Mathematician
- Spouse: Isabel Rio de la Loza Salazar (m. 1918)
- Children: Agustín Prieto Río de la Loza; Raúl Prieto Río de la Loza

Sotero Prieto Rodríguez (December 25, 1884 – May 22, 1935) was a Mexican mathematician who taught at the National Autonomous University of Mexico. Among his students were physicist Manuel Sandoval Vallarta, physicist and mathematician Carlos Graef Fernández, and engineer and Rector of UNAM Nabor Carrillo Flores.

== Early life ==
Sotero Prieto Rodríguez was the son of the mining engineer and mathematics teacher Raúl Prieto González Bango and Teresa Rodríguez de Prieto. He was the cousin of Isabel Prieto de Landázuri, a distinguished poet, considered the first Mexican romantic. In 1897, at twelve years of age, Prieto arrived in Mexico City and began his preparatory studies in the Instituto Colón de don Toribio Soto, finishing them at the Escuela Nacional Preparatoria in 1901. In 1902 he was accepted as a student in the Escuela Nacional de Ingenieros where he studied of course of civil engineering, which he completed in 1906, without which he would never have received the corresponding degree.

== Career ==
Still being very young, he began teaching and carried out mathematical studies. He influenced notably the change and progress of mathematical research in Mexico, by influencing the then new generation of engineers and students of the exact sciences at the National Autonomous University of Mexico.

He was a teacher of Manuel Sandoval Vallarta in the Escuela Nacional Preparatoria and of Alberto Barajas Celis, Carlos Graef Fernández and of Nabor Carrillo Flores in the Escuela Nacional de Ingenieros, currently the Facultad de Ingeniería.

In 1932, he established the Mathematics Section of the Sociedad Científica "Antonio Alzate", currently the Academia Nacional de Ciencias de México, where his students presented the results of their research.

== Death ==
According to some close people, it was said that Prieto had expressed judgement that if he passed fifty years of age without having achieved some great discovery in his specialty, he would commit suicide, a statement which no-one took seriously. However, at midday of May 22, 1935 in house number 2 of Génova Street, Mexico City, when he was alone, he tragically fulfilled the promise that he had made himself. However, according to his family, the reasons for his suicide were others.

== Bibliography ==
- Vasconcelos, José.- La Raza Cósmica.- México, Editorial Botas, S.A., 1926. p. 156.
- Armendáriz, Antonio. – Hermandad Pitagórica.- México, Novedades, March 21, 1987, P. Editorial.
