= Leland H. Jenks =

American economist

Leland Hamilton Jenks (April 10, 1892 – February 1, 1976) was an American economic historian, Professor of economics and sociology at Wellesley College, and Professor at Columbia University, where he taught economic history. He is known for his work on the economic history of the migration of British capital and of the American railroad in the 19th century.

== Biography ==
Born in Ottawa, Kansas to Wilbur Simpson Jenks and May Hamilton, Jenks received his AB at the Ottawa University in 1913 and his A.M. from the University of Kansas in 1914. In the year 1920/21 he studies at the London School of Economics, and in 1927 received his PhD from Columbia University.

In 1917 Jenks had started his academic career as instructor in history at the University of Minnesota. From 1919 to 1920 he was assistant professor of History and Political and Social Science at Clark College, before his year in London. Back in the States he became associate professor of History and Social and Economic Institutions at Amherst College. In 1926 he was appointed professor of history at Rollins College, before moving to the Wellesley College, where in 1930 he was appointed Professor of Social Institutions. He was awarded a Guggenheim Fellowships in 1936.

== Selected publications ==
- Jenks, Leland Hamilton. The migration of British capital to 1875. Nelson, 1927; 1963.
- Jenks, Leland Hamilton. Our Cuban Colony: A Study in Sugar. Scholarly Press, 1928; 1972.

Articles, a selection:

- Jenks, Leland H. "Railroads as an economic force in American development." The Journal of Economic History 4.01 (1944): 1-20. JSTOR 2113700
- Jenks, Leland H. "Role structure of entrepreneurial personality." Change and the Entrepreneur: Postulates and Patterns for Entrepreneurial History (1949): 108–152.
- Jenks, Leland H. "Early phases of the management movement." Administrative Science Quarterly (1960): 421–447.
- Jenks, Leland H. "Approaches to entrepreneurial personality." Explorations in enterprise (1965): 80–92.
