= List of Guggenheim Fellowships awarded in 1941 =

Eighty-five Guggenheim Fellowships were awarded in 1941.

== 1941 U.S. and Canadian Fellows ==
Category	Field of Study	Fellow	Institutional association	Research topic	Notes	Ref
Creative Arts	Fiction	Hermann J. Broch		The Death of Virgil	Also won in 1940	
Creative Arts	Fiction	Wilbur Joseph Cash		Writing		
Creative Arts	Fiction	Brainard Cheney	The Nashville Banner	Writing		
Creative Arts	Fiction	Edwin Corle		Writing		
Creative Arts	Fiction	Oliver La Farge		Writing		
Creative Arts	Fiction	Andrew Nelson Lytle	The Charlotte News	Writing	Also won in 1940, 1959	
Creative Arts	Fiction	James Still		Writing	Also won in 1946	
Creative Arts	Fine Arts	Richmond Barthé		Sculpture	Also won in 1940	
Creative Arts	Fine Arts	Federico Castellon		Painting	Also won in 1950	
Creative Arts	Fine Arts	Thomas Craig		Painting: Impoverished people in the Southwest United States		
Creative Arts	Fine Arts	Lee Jackson		Painting		
Creative Arts	Fine Arts	Bruce Mitchell		Painting		
Creative Arts	Fine Arts	Leonard Pytlak		Printmaking		
Creative Arts	Fine Arts	Ruth Reeves		Ancient and modern textiles of South America	Also won in 1940	
Creative Arts	Fine Arts	Marion Sanford		Sculpture	Also won in 1942	
Creative Arts	Music Composition	Paul Bowles		Compositions including The Wind Remains		
Creative Arts	Music Composition	Hunter Johnson		Composing	Also won in 1954	
Creative Arts	Music Composition	Marc Blitzstein		Composing	Also won in 1940	
Creative Arts	Music Composition	Alvin Etler		Composing	Also won in 1940, 1963	
Creative Arts	Music Composition	Earl Robinson		Dramatization of Carl Sandburg's The People, Yes	Also won in 1940	
Creative Arts	Photography	Walker Evans		New York subway portraits	Also won in 1940, 1959	
Creative Arts	Photography	Dorothea Lange		American social scene in rural communities		
Creative Arts	Photography	Eliot Furness Porter		Bird photography	Also won in 1946	
Creative Arts	Poetry	Reuel Denney		Writing		
Creative Arts	Poetry	Norman Rosten		Writing		
Creative Arts	Poetry	Delmore Schwartz		Writing	Also won in 1940	
Humanities	British History	Arthur J. Marder		British sea power in the dreadnought era, with reference to the German naval menace from 1905-1914	Also won in 1946, 1947	
Humanities	British History	David Harris Willson	University of Minnesota	Biography of James I	Also won in 1943, 1948, 1963	
Humanities	Classics	Eric Alfred Havelock	University of Toronto		Also won in 1943	
Humanities	Classics	Doro Levi	Institute for Advanced Studies	Mosaics of Antioch-on-the-Orontes	Also won in 1942	
Humanities	Economic History	William Thomas Easterbrook	Brandon College			
Humanities	English Literature	Gordon Norton Ray	Harvard University	Preparation of a definitive edition of letters and private papers of Thackeray	Also won in 1942, 1945, 1956	
Humanities	English Literature	Mark Schorer	Harvard University	Relationship between ideas and forms in the poetry of William Blake	Also won in 1942, 1948, 1973	
Humanities	Fine Arts Research	Saul S. Weinberg		Archaeological study of the Aegean region and the Near East in the Neolithic period and early Bronze Age	Also won in 1942	
Humanities	French Literature	André Benjamin Delattre	Wayne State University	Edition of the correspondence of Voltaire with Theodore, François, and Jean-Robert Tronchin	Also won in 1951	
Humanities	General Nonfiction	Carey McWilliams	California State Division of Immigration and Housing	Plantation labor in Hawaii	Also won in 1944	
Humanities	General Nonfiction	Gustavus Myers		History of Bigotry in the United States (published 1943)	Also won in 1942	
Humanities	History of Science and Technology	Edward Rosen	City University of New York		Also won in 1945	
Humanities	Iberian & Latin American History	Lewis Hanke	Library of Congress	Spanish discovery, exploration, and administration of America		
Humanities	Iberian & Latin American History	Helen Sullivan Mims		Book on the history of the democratic tradition of Spain	Also won in 1942	
Humanities	Linguistics	George L. Trager	Yale University	Languages of Slavic-speaking immigrants and their families in Pennsylvania coal and iron mining communities, and the mutual influences these languages have on each other, on the language of the immigrants' children, and on the English of the immigrants themselves		
Humanities	Literary Criticism	Arthur James Marshall Smith	Michigan State College	Critical and historical study of Canadian poetry		
Humanities	Spanish and Portuguese Literature	Eduardo Neale-Silva	University of Wisconsin	The Spanish-American novel		
Humanities	United States History	Lewis Eldon Atherton	University of Missouri			
Humanities	United States History	Albert Katz Weinberg	Institute for Advanced Study	Historical evolution of American nationalism		
Natural Sciences	Astrology and Astrophysics	Maud Worcester Makemson	Vassar College	Problems of Mayan astronomy		
Natural Sciences	Biochemistry and Molecular Biology	Horace Albert Barker	University of California	Bacteriological biochemistry	Also won in 1961	
Natural Sciences	Chemistry	Verner Schomaker	California Institute of Technology	Spectroscopic study of molecules		
Natural Sciences	Chemistry	Aristid von Grosse	Columbia University	Processes to utilize uranium-235 as a source of atomic power	Also won in 1940	
Natural Sciences	Earth Science	Ernst Cleveland Abbe	University of Minnesota	Bearing of historical, climactic, and geological factors on the vegetation of a heavily glaciated region in the eastern subarctic		
Natural Sciences	Earth Science	William Christian Krumbein	University of Chicago	Dynamical processes by which sedimentary particles are abraded, changed in shape, and sorted into deposits found in nature		
Natural Sciences	Earth Science	George Prior Woollard		Seismic, gravitational, and magnetic investigations of the geologic structure underlying the North American Atlantic coastal plain	Also won in 1942	
Natural Sciences	Mathematics	Richard Dagobert Brauer	University of Toronto	Modern algebra, with special reference to the theory of groups of finite order and their characters		
Natural Sciences	Mathematics	Jesse Douglas		Calculus of variation and geometry	Also won in 1940	
Natural Sciences	Mathematics	Deane Montgomery	Smith College	Action of topographical transformation of groups on various types of spaces, particularly on Euclidean spaces and manifolds		
Natural Sciences	Mathematics	Alfred Tarski	Harvard University	Mathematical logic and the logical foundations of mathematics	Also won in 1942, 1955	
Natural Sciences	Molecular and Cellular Biology	I. L. Chaikoff	University of California	Radioactive phosphorus and iodine in "tracer studies" of metabolic processes in animals		
Natural Sciences	Molecular and Cellular Biology	John Thomas Medler		Nutritional requirements and the chemistry of salivary secretions of certain insects		
Natural Sciences	Neuroscience	Kenneth Stewart Cole	Columbia University	Electrical aspects of the structure and function of living nerve		
Natural Sciences	Neuroscience	Berry Campbell	University of Oklahoma School of Medicine	Integrative mechanisms of the spinal cord, with reference to the basic locomotor patterns of behavior	Also won in 1940	
Natural Sciences	Organismic Biology and Ecology	Dietrich H. Bodenstein	Stanford University	Metamorphosis in insects	Also won in 1942	
Natural Sciences	Organismic Biology and Ecology	Cornelius Becker Philip	United States Public Health Service	Book on ticks and their relation to animal and human diseases		
Natural Sciences	Organismic Biology and Ecology	Benjamin P. Sonnenblick	Queens College, CUNY	Embryology of the fruit fly, with special reference to the cytology and differentiation of the organs and organ systems in the larva		
Natural Sciences	Physics	Willard Libby	University of California	Application of atom smashing methods to the chemistry of living things	Also won in 1951, 1959	
Natural Sciences	Physics	Wilson M. Powell	Kenyon College	Cosmic ray research, particularly a cloud chamber study of the abundance and energy distribution of slow protons and mesotrons at high altitudes	Also won in 1942	
Natural Sciences	Physics	Harvey Elliott White	University of California	Spectroscopic analysis of the gases of Mauna Loa Volcano		
Natural Sciences	Physics	Volney Colvin Wilson	University of Chicago	Development of machinery for the production of high energy x-rays		
Natural Sciences	Plant Science	Adriance Sherwood Foster	University of California	Cyto-histological study of the growth of buds of tropical ferns in Hawaii	Also won in 1948	
Natural Sciences	Plant Science	Margaret Fulford	University of Cincinnati	Taxonomic study of the Hepaticae of Mexico and Central America		
Natural Sciences	Plant Science	George Thomas Johnson		Botanical field work and collection in South America	Also won in 1940	
Social Science	Anthropology and Cultural Studies	Roy Franklin Barton	St. Andrew's School	Translation of the Hudhud	Also won in 1945	
Social Science	Anthropology and Cultural Studies	Isabel Truesdell Kelly	University of California	Ethnographic and archaeologic investigations in Jalisco	Also won in 1940	
Social Science	Anthropology and Cultural Studies	Dorothy Mary Spencer	University of Pennsylvania	Munda people	Also won in 1945	
Social Science	Anthropology and Cultural Studies	Edward H. Spicer	University of Arizona	Comparative study of the influences of contact with other cultures upon the Yaqui communities of Mexico and Arizona	Also won in 1955	
Social Science	Economics	Merrill Kelley Bennett	Stanford University	Competition between wheat and rice as food in Hawaii		
Social Science	Economics	Paul Theodore Ellsworth	University of Cincinnati	Economy of Chile, 1920-1940		
Social Science	Economics	Clarence Dickinson Long, Jr.	Wesleyan University	History of unemployment in the United States	Also won in 1942	
Social Science	Political Science	Eugene Alfred Forsey	McGill University			
Social Science	Political Science	Gerald Sanford Graham	Queen's University			
Social Science	Political Science	Francis D. Wormuth	Indiana University			
Social Science	Psychology	Rudolf Arnheim		Application of the principles and methods of Gestalt psychology to art analysis	Also won in 1942	
Social Science	Psychology	Solomon E. Asch	Brooklyn College	Book on the formation and change of opinion and attitude	Also won in 1943	
Social Science	Psychology	Edward Girden	Brooklyn College	Comparative investigation of the neurophysicological determinants of the phenomena of dissociation	Also won in 1958	
Social Science	Psychology	George Katona		Psychology of learning, with special reference to the differences in learning by understanding and learning by memorization and drill	Also won in 1940	
Social Science	Sociology	Edward Prince Hutchinson	Library of Congress	Socioeconomic significance of population		

== 1941 Latin American and Caribbean Fellows ==
Category	Field of Study	Fellow	Institutional association	Research topic	Notes	Ref
Creative Arts	Fiction	Ramón Sender		Book on the civilization resulting from the Spanish-Indian amalgam following the Spanish conquest		
Creative Arts	Fine Arts	Antonio Rodríguez Luna			Also won in 1942	
Humanities	Education	Olga Cossettini	Dr. G. Carrasco Experimental School	Elementary and vocational education in the United States		
Natural Sciences	Earth Science	Nabor Carrillo	National University of Mexico	Soil mechanics and its application to the construction of building and dam foundations	Also won in 1940	
Natural Sciences	Engineering	Augusto José Durelli		Photoelastic method of determining stresses and the application of this method to practical problems in reinforced concrete design		
Natural Sciences	Medicine and Health	Washington Buño	Institute of Endocrinology (Montevideo)	Endocrinology	Also won in 1947	
Natural Sciences	Medicine and Health	Aníbal Cipriano da Silveira Santos	Juqueri Psychiatric Hospital	Electrical activity of the cortex of the brain and its variations under pathological conditions		
Natural Sciences	Medicine and Health	José Ribeiro do Valle	Instituto Butantan			
Natural Sciences	Medicine and Health	Nilson Torres de Rezende		Neurophysiology	Also won in 1940	
Natural Sciences	Medicine and Health	Luis Vargas Fernández		Research at University of Washington	Also won in 1942	
Natural Sciences	Molecular and Cellular Biology	Américo S. Albrieux Murdoch	Institute of Endocrinology (Montevideo)	Endocrinology, particularly hormone therapy	Also won in 1940	
Natural Sciences	Molecular and Cellular Biology	Otto Guilherme Bier	Biological Institute (São Paulo)	Quantitative chemical studies of immunity phenomena	Also won in 1945, 1946	
Natural Sciences	Molecular and Cellular Biology	Efrén Carlos del Pozo	National School of Biological Sciences	Electrical stimulation of muscle	Also won in 1942	
Natural Sciences	Molecular and Cellular Biology	Maurício Rocha e Silva	Biological Institute (São Paulo)	Pharmacological properties of trypsin	Also won in 1940	
Natural Sciences	Physics	Mário Schenberg	University of São Paulo	Application of nuclear and atomic physics to astrophysics	Also won in 1940	
Natural Sciences	Physics	Facundo Bueso Sanllehí	University of Puerto Rico	Band spectra	Also won in 1940	
Natural Sciences	Plant Science	Agesilau Antonio Bitancourt	Biological Institute (São Paulo)	Virus diseases and of on other economic plants		
Natural Sciences	Plant Science	Edgar do Amaral Graner	Instituto Agronômico de São Paulo	Cytogenetics of corn and tobacco		
Natural Sciences	Plant Science	Juan Ignacio Valencia	National University of Cuyo	Taxonomic and morphological studies of South American forage plants	Also won in 1942, 1943	
Social Science	Political Science	Santos Primo Amadeo	University of Puerto Rico	Comparative study of the constitutional law of the Argentine Republic and the United States	Also won in 1940	

== See also ==
- Guggenheim Fellowship
- List of Guggenheim Fellowships awarded in 1940
- List of Guggenheim Fellowships awarded in 1942
