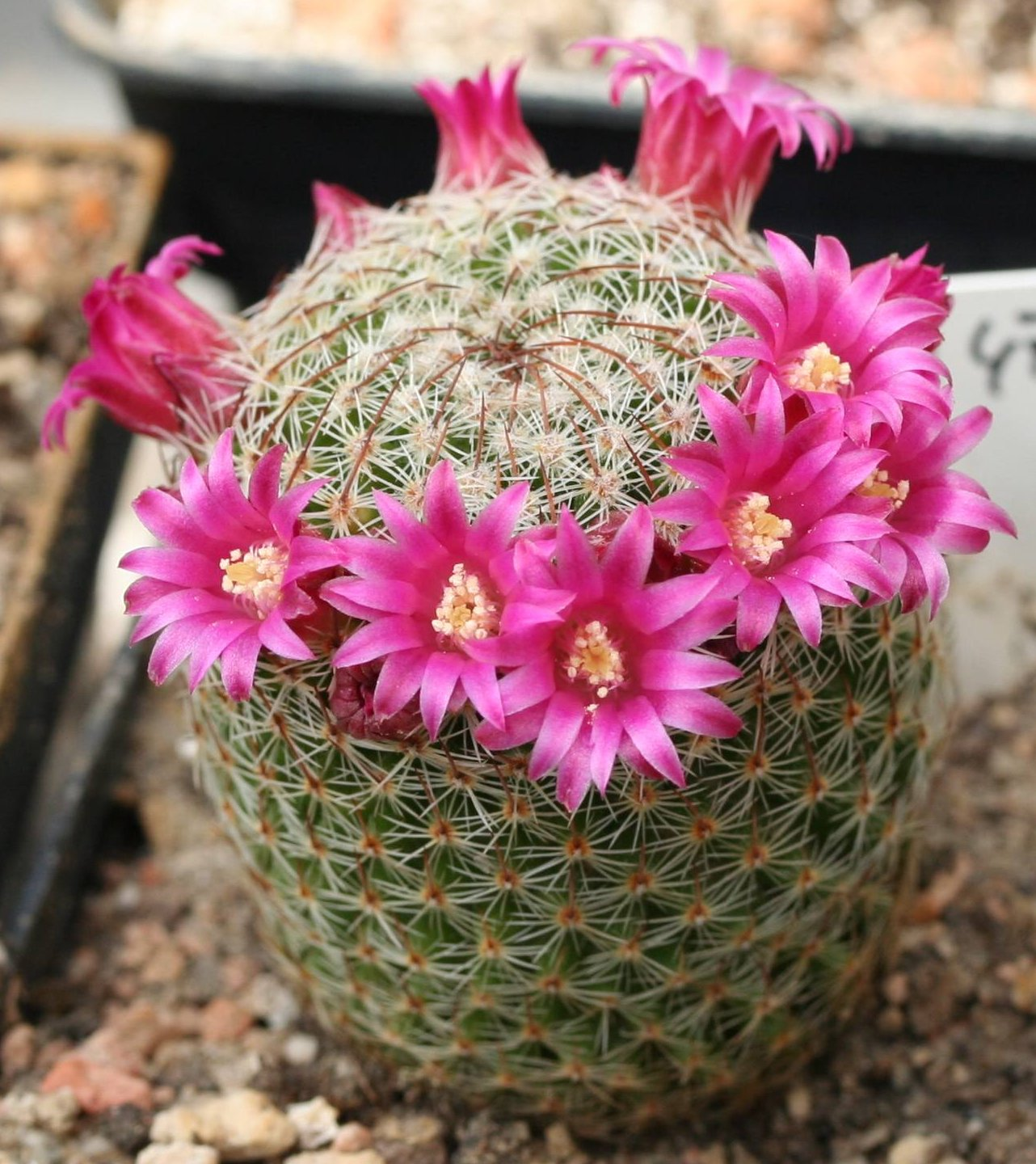
- A young, not yet sprawling plant

Conservation status
- Data Deficient (IUCN 3.1)

Scientific classification
- Kingdom: Plantae
- Clade: Tracheophytes
- Clade: Angiosperms
- Clade: Eudicots
- Order: Caryophyllales
- Family: Cactaceae
- Subfamily: Cactoideae
- Genus: Mammillaria
- Species: M. matudae

Binomial name
- Mammillaria matudae Bravo, 1956

= Mammillaria matudae =

Species of cactus

Mammillaria matudae, commonly known as the thumb cactus, is a species of cactus from Mexico. It was named after the botanist Eizi Matuda.

Mammillaria matudae is a succulent subshrub. It grows either solitarily or in clusters from its base. Its cylindrical stems are slender, reaching 10–20 cm in height and about 3 cm in diameter, and have a sprawling or creeping habit. A variety, described as var. serpentiformis but no longer separately recognized, can grow up to a meter long and 7 cm wide. The axils are smooth and bare. It features 18–20 delicate, translucent white radial spines, each just 2–3 mm long. A single central spine (two in the untypified var. serpentiformis fa. duocentralis) stands out, pinkish-white when young and aging to a dull white, measuring 4–5 mm. The flowers are small but striking, with pale reddish-purple petals, about 12 mm in length and width. Its fruit, green with a reddish tint, houses brown seeds.

Mammillaria matudae grows primarily in the desert or dry scrubland. It has been reported in the state of Mexico, at elevations between 700 and 1,250 meters, near the Miguel Alemán hydroelectric system at La Punta, Tingambato, close to the border with Michoacán (at 19°4'N, 100°22'W). There appears to be some confusion in other collections regarding this species, as there is a town named Tingambato in Michoacán. However, this town is approximately 160 kilometers from the border with the state of Mexico, just beyond which the type locality is found.

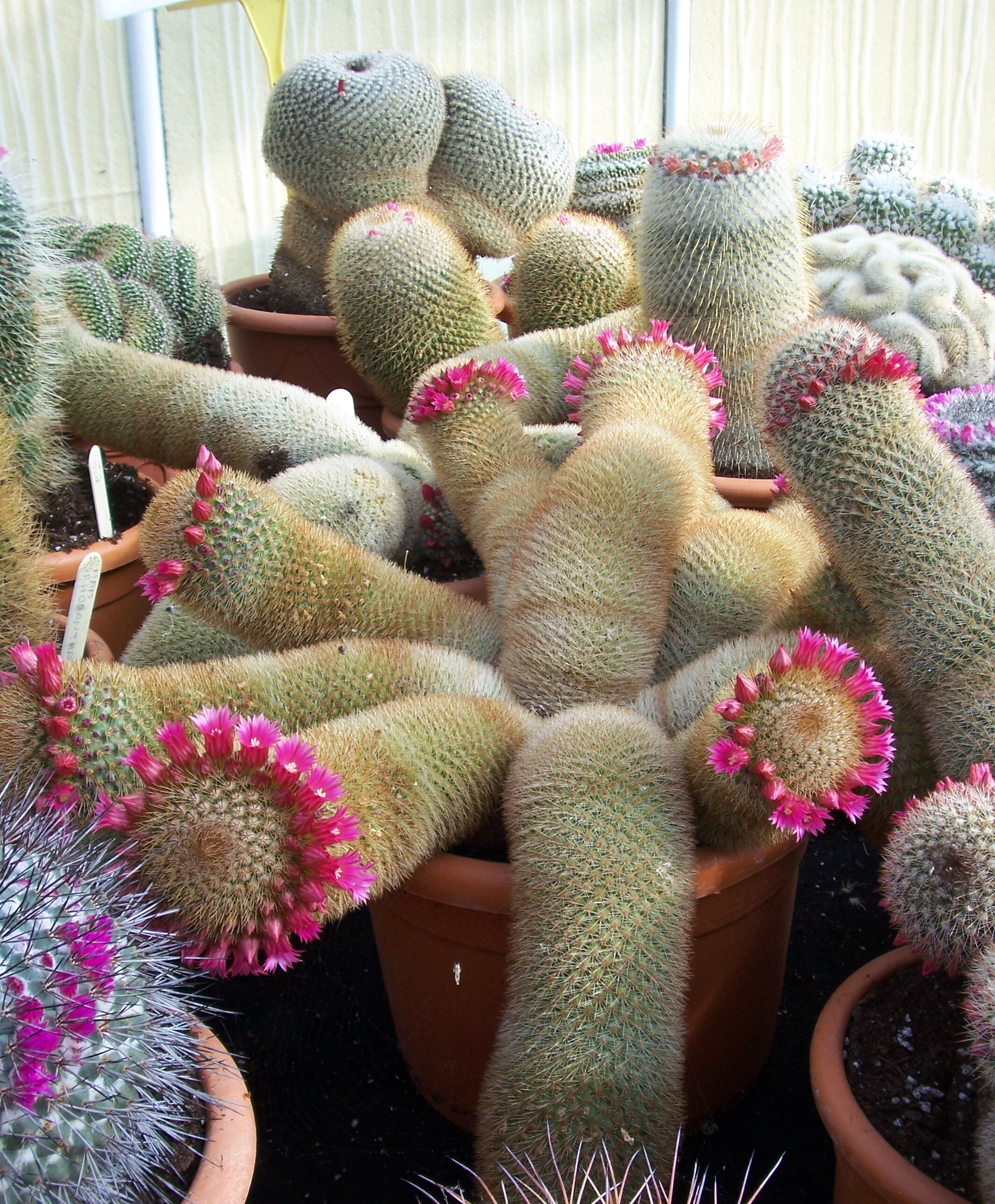
M. matudae is not likely to stay within the boundaries of its pot.

In cultivation, Mammillaria matudae has a tendency to sprawl over other plants. To prevent this and save space, the cacti nurseryman John Pilbeam recommends growing it upside-down by pulling the stem through a hole in the bottom of a hanging pot.

Mammillaria matudae is legally protected in Mexico by the national list of species at risk of extinction. It is listed under category "subject to special protection".
