= Hilda Florence Rosene =

American plant physiologist (1897–1978)

Hilda Florence Rosene Lund (March 26, 1897 – December 21, 1978) was an American plant physiologist. She was awarded a Guggenheim Fellowship in 1939 for her work on measuring water absorption by roots.

== Early life and education ==
Hilda Florence Rosene was born in 1897 in Chicago, Illinois. She moved with her family to Washington State in 1900, and grew up on a dairy farm in the Snoqualmie Valley. She graduated from Lincoln High School in Seattle, before earning a teacher's diploma at Western Washington College of Education in 1917. She pursued an interest in marine science through an undergraduate degree from the University of Washington in 1922, and earned a master's degree there as well in 1924. In 1929, after several years as an educator, she returned to graduate studies at the University of Texas at Austin, where she completed her doctorate in 1933, with a dissertation titled "Contributions to the Electro-Chemistry of the Cell".

== Career ==
Rosene stayed at the University of Texas as professor in the Department of Zoology, from 1933 until her retirement in 1958. She was one of only two women who held tenured faculty positions at the University of Texas in the natural sciences in her time. She contributed to an ecological survey of the Texas coast in the late 1930s.

Rosene won a Guggenheim Fellowship in 1939, for work on water intake by plant roots. She was co-author (with E. J. Lund) of Bioelectic Fields and Growth (University of Texas Press 1947).

== Personal life ==
Hilda Rosene married fellow scientist Elmer Julius Lund in 1955; he had been her doctoral adviser many years before. Her husband died in 1969, and she died in 1978, age 81.

She funded an E. J. Lund endowment at the Marine Science Institute in her husband's memory.
