= Walter Rice Sharp =

American political scientist

Walter Rice Sharp (January 25, 1896 – March 27, 1977) was an American political scientist.

He was born on January 25, 1896. Sharp attended Wabash College. Upon graduation, he served in the United States military as an infantry captain. After the end of World War I, Sharp enrolled at Yale University. Further graduate study at the University of Bordeaux in France was funded by the American Field Service Fellowship awarded in 1920. Sharp received a doctorate in law in 1922, and returned to the United States. He taught at Washington and Lee University from 1923 to 1924, then joined the University of Wisconsin–Madison faculty for fifteen years. Sharp was awarded a Guggenheim Fellowship in 1939. While a professor at City College of New York, Sharp served as an adviser to the United Nations, working successively with the Food and Agriculture Organization, the World Health Organization, and UNESCO. Sharp ended his career with another fifteen years on the faculty of Yale University, and retired in 1964. He died on March 27, 1977, in Palo Alto, California.

The Hoover Institution Library and Archives holds a collection of Sharp's papers.
