= Manuel Sandoval Vallarta =

Mexican physicist (1899–1977)

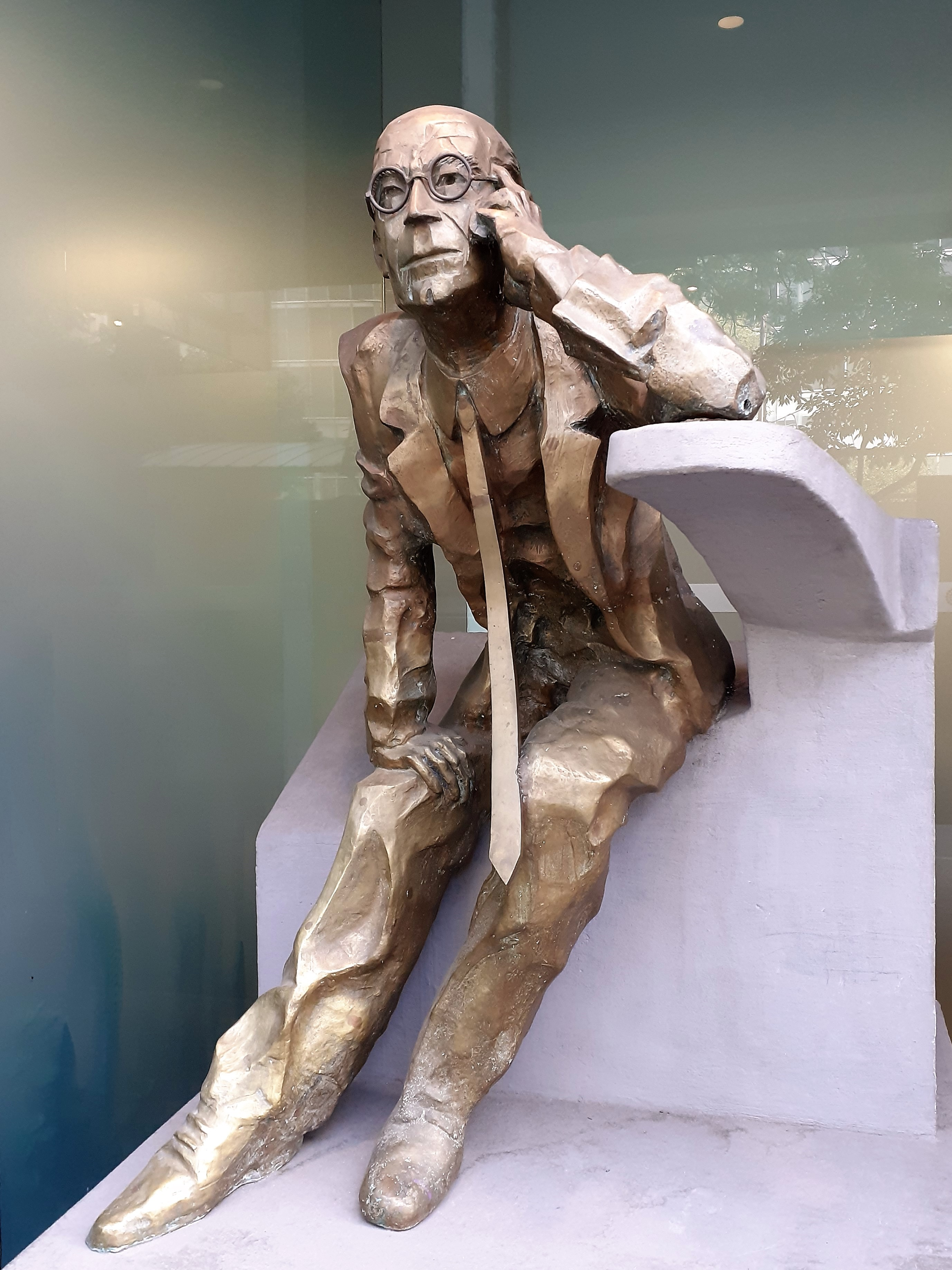
- Sculpture of Manuel Sandoval Vallarta in the CONACyT building
- Born: 11 February 1899; Mexico City
- Died: 18 April 1977 (aged 78); Mexico City
- Education: MIT
- Known for: Cosmic ray research
- Spouse: María Luisa Margain
- Awards: Légion d'honneur (France, 1952); National Prize for Exact Sciences (Mexico, 1961)
- Scientific career
- Workplaces: MIT; UNAM
- Notable students: Richard Feynman and Julius Stratton

L-R Manuel Vallarta, George Uhlenbeck (back), John Van Vleck and David Inglis at Washington, American Physical Society (APS). AIP Catalog ID: Vallarta Manuel D6

Manuel Sandoval Vallarta (11 February 1899 – 18 April 1977) was a Mexican physicist. He was a Physics professor at both MIT and the Institute of Physics at the National Autonomous University of Mexico (UNAM).

== Biography ==
Sandoval Vallarta was born in Mexico City into a family that descended from Ignacio Vallarta, a prominent liberal leader during the War of Reform. He received his B.S. in physics from MIT in 1921; in 1924, MIT awarded him his Ph.D. He joined MIT's physics faculty in 1923, eventually rising to the rank of full professor. In 1927, Vallarta received a two-year Guggenheim Fellowship to study physics in Germany. The Universities of Berlin and Leipzig hosted him, and he was able to learn from Albert Einstein, Max Planck, Erwin Schrödinger, and Werner Heisenberg. He was elected to the American Academy of Arts and Sciences in 1928.

While at MIT, Vallarta was a mentor to Richard Feynman and Julius Stratton. In fact, he was the co-author of Feynman's first scientific publication, a letter to Physical Review concerning the scattering of cosmic rays. This led to an interesting Feynman story:

Vallarta let his student in on a secret of mentor-protégé publishing: the senior scientist's name comes first. Feynman had his revenge a few years later, when Heisenberg concluded an entire book in cosmic rays with the phrase: "such an effect is not to be expected according to Vallarta and Feynman." When they next met, Feynman asked gleefully whether Vallarta had seen Heisenberg's book. Vallarta knew why Feynman was grinning. "Yes," he replied. "You're the last word in cosmic rays."

With Georges Lemaître, a Belgian physicist and Catholic priest, Vallarta theoretically predicted that the intensity of cosmic rays should vary with latitude because these charged particles are interacting with the Earth's magnetic field. However, they were unaware that Bruno Rossi had already predicted such latitude effect (along with the east–west effect) a few years before, in 1930. They also worked on a theory of primary cosmic radiation and applied it to their investigations of the Sun's magnetic field and the effects of the galaxy's rotation.

From 1943 to 1946, he divided his time between MIT and UNAM. By 1946, he chose to remain with UNAM full-time.

While at UNAM, he worked with Luis Alvarez and Arthur Compton on experiments to show that cosmic rays were composed of protons.

Later in life, Vallarta became involved in administration. In 1946, he became a member of the governing board of UNAM, and was director of the National Polytechnic Institute from 1944 to 1947. He served on and led a number of commissions for the Mexican government, mostly relating to science policy, and represented his country at numerous international conferences. He was elected to the American Philosophical Society in 1954.

== See also ==
- MIT Physics Department
