= Sharon Hartman Strom =

Scholar of history

Sharon Hartman Strom is an American historian, women's studies scholar, educator, and writer. She is known for her work in United States 19th and 20th-century history, including the study of women’s rights, sexuality, labor, race, and gender. Strom is a Professor Emerita of History at University of Rhode Island.

She received a Ph.D. from Cornell University in 1969.

== Publications ==
- Strom, Sharon Hartman (1992). Beyond the Typewriter: Gender, Class, and the Origins of Modern American Office Work, 1900–1930. Urbana, IL: University of Illinois Press.
- Strom, Sharon Hartman (2001). Political Woman: Florence Luscomb and the Legacy of Radical Reform. Volume 79 of Critical Perspectives on the Past. Temple University Press. ISBN 9781566398190.
- Strom, Sharon Hartman (2003). Women's Rights. Westport, CT: Greenwood Press. ISBN 9780313311352.
- Strom, Sharon Hartman; Stinton, Frederick (2011). Confederates in the Tropics; Charles Swett's Travelogue. University of Mississippi Press. ISBN 9781604739954.
- Strom, Sharon Hartman (2016). Fortune, Fame, and Desire; Promoting the Self in the Long Nineteenth Century. Rowman & Littlefield Publishers. ISBN 9781442272668.

=== Articles ===
- Strom, Sharon Hartman (1978). "Italian American Women and their Daughters in Rhode Island: The Adolescence of Two Generations, 1900-1950". In Caroli, Betty Boyd; Harney, Robert F.; Tomasi, Lydio F. (eds.). The Italian Immigrant Woman in North America. Proceedings of the 10th annual conference of the American Italian Historical Association. Toronto, ON: The Multicultural History Society of Ontario Toronto. pp. 191–205. ISBN 978-0969091608.
- Strom, Sharon Hartman; Hewitt, Nancy A.; Lebsock, Suzanne (December 1, 1995). "Visible Women: New Essays on American Activism". American Historical Review. doi:10.2307/2170050. JSTOR 2170050.
- Strom, Sharon Hartman (2006). "Susan Porter Benson, 1943-2005". Radical History Review. 2006 (95): 272–275. doi:10.1215/01636545-2006-95-272.
