= Howard Wolf =

American author, educator and lecturer (1936–2023)

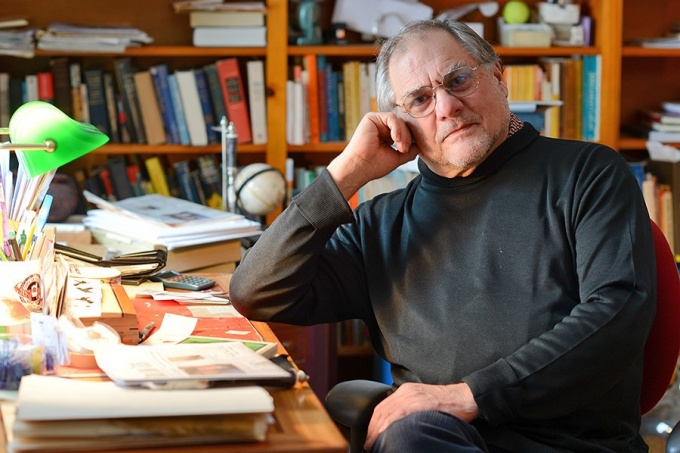
- Wolf in his office at the University at Buffalo in 2016
- Born: Howard R. Wolf; November 5, 1936; New York City, U.S.
- Died: October 7, 2023 (aged 86); Buffalo, New York, U.S.
- Education: Amherst College (BA); Columbia University (MA); University of Michigan (PhD)
- Occupations: Author; educator; lecturer
- Years active: 1967–2023

Howard R. Wolf (November 5, 1936 – October 7, 2023) was an American author, educator and lecturer.

== Early life and education ==
Howard R. Wolf was born on November 5, 1936 in New York City.

He attended the Horace Mann School in New York City before attending Amherst College, where he earned a B.A. in 1959. He earned an M.A. from Columbia University in 1960 and a Ph.D from the University of Michigan in 1967.

== Career ==
He was a full-time professor at the University at Buffalo's English department for 40 years, from 1967 to 2007, then an adjunct professor there until 2010. Wolf continued to teach a course on travel writing as a part of University at Buffalo's Discovery Seminars Program.

Wolf was the author of ten books and more than three hundred publications. His work spans literary and social criticism, fiction, memoir, education theory and practice, travel and creative nonfiction. Amherst College's Archives and Special Collections has been collecting Wolf's work since 1971. The collection includes thousands of submissions, including "literary manuscripts, correspondence, news clippings, ephemera and other materials documenting the professional and personal life of writer, critic and educator Howard R. Wolf."

Wolf's books have received critical acclaim. His book, The Education of a Teacher, was included in the publication of record, The Call to Reform Liberal Education: Great Books of 1987. And his short story, "Gardens," was mentioned as a favorite submission in the Spring 2010 issue of Poetica Magazine.

Wolf was a two-time Fulbright lecturer in Turkey (1983) and South Africa (1998) and lectured for three years at the University of Hong Kong.

== Death ==
Wolf died on October 7, 2023 in Buffalo, New York.

== Awards ==
- 1967 Hopwood Award for Fiction
- 1983-1984 Fulbright Scholarship, Ankara University, Turkey
- 1998 Fulbright Scholarship, University of the Free State, South Africa
- 2007 Emeritus Professor and Senior Fellow, Department of English (UNY-Buffalo)
- 2007 Senior Academic Visitor (SAV), Wolfson College, Cambridge University, Spring, 2007.
- 2016 MacDowell Colony Fellow

== Books ==
- The Voice Within: Reading and Writing Biography (with Roger J. Porter). Knopf. 1973. ASIN B0006C3VBM.
- Forgive the Father: A Memoir of Changing Generations. New Republic Books. 1978. ISBN 0-915220-44X.
- The Education of a Teacher. Prometheus Books. 1987. ISBN 978-0879753740.
- This is India: Recording Reality Itself. Academic Foundation. 1992. ISBN 978-8171880904.
- The Continuing Education of a Teacher: The Role of Self in Higher Education. Academic Foundation. 1992. ISBN 978-8171880898.
- A Version of Home: Letters from the World : an Autobiographical Journey Through Singapore, Malaysia, India, Greece, and Turkey. Academic Foundation. 1992. ISBN 9788171880843.
- The Autobiographical Impulse in America Essays on The Crisis of Humanism in Contemporary Culture. Academic Foundation. 1993. ISBN 9788171880911.
- Broadway Serenade. Academic Foundation. 1996. ISBN 978-8171881024.
- Far-Away Places: Lessons in Exile. Artzy Books. 2007. ISBN 978-1932687996.
