= Janet de Coux =

American sculptor (1904–1999)

- Born: October 5, 1904; Niles, Michigan
- Died: 1999 (aged 94–95); Richland Township, Allegheny County, Pennsylvania
- Education: Carnegie Institute of Technology (1924-1926), Fellow at Tiffany Foundation (Summer 1927), New York School of Industrial Design (1928-1929), Rhode Island School of Design (1929-1930), School of the Art Institute of Chicago (1930-1931), Instructor, Cranbrook Academy of Art
- Known for: Sculpture
- Awards: Association Prize, Associated Artists of Pittsburgh (1936), Guggenheim Memorial Fellowship (1938), Honored as a Distinguished Daughter of Pennsylvania, The Lindsay Memorial Prize, The Widener Gold medal, Honored as Pittsburgh Artist of the Year

Janet de Coux (or De Coux) (October 5, 1904 – December 1999) was an American sculptor born in Niles, Michigan to Bertha Wright de Coux and the Reverend Charles John de Coux. She is best remembered for her ecclesiastical reliefs and statues.

== Early years ==
When she was eight years old her family moved to Gibsonia, Pennsylvania, near Pittsburgh. While still in high school De Coux began attending the Carnegie Institute of Technology where she studied with Joseph Bailey Ellis. Deciding that the program there was not geared enough to the fine arts she moved to The Louis Comfort Tiffany Foundation and then she attended the school of the Art Institute of Chicago. Whitney Warren wrote her a letter of introduction to C. Paul Jennewein, for whom she worked as an assistant. This was followed by stints working for Aristide Cianfarani in Providence, where she attended the Rhode Island School of Design, and with Alvin Meyer in Chicago. Later she served as an assistant to James Earle Fraser after she had helped enlarge his equestrian statue of Theodore Roosevelt.

During the Great Depression US President Franklin Deleno Roosevelt initiated the New Deal. One of its programs was the Federal Art Projects under which the federal government hired artists, mostly painters and sculptors to create art for a variety of public places, often post offices. De Coux carved a relief, "Vacation Time" for the post office in Girard, Pennsylvania. In 1984 the piece was listed as “in storage.”

== Later career ==
German critic Anton Henze selected de Coux's “St. Benedict” as one of the United States’ notable, recent (1956) contributions to Roman Catholic art in his work ‘’Contemporary Church Art.

== Work ==
Her work can be found at the following locations:

- Brookgreen Gardens, Murrells Inlet, South Carolina
- National Academy of Design, New York, New York
- Smithsonian American Art Museum, Washington, District of Columbia
- National Gallery of Art, Washington, District of Columbia
- University of Notre Dame, Snite Museum of Art, Notre Dame, Indiana
- Harvard University, Harvard Art Museum, Fogg Museum, Cambridge, Massachusetts
- State Museum of Pennsylvania, Memorial Hall, Harrisburg, Pennsylvania
- St. Stephen's Episcopal Church, Sewickley, Pennsylvania
- Sacred Heart Elementary School, Pittsburgh, Pennsylvania
- Society of Medalists
- St.Scholastica's Church, Aspinwall, Pennsylvania
