= Carlos Graef Fernández =

Mexican physicist and mathematician (1911–1988)

- Born: February 25, 1911; Guanaceví, Durango
- Died: January 13, 1988 (aged 76); Mexico City
- Education: National Autonomous University of Mexico
- Awards: National Prize for Arts and Sciences (Mexico)
- Scientific career
- Fields: Physics, mathematics
- Workplaces: National Autonomous University of Mexico; Tonantzintla Observatory

Carlos Graef Fernández (February 25, 1911 – January 13, 1988) was a Mexican physicist and mathematician. A graduate of the National Autonomous University of Mexico (UNAM) and the Massachusetts Institute of Technology (MIT), he was a founding member of the Mexican Mathematical Society and the Mexican Physical Society. He helped to establish the Tonantzintla Observatory and he later directed it. He received the National Prize for Arts and Sciences in 1970.

== Biography ==
Graef Fernández was born in Guanaceví, Durango, where his father was a mining engineer. He had two younger siblings; his brother Hermann became an accomplished physician. He attributed an early interest in science to a physics book that his mother gave him as a child.

Graef Fernández first studied at a German school in Mexico, then went to Technische Hochschule Darmstadt (today Technische Universität Darmstadt) in the German city of Darmstadt for a couple of years before returning to Mexico. He completed his undergraduate education at UNAM, and he was influenced by UNAM scientists Manuel Sandoval Vallarta and Sotero Prieto, who each mentored several successful Mexican scientists.

Awarded a Guggenheim Fellowship and other assistance, including a stipend awarded by Mexican president Lázaro Cárdenas, Graef Fernández went to MIT. Around that time, he married Alicia Sánchez Castell and they later had three children. He completed a doctorate at MIT in 1940 and worked at Harvard University. At Harvard, Graef Fernández met Luis Enrique Erro, who invited him to join the effort to found the Tonantzintla Observatory in the Mexican state of Puebla. In The Skin of the Sky, Graef Fernández is described as "small, round and prone to a cordiality that made him lovable"; he seemed an unlikely partner for Erro, who was a slender, elegant man with a hearing aid.

Ultimately, Graef Fernández was more interested in studying gravitational issues than astrophysics, so he sought an academic position. He joined the UNAM faculty, where he directed the Institute of Physics and the Faculty of Sciences. Graef Fernández organized the meeting that led to the establishment of the Mexican Mathematical Society in 1943. He was also a founding member of the Mexican Physical Society in 1951. The society awards the Carlos Graef Fernández Prize. He was awarded the National Prize for Arts and Sciences in 1970.

Graef Fernández served on numerous committees related to the nuclear industry. He was made an emeritus professor at UNAM in 1974 and died in 1988.
