= Jon Corbino =

Italian-born American painter

Jon Corbino (April 3, 1905 – July 10, 1964) was an Italian-born American painter. Born in Sicily, he emigrated to the United States and attended the Art Students League of New York and the Pennsylvania Academy of Fine Arts. His work is in the collections of many museums, including the Museum of Modern Art, the Pennsylvania Academy of the Fine Arts, the Portland Art Museum, the Smithsonian American Art Museum, the Walker Art Center, and the Whitney Museum of American Art.
