= Guggenheim Fellowship =

Grant in the arts, awarded annually

Guggenheim Fellowships are grants that have been awarded annually since 1925 by the John Simon Guggenheim Memorial Foundation, endowed by Simon and Olga Hirsh Guggenheim. These awards are bestowed upon individuals who have demonstrated distinguished accomplishment in the past and potential for future achievement. The recipients exhibit outstanding aptitude for prolific scholarship or exceptional talent in the arts.

The foundation holds two separate competitions each year:

- One open to citizens and permanent residents of the United States and Canada.
- The other to citizens and permanent residents of Latin America and the Caribbean. The Latin America and Caribbean competition is currently suspended "while we examine the workings and efficacy of the program. The U.S. and Canadian competition is unaffected by this suspension."

Performers (e.g. musicians, actors, and dancers) are excluded from these fellowships, but composers, film directors, and choreographers are eligible to apply. Students are not qualified to apply; advanced professionals in mid-career, such as published authors, are encouraged to do so. Upon receipt of the grant, Fellows are free to use the funds however they deem fit. The goal of the grant is to provide recipients with dedicated time and freedom to pursue their projects or artistic endeavours, while being relieved of their regular duties. Applicants are required to submit references as well as a CV and portfolio.

As of 2025, the Guggenheim Memorial Foundation has funded over 19,000 Fellows with a total sum of almost $400 million since its inception. Each year, the foundation receives a high number of applications; since its formation it has seen anywhere between 500 and 4,000 applications. Out of these, approximately 175 fellowships are awarded. The size of each grant varies and the amount and duration of the grant is adjusted based on the individual needs of the recipients, taking into consideration their other resources and the purpose and scope of their plans. The average grant awarded is between $40,000 and $55,000.

== John Simon Guggenheim Memorial Foundation ==
John Simon Guggenheim Memorial Foundation
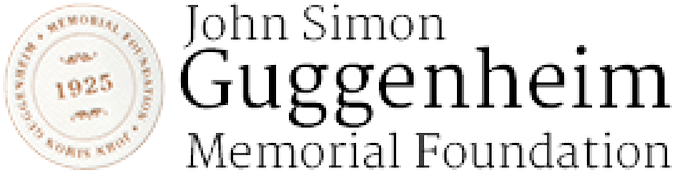
- Formation: 1925; 101 years ago
- Founder: Olga Guggenheim; Simon Guggenheim
- Headquarters: Manhattan, New York City, U.S.
- President: Edward Hirsch
- Website: gf.org

The John Simon Guggenheim Memorial Foundation is a private foundation formed in 1925 by Olga and Simon Guggenheim in memory of their son, who died on April 26, 1922. In 1924, Senator Guggenheim appointed Henry Allen Moe to oversee the creation of the foundation and to lead its first years. The Foundation was officially chartered and incorporated by New York State and Governor Alfred E. Smith on March 16, 1925. The organization awards Guggenheim Fellowships to professionals who have demonstrated exceptional ability by publishing a significant body of work in the fields of natural sciences, social sciences, humanities, and the creative arts, excluding performing artists.

In 2025, the Foundation announced their appointment of the 100th class of Guggenheim Fellows, including 198 individuals working across 53 disciplines. To commemorate the centennial year of the Foundation, a special exhibit, The Guggenheim Fellowship at 100, was mounted at the New York Historical Museum. The exhibit, opened August 29, 2025 that ran through November 30, 2025, explores the rarely seen archives of the Foundation and highlights some of the most notable Guggenheim Fellows of the last century.

== University affiliations of Guggenheim fellows ==
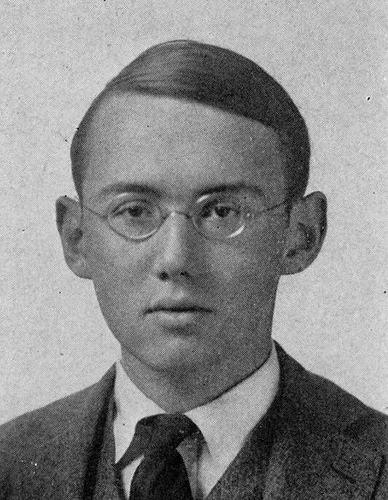
Pulitzer Prize for Poetry-winning poet and writer Stephen Vincent Benét authored John Brown's Body as a Guggenheim Fellow in Paris in 1926.

Since the inaugural class of 1925, over 19,000 fellowships have been awarded. Harvard University counts the most affiliated fellows at 176, followed by Yale University and Princeton University in 2nd and 3rd place, respectively.

Institution	Fellows (1925-2022)
Harvard University†	176
Yale University	102
Princeton University	96
University of California, Berkeley	73
Columbia University†	72
Stanford University	65
University of Chicago	64
Cornell University	54
University of Pennsylvania	51
University of Michigan	41

† Harvard includes Radcliffe and Columbia includes Barnard College

== Lists of Guggenheim Fellows ==
1920s						1925	1926	1927	1928	1929
1930s	1930	1931	1932	1933	1934	1935	1936	1937	1938	1939
1940s	1940	1941	1942	1943	1944	1945	1946	1947	1948	1949
1950s	1950	1951	1952	1953	1954	1955	1956	1957	1958	1959
1960s	1960	1961	1962	1963	1964	1965	1966	1967	1968	1969
1970s	1970	1971	1972	1973	1974	1975	1976	1977	1978	1979
1980s	1980	1981	1982	1983	1984	1985	1986	1987	1988	1989
1990s	1990	1991	1992	1993	1994	1995	1996	1997	1998	1999
2000s	2000	2001	2002	2003	2004	2005	2006	2007	2008	2009
2010s	2010	2011	2012	2013	2014	2015	2016	2017	2018	2019
2020s	2020	2021	2022	2023	2024	2025	2026			

== See also ==
- MacArthur Fellows Program
- Thomas J. Watson Fellowship
