= List of Guggenheim Fellowships awarded in 1953 =

One hundred and ninety-one scholars, artists, and scientists received Guggenheim Fellowships in 1953. $780,000 was disbursed among them. Thirty recipients received their second, third, or fourth Guggenheim award.

== 1953 U.S. and Canadian fellows ==
Category	Field of Study	Fellow	Institutional association	Research topic	Notes	Ref
Creative Arts	Fiction	Godfrey Blunden		Writing		
Creative Arts	Fiction	Owen Vincent Dodson	Howard University	Early version of Come Home Early, Child (published 1977)		
Creative Arts	Fiction	Thomas Hal Phillips		The Loved and the Unloved (published 1955)	Also won in 1956	
Creative Arts	Fiction	Elizabeth Spencer Rusher	University of Mississippi	The Voice at the Back Door (published 1956)		
Creative Arts	Fine Arts	Roger Allen Baker				
Creative Arts	Fine Arts	Leonard Baskin		Printmaking		
Creative Arts	Fine Arts	Misch Kohn	Illinois Institute of Technology	Printmaking	Also won in 1952	
Creative Arts	Fine Arts	Armin Landeck	Brearley School	Painting		
Creative Arts	Fine Arts	Harold Paris			Also won in 1954	
Creative Arts	Fine Arts	Charles Schucker		Painting		
Creative Arts	Music Composition	Mark Bucci		Operas and a TV fantasy	Also won in 1957	
Creative Arts	Music Composition	Henry Bryan Dority		Composing	Also won in 1952	
Creative Arts	Music Composition	Paul Fetler	University of Minnesota	Symphony No. 3	Also won in 1960	
Creative Arts	Music Composition	Alan Hovhaness		Composing	Also won in 1954	
Creative Arts	Music Composition	Andrew W. Imbrie	University of California, Berkeley	Composing	Also won in 1960	
Creative Arts	Music Composition	John Ayres Lessard	SUNY Stony Brook	Compositions including Four Preludes, a commission from Hope College	Also won in 1946	
Creative Arts	Music Composition	Nikolai Lopatnikoff	Carnegie Institute of Technology	Composing	Also won in 1945	
Creative Arts	Music Composition	Bohuslav Martinů		Composing	Also won in 1956	
Creative Arts	Photography	William A. Garnett		Low altitude, high-speed aerial photography	Also won in 1956 and 1975	
Creative Arts	Photography	Max Yavno				
Creative Arts	Poetry	Edgar Collins Bogardus	Carnegie Institute of Technology	Writing		
Creative Arts	Poetry	Paul Hamilton Engle	State University of Iowa	Writing	Also won in 1957 and 1959	
Creative Arts	Poetry	Karl Jay Shapiro	Poetry	Writing	Also won in 1944	
Humanities	American Literature	Perry Dickie Westbrook	New York State College for Teachers			
Humanities	Architecture, Planning and Design	Clay Lancaster	Columbia University, Cooper Union, and Metropolitan Museum of Art	Influence of eastern art upon modern decorative arts and architectural design	Also won in 1964	
Humanities	Architecture, Planning and Design	Aladár Olgyay	University of Texas	Climate influences in architecture in various US regions	With Victor Olgyay	
Humanities	Architecture, Planning and Design	Victor Olgyay	Princeton University	Climate influences in architecture in various US regions	With Aladár Olgyay	
Humanities	Architecture, Planning and Design	Edwin Daisley Thatcher		Ancient Roman methods of radiant heating by means of warm air		
Humanities	Biography	William Clyde DeVane	Yale University	Robert Browning		
Humanities	Biography	Francis Joseph Byrne Hackett	Yale University			
Humanities	Biography	Walter Magnes Teller		Joshua Slocum		
Humanities	British History	James Alexander Gibson	Carleton College	Constitution of Canada		
Humanities	British History	Garrett Mattingly	Columbia University	Political, military, and diplomatic events centering on the defeat of the Spanish Armada	Also won in 1936, 1945, and 1960	
Humanities	British History	Caroline Robbins	Bryn Mawr College	Transmission of the English tradition of liberty		
Humanities	Classics	Marion Elizabeth Blake		Mosaic pavements of Roman Italy	Also won in 1927 and 1929	
Humanities	Classics	Henry Snyder Gehman	Princeton Theological Seminary	History of religious thought		
Humanities	Classics	Virginia Randolph Grace		Kourion excavations in Cyprus	Also won in 1938	
Humanities	Classics	Mabel L. Lang	Bryn Mawr College	Changing standards of weights and measures throughout Athenian history		
Humanities	Classics	Robert Lorentz Scranton	Emory University	The architectural development of medieval Corinth in Greece		
Humanities	Classics	Kurt von Fritz	Columbia University	Development of Greek historiography		
Humanities	East Asian Studies	Arthur William Hummel	Library of Congress	Annotating the journal of Harriet Low, 1829-1834		
Humanities	East Asian Studies	Edward Hetzel Schafer	University of California, Berkeley	Chinese medieval civilization	Also won in 1968	
Humanities	East Asian Studies	Benjamin Isadore Schwartz	Harvard University	Intellectual development of modern China from the end of the 19th century until the Communist assumption of power		
Humanities	East Asian Studies	Arthur Frederick Wright	Stanford University	Sui dynasty, 589-617 AD		
Humanities	English Literature	Kathleen Coburn	University of Toronto	Unpublished writings of Samuel Taylor Coleridge	Also won in 1956	
Humanities	English Literature	Rudolf B. Gottfried	Indiana University	Historical writing in England, 1500-1625		
Humanities	English Literature	Gordon Sherman Haight	Yale University	Letters of George Eliot	Also won in 1946 and 1960	
Humanities	English Literature	Alfred Harbage	Harvard University	Methods of staging and acting Shakespeare's plays	Also won in 1965	
Humanities	English Literature	Charlton Hinman			Also won in 1954	
Humanities	English Literature	James Gilmer McManaway	Folger Shakespeare Library	Life of William Shakespeare		
Humanities	English Literature	Edgar F. Shannon Jr.	Harvard University	Tennyson's literary career		
Humanities	English Literature	Ernest Sirluck	University of Chicago	Milton's political theory in relation to the Puritan Revolution		
Humanities	Fine Arts Research	Justus Bier	University of Louisville	Tilman Riemenschneider	Also won in 1956	
Humanities	Fine Arts Research	Charles de Tolnay	Princeton University	Artistic conceptions of Leonardo da Vinci and their origin	Also won in 1948 and 1949	
Humanities	Fine Arts Research	Irene Emery	Santa Fe Laboratory of Anthropology	Structure of primitive textiles		
Humanities	Fine Arts Research	James Thomas Flexner		History of American painting, 1760-1830	Also won in 1980	
Humanities	Fine Arts Research	George Howard Forsyth Jr.	University of Michigan	Paleochristian architecture		
Humanities	Fine Arts Research	Anthony Nicholas Brady Garvan	University of Pennsylvania	Early Pennsylvania architecture and town planning, 1680-1750		
Humanities	Fine Arts Research	Ernst Kitzinger	Harvard University	History of early-Christian and Byzantine arts		
Humanities	Fine Arts Research	Richard Krautheimer			Also won in 1950 and 1963	
Humanities	Fine Arts Research	Robert L. Van Nice	Harvard University	Byzantine architecture		
Humanities	Fine Arts Research	Nathalia Wright	University of Tennessee	Horatio Greenough		
Humanities	Folklore and Popular Culture	Tristram Potter Coffin	Denison University	American folklore		
Humanities	Folklore and Popular Culture	Frederic Ramsey Jr.		Afro-American music of Alabama, Louisiana, and Mississippi, 1860-1900	Also won in 1955	
Humanities	French History	William Farr Church	Brown University	Political thought in 17th-century France	Also won in 1945 and 1948	
Humanities	French Literature	Margaret Gilman	Bryn Mawr College	The conception of poetry, and related problems, in French literature, 1700-1850		
Humanities	General Nonfiction	Marion Lena Starkey	University of Connecticut	Social, economic, and political aspects of Shay's Rebellion, 1786-1787	Also won in 1958	
Humanities	German and East European History	Andreas Dorpalen	St. Lawrence University	Heinrich von Treitschke		
Humanities	German and East European History	Chester Verne Easum	University of Wisconsin	History of the Hohenzollern Empire, 1871-1918		
Humanities	German and East European History	Robert George Leeson Waite	Williams College	German nationalism since World War II		
Humanities	German and Scandinavian Literature	Heinrich Meyer	Muhlenberg College	Benedictus Spinoza and his critics		
Humanities	German and Scandinavian Literature	Victor Amandus Oswald, Jr	University of California, Los Angeles			
Humanities	German and Scandinavian Literature	Samuel Dickinson Stirk	University of Manitoba	Friedrich August Wolf		
Humanities	Latin American Literature	Clinton H. Gardiner	Washington University in St. Louis	Martín Lopez, Hernán Cortés' master shipbuilder		
Humanities	Linguistics	Robert Anderson Hall Jr.	Cornell University	Melanesian and Australian Pidgin English	Also won in 1970	
Humanities	Linguistics	Anna Granville Hatcher	Johns Hopkins University	Comparative syntax		
Humanities	Literary Criticism	Cleanth Brooks	Yale University	Literary criticism in relation to literary history and literary scholarship	Also won in 1960	
Humanities	Literary Criticism	Wallace Warner Douglas	Northwestern University	William Wordsworth	Also won in 1972	
Humanities	Literary Criticism	William York Tindall	Columbia University	Literary symbol in our time		
Humanities	Literary Criticism	Leonard Howard Unger	University of Minnesota	Possible uses for literary theory of certain of Freud's terms and concepts		
Humanities	Medieval Literature	Alfred L. Kellogg	Rutgers University	Development of Chaucer's philosophical ideas		
Humanities	Medieval Literature	James Hinton Sledd	University of Chicago	Development of colloquial English in England and America		
Humanities	Music Research	Angela Diller	Mills College	Music teaching, with special reference to the piano		
Humanities	Music Research	Eta Harich-Schneider		Japanese court music	Also won in 1954 and 1955	
Humanities	Near Eastern Studies	Benno Landsberger	University of Chicago	Ancient languages and cultures of the Near East	Also won in 1956	
Humanities	Near Eastern Studies	Hal Lehrman		Studies in Israel	Also won in 1951	
Humanities	Philosophy	Arthur Walter Burks	University of Michigan	Foundations of scientific inference		
Humanities	Philosophy	Enrico De Negri	Columbia University	Secularization of the structures in Christian theology in the philosophic and economic systems of Hegel and Marx		
Humanities	Philosophy	Charles Frankel	Columbia University	Philosophy of history and politics, with special reference to the foundations of liberalism		
Humanities	Philosophy	Sidney Hook	New York University	Impact of Marxist philosophy on contemporary European thought	Also won in 1928 and 1929	
Humanities	Philosophy	Raymond Klibansky	McGill University	History of platonism	Also won in 1965	
Humanities	Philosophy	Ruth C. B. Marcus		Application of modal logic		
Humanities	Religion	Robert McQueen Grant	University of Chicago	Early Christian thought	Also won in 1950 and 1959	
Humanities	Religion	William Henry Paine Hatch		Greek manuscripts of the New Testament	Also won in 1951	
Humanities	Russian History	Bertram D. Wolfe			Also won in 1949 and 1950	
Humanities	Slavic Literature	Wiktor Weintraub	Harvard University	History of Polish literature from the Middle Ages to 1939		
Humanities	Spanish and Portuguese Literature	Américo Castro	Princeton University	European thought and history in the 16th century		
Humanities	Spanish and Portuguese Literature	Carlos Clavería	University of Pennsylvania	European criticism of Spanish literature		
Humanities	Spanish and Portuguese Literature	Hayward Keniston	Duke University (visting)	Francisco de los Cobos		
Humanities	Spanish and Portuguese Literature	Edwin Jack Webber	University of California, Berkeley	Origins of the Spanish drama		
Humanities	United States History	Arthur Eugene Bestor Jr.	University of Illinois	Intellectual life in the colonial period in America	Also won in 1961	
Humanities	United States History	Arthur Alphonse Ekirch Jr.	American University	History of the liberal tradition in the US		
Humanities	United States History	Robert Reed Ellis	US Army Corps of Engineers	Corps of Engineers of the Confederate States of America		
Humanities	United States History	Robert Douthat Meade	Randolph Macon Woman's College	Patrick Henry	Also won in 1960	
Humanities	United States History	Carl Parcher Russell			Also won in 1952	
Natural Sciences	Applied Mathematics	Werner Goldsmith	University of California, Berkeley	Phenomena incident to the collision of two solid bodies		
Natural Sciences	Applied Mathematics	James Harold Wayland	California Institute of Technology	Complex fluid flow		
Natural Sciences	Astronomy and Astrophysics	Arthur Robert Kantrowitz	Cornell University	Dynamics of gases at very high temperatures, a problem relating to flight speed		
Natural Sciences	Astronomy and Astrophysics	Samuel Silver	University of California, Berkeley	Diffraction of electromagnetic waves by aperatures in an infinite plane sheet	Also won in 1960	
Natural Sciences	Chemistry	Leonard Gascoigne Berry	Queen's College	Crystal structure analysis relating to their atomic arrangement in minerals		
Natural Sciences	Chemistry	Virgil Carl Boekelheide	University of Rochester	Structure of curariform alkaloids		
Natural Sciences	Chemistry	George Jura	University of California, Berkeley	Solid-state physics		
Natural Sciences	Chemistry	Lester Touby Kurtz	University of Illinois	Soil magnesium		
Natural Sciences	Chemistry	Herbert August Laitinen	University of Illinois	Oscillographic techniques involving cobalt complexes	Also won in 1961	
Natural Sciences	Chemistry	Robert Stanley Livingston	University of Minnesota	Process of photosynthesis		
Natural Sciences	Chemistry	Robert Ghormley Parr	Carnegie Institute of Technology	Electronic structure of molecules		
Natural Sciences	Chemistry	Allen Brewster Scott	Oregon State College	Magnetic and optical qualities of color centers in ionic crystals		
Natural Sciences	Chemistry	John Clark Sheehan	Massachusetts Institute of Technology	Isolation and synthesis of peptides		
Natural Sciences	Chemistry	David Henry Templeton	University of California, Berkeley	Crystal chemistry in rare-earth compounds	Also won in 1968	
Natural Sciences	Chemistry	Marjorie Jean Vold	University of Southern California	Nature and magnitude of forces operative between colloidal particles		
Natural Sciences	Chemistry	William E. Wallace	University of Pittsburgh	Properties of solid solutions		
Natural Sciences	Earth Science	George F. Carter	Johns Hopkins University	Soils, terraces, time, and archaeology in the San Diego region, with reference to the antiquity of man in America		
Natural Sciences	Earth Science	John Chambers Crowell	University of California, Los Angeles	Large-scale tectonic displacements in the Alps		
Natural Sciences	Earth Science	Hans Albert Einstein	University of California, Berkeley	Sediment transport by flowing water		
Natural Sciences	Earth Science	Maurice Ewing	Columbia University	Fluidity in the core of the earth	Also won in 1938 and 1939	
Natural Sciences	Earth Science	David Grover Frey	Indiana University	Microfossils in the sediments of lakes in east-central Australia		
Natural Sciences	Earth Science	Charles Merwin Gilbert	University of California, Berkeley	Sediments formed as a result of mountain-making		
Natural Sciences	Earth Science	Colin Osborne Hutton	Stanford University	Australian and New Zealand rare-earth minerals		
Natural Sciences	Earth Science	Helen Niña Tappan Loeblich	US Geological Survey	Taxonomic studies of the foraminifera		
Natural Sciences	Earth Science	Brian H. Mason	Indiana University	Certain igenous rocks in the Kaikōura Mountains	Also won in 1968	
Natural Sciences	Earth Science	Walter Munk	Scripps Institution of Oceanography	Effect of winds on ocean currents	Also won in 1948 and 1962	
Natural Sciences	Earth Science	John Verhoogen	University of California, Berkeley	Temperature distribution and internal composition of the earth	Also won in 1960	
Natural Sciences	Engineering	Harry Donald Conway	Cornell University	Plane stress problems and the theory of elasticity		
Natural Sciences	Engineering	Joe Mauk Smith	Purdue University	Processes of heat and mass transfer in fixed-bed catalytic reactors		
Natural Sciences	Geography and Environmental Studies	Raymond E. Crist			Also won in 1940	
Natural Sciences	Mathematics	Felix Browder	Boston University	Existence and properties of solutions of elliptic partial differential equations	Also won in 1966	
Natural Sciences	Mathematics	Ernest Corominas				
Natural Sciences	Mathematics	Albert Edward Heins	University of Pittsburgh	Application of function-theoretic methods to boundary value problems in diffraction theory		
Natural Sciences	Mathematics	Witold Hurewicz	Massachusetts Institute of Technology	Deformation theory in topology		
Natural Sciences	Mathematics	Øystein Ore	Yale University	Early history of the theory of probability		
Natural Sciences	Mathematics	Ralph Saul Phillips	University of Southern California	Functional analysis and semigroups	Also won in 1973	
Natural Sciences	Mathematics	J. Barkley Rosser	Cornell University	Mathematical logic and number theory		
Natural Sciences	Mathematics	Abraham Seidenberg	University of California	Diffraction of electromagnetic waves		
Natural Sciences	Mathematics	Abraham H. Taub	University of Illinois	Shockwaves and differential geometry	Also won in 1946	
Natural Sciences	Mathematics	Antoni Zygmund	University of Chicago	Solutions of differential equations		
Natural Sciences	Medicine and Health	Luis Valentine Amador	Illinois State Neuropsychiatric Institute	Anatomic relations of the interior of the human brain		
Natural Sciences	Medicine and Health	Ellen Neall Duvall	College of William and Mary	Kinesiology of functional anatomy		
Natural Sciences	Molecular and Cellular Biology	Maynard Andrew Amerine	University of California, Davis	Changes in organic acids during the maturation of grapes		
Natural Sciences	Molecular and Cellular Biology	Konrad Bloch	University of Chicago	Animal tissues	Also won in 1960 and 1975	
Natural Sciences	Molecular and Cellular Biology	Thaddeus S. Danowski	University of Pittsburgh	Physiological concomitants of iodine metabolism		
Natural Sciences	Molecular and Cellular Biology	Edward D. DeLamater	University of Pennsylvania	Cytology, cytochemistry, and cytogenetics of microorganisms		
Natural Sciences	Molecular and Cellular Biology	Ingrith Johnson Deyrup-Olsen	Barnard College	The exchange of ionized minerals and water between living cells and their environment		
Natural Sciences	Molecular and Cellular Biology	John T. Edsall	Harvard University	Protein structure	Also won in 1940	
Natural Sciences	Molecular and Cellular Biology	Lloyd Noel Ferguson	Howard University	Distribution of enzymes in the cytoplasm of amoeba and other organisms		
Natural Sciences	Molecular and Cellular Biology	Edward Hirsch Frieden	Tufts College Medical School	Relation of chemical structure to the biological activity of proteins		
Natural Sciences	Molecular and Cellular Biology	Leon A. Heppel	Public Health Service	RNA chemistry	Also won in 1975	
Natural Sciences	Molecular and Cellular Biology	Alfred George Knudson Jr.	Irwin Army Hospital	Certain biochemical syntheses thought to be controlled genetically		
Natural Sciences	Molecular and Cellular Biology	Henry Koffler	Purdue University	Intermediary metabolism of microorganisms		
Natural Sciences	Molecular and Cellular Biology	Arthur Earl Martell	Clark University	Stabilities of transition metal complexes of optimally active peptides		
Natural Sciences	Molecular and Cellular Biology	Adrian Morris Srb	Cornell University	The mutation and the biochemical evolution of microorganisms		
Natural Sciences	Molecular and Cellular Biology	John Lawrence Oncley	Harvard University	Size, shape, and electrical symmetry of protein molecules		
Natural Sciences	Molecular and Cellular Biology	Carl Pontius Swanson	Johns Hopkins University	Effects of combined radiations on the hereditary materials of living cells		
Natural Sciences	Organismic Biology and Ecology	Joseph R. Bailey	Duke University	Animal life in northeastern Brazil		
Natural Sciences	Organismic Biology and Ecology	Harold F. Blum	Princeton University (visiting)	Problem of the origin of cancer	Also won in 1936 and 1945	
Natural Sciences	Organismic Biology and Ecology	Anthony Calhoun Clement	Emory University	Embryology of marine snails		
Natural Sciences	Organismic Biology and Ecology	Robert H. Denison	Chicago Natural History Museum	Paleozoic vertebrates		
Natural Sciences	Organismic Biology and Ecology	John Thompson Emlen Jr.	University of Wisconsin	Phylogeny of behavior in swallows and other passerine birds		
Natural Sciences	Organismic Biology and Ecology	Herbert Friedmann			Also won in 1950 and 1955	
Natural Sciences	Organismic Biology and Ecology	Carl Gans	Babcock & Wilcox	Taxonomic and ecological studies of certain south Brazilian snakes	Also won in 1977	
Natural Sciences	Organismic Biology and Ecology	Gordon Enoch Gates		Earthworm of Burma	Also won in 1952	
Natural Sciences	Organismic Biology and Ecology	Yoshio Kondo	Bernice P. Bishop Museum	Shells of the Pacific Ocean area	Also won in 1954	
Natural Sciences	Organismic Biology and Ecology	Eugene Nicholas Kozloff	Lewis and Clark College	Commensal and parasitic protozoa of land and freshwater mollusks		
Natural Sciences	Organismic Biology and Ecology	Joseph Arthur Colin Nicol		Comparative physiology of luminescence in marine animals		
Natural Sciences	Organismic Biology and Ecology	George Davis Snell				
Natural Sciences	Physics	Robert Kemp Adair	University of Wisconsin	Low-lying excited states of heavy nuclei		
Natural Sciences	Physics	John Gilbert Daunt	Ohio State University	Low-temperature physics	Also won in 1958	
Natural Sciences	Physics	Martin Deutsch	Massachusetts Institute of Technology	Nuclear transitions and radiations	Also won in 1960	
Natural Sciences	Physics	Henry Alan Fairbank	Yale University	Superfluidity of liquid helium at very low temperatures		
Natural Sciences	Physics	Bernard Taub Feld	Massachusetts Institute of Technology	Interactions involved in the production of mesons by nucleons and by electro-magnetic radiation	Also won in 1960	
Natural Sciences	Physics	Leslie L. Foldy				
Natural Sciences	Physics	Leonard Herbert Hall	University of California, Santa Barbara	Theoretical calculation of acoustic relaxation times in liquids		
Natural Sciences	Physics	Peter Havas	Lehigh University	Relativistic theory of interacting elementary particles		
Natural Sciences	Physics	Wayne Eskett Hazen	University of Michigan	V particles in the cosmic ray group	Also won in 1946	
Natural Sciences	Physics	Robert E. Marshak	University of Rochester	Meson physics	Also won in 1960 and 1967	
Natural Sciences	Physics	Charles Keith McLane	University of Wisconsin	Magnetic thermometry at temperatures approaching absolute zero		
Natural Sciences	Physics	Arnold John Frederick Siegert	Northwestern University	Statistical mechanics and random processes		
Natural Sciences	Plant Science	Lincoln Constance	University of California, Berkeley	South American flowers		
Natural Sciences	Plant Science	Edward Smith Deevey Jr.	Yale University	Development history of lakes in northern Italy		
Natural Sciences	Plant Science	Joseph Andorfer Ewan	Tulane University	History of botany in the US, 1780-1820		
Natural Sciences	Plant Science	Charles Bixler Heiser	Indiana University	Cultivated species of peppers		
Natural Sciences	Plant Science	James Wallace Marvin	University of Vermont	Sap pressures and flow in the sugar maple tree		
Natural Sciences	Plant Science	Conrad Vernon Morton	US National Museum	Ferns of Guatemala		
Natural Sciences	Plant Science	Gerald Bruce Ownbey	University of Minnesota	Prickly poppy of the genus Argemone		
Natural Sciences	Plant Science	George Ledyard Stebbins	University of California, Davis	Genetics of forage grasses	Also won in 1960	
Social Sciences	Anthropology and Cultural Studies	Fred R. Eggan	University of Chicago	Igorot in the Philippines		
Social Sciences	Anthropology and Cultural Studies	Diamond Jenness				
Social Sciences	Anthropology and Cultural Studies	Reba Paeff Mirsky		Lives of children in Zulu society		
Social Sciences	Anthropology and Cultural Studies	Hortense Powdermaker	Queens College	Effect of mass communications on a group of native African peoples		
Social Sciences	Economics	Joseph Dorfman	Columbia University	Development of American eonomic thought, 1918-133		
Social Sciences	Economics	Abram Lincoln Harris	University of Chicago	Social reform	Also won in 1935, 1936, and 1943	
Social Sciences	Education	Howard Lee Nostrand	University of Washington	Place of the humanities in American higher education		
Social Sciences	Law	Joseph Dainow	Louisiana State University	Legal codification and civil code revision		
Social Sciences	Law	Milton R. Konvitz	Cornell University	US Bill of Rights as those rights have been formulated and defined by American courts		
Social Sciences	Political Science	Samuel H. Beer	Harvard University	Structure and function of British political parties		
Social Sciences	Political Science	Rupert Emerson	Harvard University	Development in recent decades of the nationalist movements of the non-white peoples of the world	Also won in 1956	
Social Sciences	Political Science	James E. Gerald Jr.	University of Minnesota	Effects on the British press of the government's economic control policies since 1939		
Social Sciences	Political Science	Howard Jay Graham	Los Angeles County Law Library	Fourteenth Amendment, with special reference to the doctrine of corporate personality, 1860-1890	Also won in 1957	
Social Sciences	Political Science	Samuel Lubell		Republican party of today	Also won in 1950	
Social Sciences	Political Science	Davis McEntire	University of California, Berkeley	Italian population and immigration problems		
Social Sciences	Political Science	J. Roland Pennock	Swarthmore College	Housing legislation		
Social Sciences	Political Science	Clinton Lawrence Rossiter III	Cornell University	American political conservatism		
Social Sciences	Political Science	Jacobus tenBroek	University of California, Berkeley	Wartime power of the military over civilian citizens	Also won in 1961	
Social Sciences	Psychology	Clarence J. Pfaffenberger		Possibility of predicting adult performance from the behavior of young dogs, with the purpose of better selection of guide dogs for blind persons	Also won in 1954	
Social Sciences	Sociology	Margaret Trabue Hodgen	University of California, Berkeley	Origins of social studies in 17th-century Europe		
Social Sciences	Sociology	Howard W. Odum	University of North Carolina	Regional character and folk culture of the south		
Social Sciences	Sociology	T. Lynn Smith			Also won in 1951	

== 1953 Latin American and Caribbean Fellows ==
Category	Field of Study	Fellow	Institutional association	Research topic	Notes	Ref
Creative Arts	Fine Arts	Antonio Frasconi			Also won in 1953	
Creative Arts	Fine Arts	Antonio Joseph		Painting	Also won in 1957	
Creative Arts	Fine Arts	Mauricio Lasansky	Iowa State University		Also won in 1943, 1944, 1945, and 1964	
Humanities	Architecture, Planning and Design	Erwin Walter Palm			Also won in 1952	
Humanities	Economic History	Carlos Augusto Luzzetti				
Natural Sciences	Astronomy and Astrophysics	Jorge Sahade			Also won in 1955	
Natural Sciences	Molecular and Cellular Biology	Gustavo Hoecker	University of Chile	Immunological work on blood groups of mice		
Natural Sciences	Molecular and Cellular Biology	Norberto José Palleroni	Universidad Nacional de Cuyo		Also won in 1954 and 1955	
Natural Sciences	Neuroscience	Carlos Eyzaguirre			Also won in 1954	
Natural Sciences	Neuroscience	Raúl Hernández-Peón				
Natural Sciences	Organismic Biology & Ecology	José Cândido de Melo Carvalho			Also won in 1952	
Natural Sciences	Organismic Biology & Ecology	Anderson Coelho de Andrade				
Natural Sciences	Organismic Biology & Ecology	Fernando da Costa Novaes				
Natural Sciences	Organismic Biology & Ecology	Oswaldo Giannotti				
Natural Sciences	Organismic Biology & Ecology	Norman Millott	University College of the West Indies	Possible correlation between the lunar cycle and reproductive processes of sea urchins		
Natural Sciences	Plant Science	Antonio Krapovickas				
Natural Sciences	Plant Science	Henri Alain Liogier			Also won in 1950 and 1957	
Social Sciences	Anthropology and Cultural Studies	Ricardo Alegría		Earned his doctorate from Harvard University	Also won in 1951	
Social Sciences	Education	Alfredo T. Morales				
Social Sciences	Sociology	Orlando Fals-Borda			Also won in 1954	

== See also ==
- Guggenheim Fellowship
- List of Guggenheim Fellowships awarded in 1952
- List of Guggenheim Fellowships awarded in 1954
