= Branches of microbiology =

List of scientific disciplines

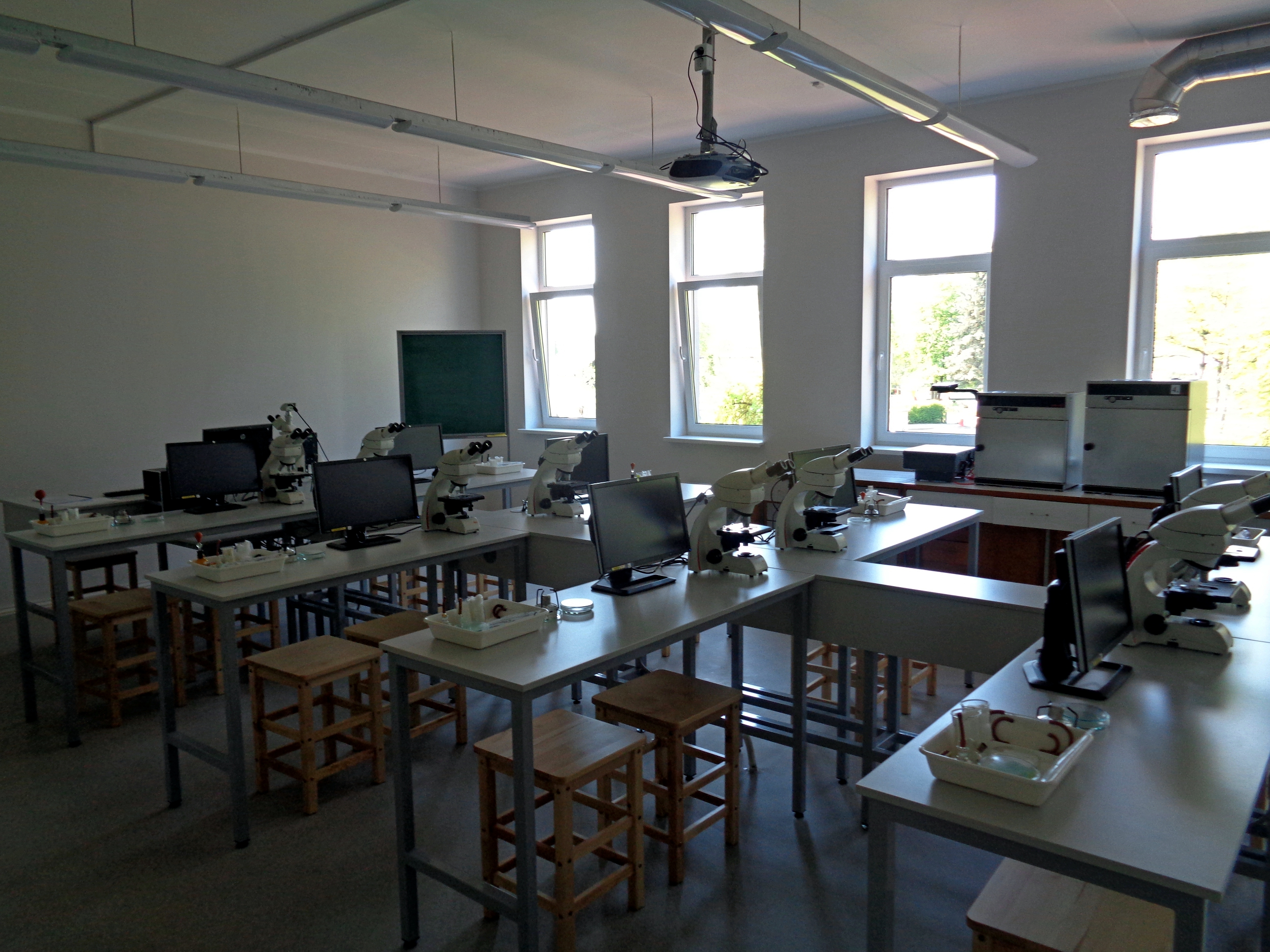
Food microbiology laboratory at the Faculty of Food Technology, Latvia University of Life Sciences and Technologies.

The branches of microbiology can be classified into pure and applied sciences. Microbiology can be also classified based on taxonomy, in the cases of bacteriology, mycology, protozoology, and phycology. There is considerable overlap between the specific branches of microbiology with each other and with other disciplines, and certain aspects of these branches can extend beyond the traditional scope of microbiology In general the field of microbiology can be divided in the more fundamental branch (pure microbiology) and the applied microbiology (biotechnology). In the more fundamental field the organisms are studied as the subject itself on a deeper (theoretical) level. Applied microbiology refers to the fields where the micro-organisms are applied in certain processes such as brewing or fermentation. The organisms itself are often not studied as such, but applied to sustain certain processes.

== Pure microbiology ==
- Bacteriology: the study of bacteria
- Mycology: the study of fungi
- Protozoology: the study of protozoa
- Phycology/algology: the study of algae
- Parasitology: the study of parasites
- Immunology: the study of the immune system
- Virology: the study of viruses
- Nematology: the study of nematodes
- Microbial cytology: the study of microscopic and submicroscopic details of microorganisms
- Microbial physiology: the study of how the microbial cell functions biochemically. Includes the study of microbial growth, microbial metabolism and microbial cell structure
- Microbial pathogenesis: the study of pathogens which happen to be microbes
- Microbial ecology: the relationship between microorganisms and their environment
- Microbial genetics: the study of how genes are organized and regulated in microbes in relation to their cellular functions Closely related to the field of molecular biology
- Cellular microbiology: a discipline bridging microbiology and cell biology
- Evolutionary microbiology: the study of the evolution of microbes. This field can be subdivided into:
  - Microbial taxonomy: the naming and classification of microorganisms
    - Bacterial taxonomy: the naming and classification of bacteria
  - Microbial systematics: the study of the diversity and genetic relationship of microorganisms
  - Microbial phylogenetics: the study of the manner in which various groups of microorganisms are genetically related
  - Bacterial phylodynamics: the study of immunology, epidemiology, and phylogenetics of bacterial pathogens to better understand their evolutionary role
  - Viral phylodynamics: the study of how epidemiological, immunological, and evolutionary processes act and potentially interact to shape viral phylogenies
- Generation microbiology: the study of those microorganisms that have the same characters as their parents
- Systems microbiology: a discipline bridging systems biology and microbiology.
- Molecular microbiology: the study of the molecular principles of the physiological processes in microorganisms

=== Other ===
- Astro microbiology: the study of microorganisms in outer space
- Biological agent: the study of those microorganisms which are being used in weapon industries.
- Nano microbiology: the study of those microscopic organisms on nano level.
- Predictive microbiology: the quantification of relations between controlling factors in foods and responses of pathogenic and spoilage microorganisms using mathematical modelling

== Applied microbiology ==
- Medical microbiology: the study of the pathogenic microbes and the role of microbes in human illness. Includes the study of microbial pathogenesis and epidemiology and is related to the study of disease pathology and immunology. This area of microbiology also covers the study of human microbiota, cancer, and the tumor microenvironment.
- Pharmaceutical microbiology: the study of microorganisms that are related to the production of antibiotics, enzymes, vitamins, vaccines, and other pharmaceutical products and that cause pharmaceutical contamination and spoil.
- Industrial microbiology: the exploitation of microbes for use in industrial processes. Examples include industrial fermentation and wastewater treatment. Closely linked to the biotechnology industry. This field also includes brewing, an important application of microbiology.
- Microbial biotechnology: the manipulation of microorganisms at the genetic and molecular level to generate useful products.
- Food microbiology: the study of microorganisms causing food spoilage and foodborne illness. Using microorganisms to produce foods, for example by fermentation.
- Agricultural microbiology: the study of agriculturally relevant microorganisms. This field can be further classified into the following:
  - Plant microbiology and Plant pathology: The study of the interactions between microorganisms and plants and plant pathogens.
  - Soil microbiology: the study of those microorganisms that are found in soil.
- Veterinary microbiology: the study of the role of microbes in veterinary medicine or animal taxonomy.
- Environmental microbiology: the study of the function and diversity of microbes in their natural environments. This involves the characterization of key bacterial habitats such as the rhizosphere and phyllosphere, soil and groundwater ecosystems, open oceans or extreme environments (extremophiles). This field includes other branches of microbiology such as:
  - Microbial ecology
  - Microbially mediated nutrient cycling
  - Geomicrobiology
  - Microbial diversity
  - Bioremediation: use of micro-organisms to clean air, water and soils.
- Water microbiology (or aquatic microbiology): The study of those microorganisms that are found in water.
- Aeromicrobiology (or air microbiology): The study of airborne microorganisms.
- Biotechnology: related to recombinant DNA technology or genetic engineering.
