= Olley =

Olley may refer to:

== People ==
- Chris Olley, English artist
- Frank Olley (1927–1988), Australian politician
- Gordon Olley (1893–1958), English flying ace
- Greg Olley (born 1996), English football player
- Jonathan Olley (born 1967), British photographer
- June Norma Olley (1924–2019), British-born Australian seafood technologist
- Ken Olley, New Zealand football player
- Margaret Olley (1923–2011), Australian painter
- Martin Olley (born 1963), English cricket player
- Michelle Olley, British writer, journalist and magazine and book editor
- Robert Olley (born 1940), English artist

== Places ==
- Olley, Meurthe-et-Moselle, France

== Other ==
- 'Olley v Marlborough Court Ltd, 1949 English contract law case
