= Goodwin Procter =

American law firm

Goodwin Procter LLP
- Headquarters: Boston, Massachusetts, U.S.
- No. of offices: 16
- No. of attorneys: ~1800
- No. of employees: ~2800
- Major practice areas: General practice
- Key people: Anthony J. McCusker (Chairman); Mark Bettencourt (Managing partner)
- Revenue: ▲$2.244 billion USD (2023)
- Profit per equity partner: ▲$3.69 million USD (2021)
- Date founded: 1912
- Founders: Robert Goodwin and Joseph Procter
- Company type: Limited liability partnership
- Website: www.goodwinlaw.com

Goodwin Procter LLP is an American multinational law firm. It is one of the largest law firms in the world as measured by revenue and consists of more than 1,800 lawyers across offices in Boston, Cambridge, Frankfurt, Munich, Hong Kong, London, Los Angeles, Luxembourg, New York City, Paris, Philadelphia, Santa Monica, Silicon Valley, San Francisco, Singapore, and Washington, D.C.

Goodwin has about 2,800 employees worldwide in 2026. It focuses on complex transactional work, high-stakes litigation and advisory services in matters involving financial institutions, intellectual property, private equity, real estate capital markets, securities litigation, white collar defense, technology and life sciences.

== History ==
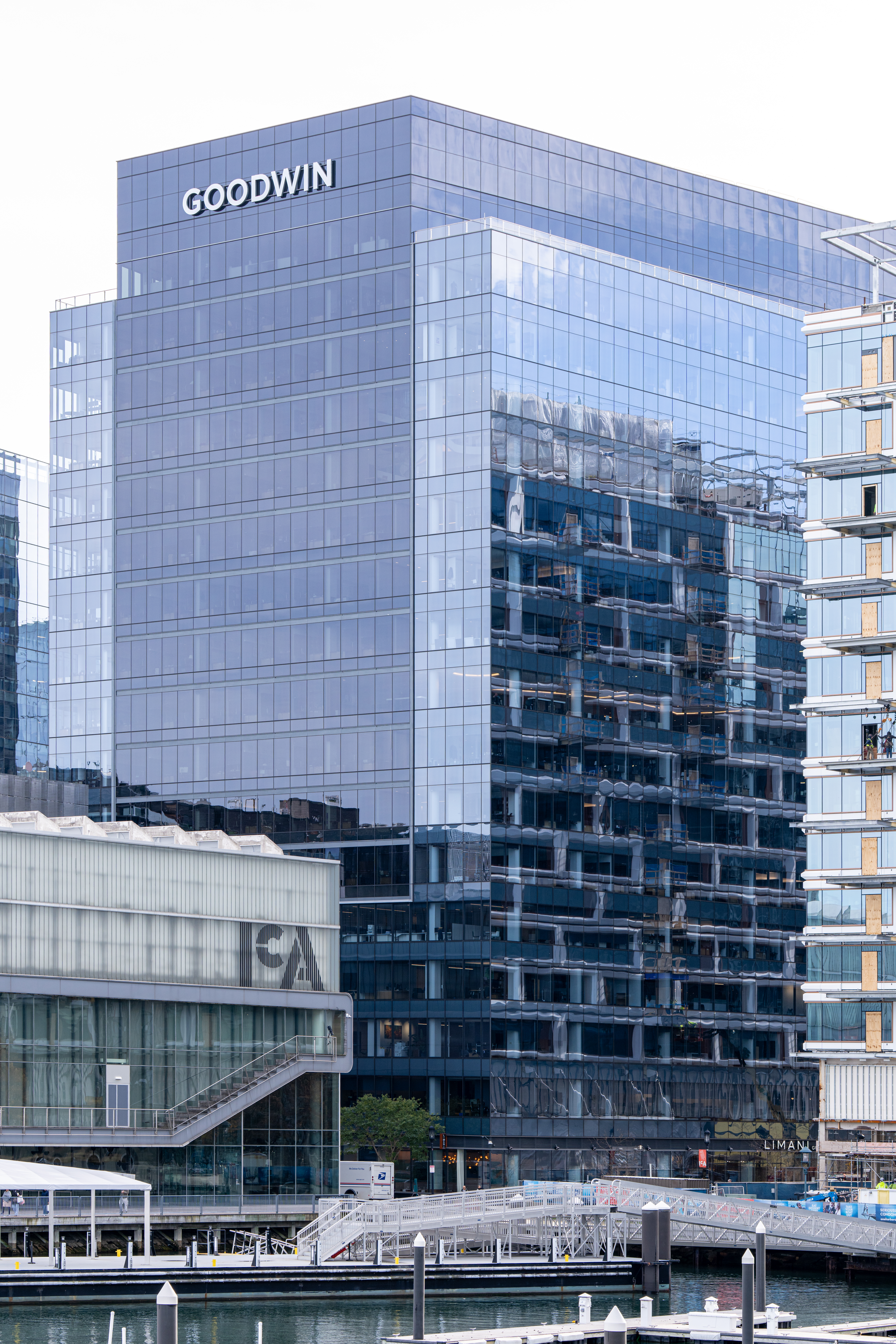
Goodwin's office in Boston's Seaport District

In 1912, lawyers and former Harvard classmates Robert Eliot Goodwin and Joseph Osborne Procter, Jr. ran into each other on the street and decided to start their own law firm, Goodwin & Procter, which opened its offices on July 1 that year at 84 State Street in Boston. That winter, Robert Goodwin and Amos Taylor represented Mary Newell against the Oceanic Steam Navigation Company for the sum of $110,400 resulting from the April 15, 1912 sinking of the RMS Titanic. Another case taken on in the firm's early days stemmed from the infamous pyramid scheme orchestrated in Boston by Charles Ponzi. After the scheme was exposed as fraud, Robert Goodwin served as the bankruptcy referee for Middlesex County amid thousands of recovery claims in the bankruptcy courts. When the United States joined the allied cause in World War I in 1917, Robert Goodwin joined the country's vanguard deployment in France, eventually rising to the rank of colonel and assuming command of the 101st Field Artillery. After the campaign, he was awarded the Distinguished Service Medal. Not long after, Samuel Hoar V, a litigator, was hired, followed by Fred Tarbell Field, a well-respected tax lawyer who was a friend of Procter's, and the firm became known as Goodwin, Procter, Field & Hoar. In early 1929, Field was appointed a justice of the Supreme Judicial Court of Massachusetts (and would later become its Chief Justice), and the firm was renamed Goodwin, Procter & Hoar, a name it would retain for the next 72 years. The Depression years proved pivotal for the firm's future diversification and growth. Liquidation cases, including the unwinding of the Boston Continental Bank, provided a surge of business, as did the proliferation of federal agencies and regulations brought on by the New Deal. Around the same time, Greater Boston's manufacturing and maritime industries faded and the financial management industry expanded, presenting new opportunities for work on highly complex financial transactions.

Goodwin Procter also undertook matters involving public service and public policy, including public investigations of corruption and malfeasance, as well as cases with constitutional overtones. When the Massachusetts governor pardoned New England Mafia boss Raymond Patriarca in 1938, the resulting public furor led the Legislature to establish a commission to investigate the state's pardon and parole procedures. Sam Hoar, with Don Hurley as his lieutenant, headed the commission, whose resulting investigation led to reform of the pardon laws and impeachment of a member of the Governor's Council. More than 70 years later, the Commonwealth would once again call on Goodwin Procter lawyers to examine alleged corruption in the state's parole office.

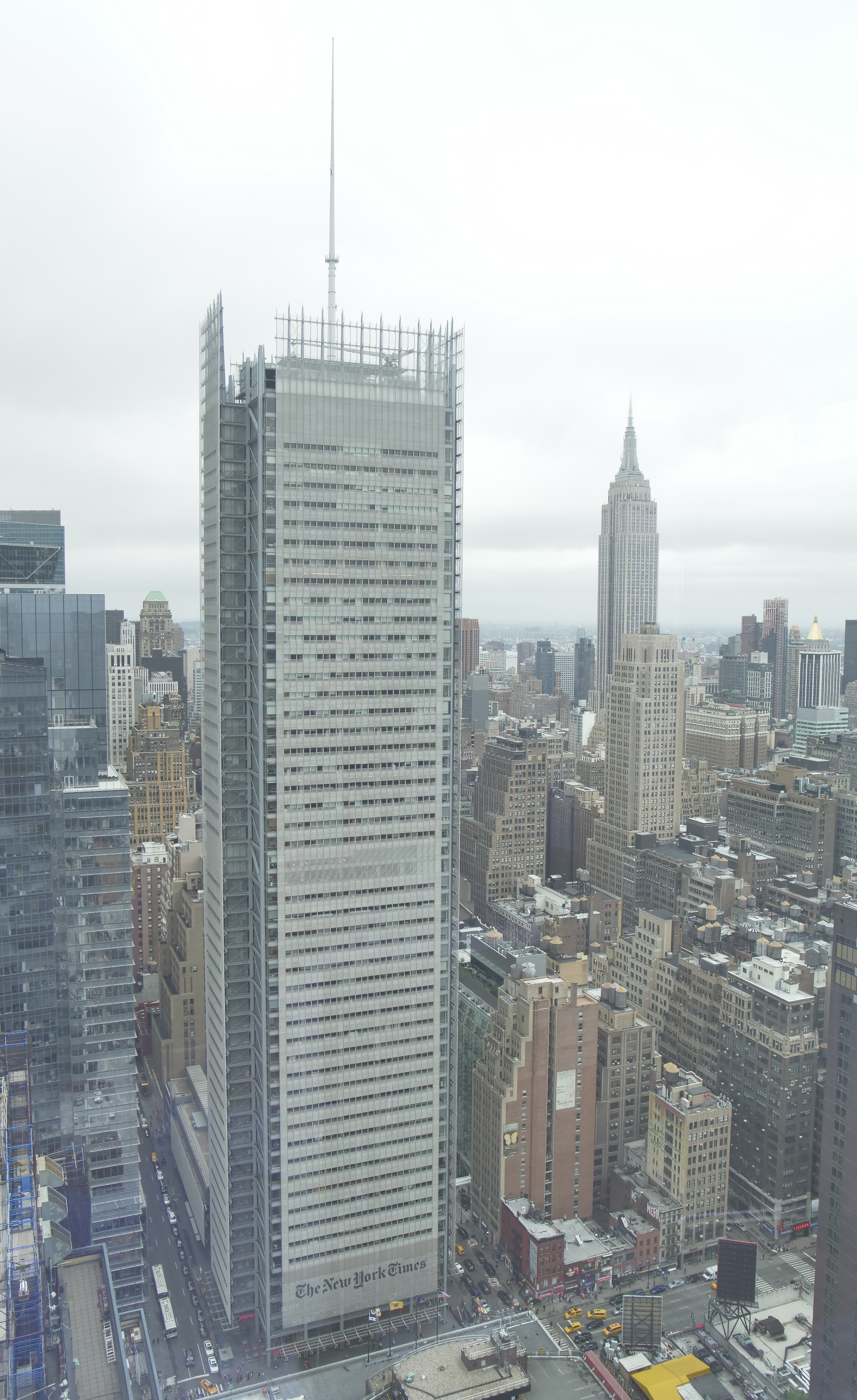
Goodwin's offices at the New York Times Building

After World War II, partners Leonard Wheeler and Frank Wallis played instrumental roles in the historic Nuremberg Trials, presenting much of the Americans' case against the Nazis. After the war, Robert Goodwin entered semi-retirement and Sam Hoar died in 1952. Goodwin formally retired in 1963, ending a 60-year legal career; he died in 1971.

In 1960, tax partners Allan Higgins and Charlie Post helped draft and secure passage of the Real Estate Investment Trust Act, which was hailed as a significant catalyst for real estate development across the country. In 1963, partner Don Hurley played a role in conceiving, drafting and securing passage of an amendment to the Bank Holding Company Act exempting parent companies of single banks and non-banking subsidiaries from federal restrictions on commercial banks.

In 1969, after more than a half-century in the India Building at 84 State Street, the firm moved to a new office tower at 28 State, where it would remain for 16 years before moving to Exchange Place at 53 State Street in 1985. To celebrate its 75th anniversary in 1987, the firm made a donation of $1 million to the City of Boston to fund initiatives in public education. The donation, called SEED (Support for Early Educational Development), was made up entirely of individual contributions by the firm's partners.

With 280 lawyers, Goodwin Procter entered the 1990s as the “largest law firm under one roof in the country,” according to Massachusetts Lawyers Weekly. The firm made its first foray outside Boston in 1994 with an office in Washington, D.C., followed by one in New York in 1997. The acquisition of 27 lawyers from a northern New Jersey firm and 13 litigators from a New York products liability shop bolstered the firm's IP and litigation practices in New York.

In 1998, Regina Pisa became the first woman to be named chairman and Managing Partner of an AmLaw 100 firm. Under Pisa's leadership, Goodwin grew from 300 lawyers primarily in Boston to more than 900 lawyers serving clients from eight locations in the United States, Europe and Asia. In 2004, the firm merged with the Washington, D.C.–based litigation and regulatory mid-sized firm Shea & Gardner. The following year over 60 attorneys from Testa, Hurwitz & Thibeault joined Goodwin Procter as Testa Hurwitz dissolved, a move the Boston Globe called possibly "the biggest coup in Boston legal history." Goodwin first established its West Coast presence in 2006, opening offices in Los Angeles and San Francisco. It launched its Silicon Valley presence in 2007. The firm went global in 2008 with offices in London (Goodwin's first European location) and Hong Kong.

At its century mark in 2012, Goodwin had 850 lawyers and another 720 professional staff serving clients from offices in the United States, Europe and Asia. As part of its centennial celebrations, the firm started its Annual Days of Service tradition, during which employees in each office give back to their communities. In 2015, Goodwin announced the opening of an office in Frankfurt, Germany. In April 2016, Goodwin opened its third European office in Paris, France. Later that year, the firm moved its Boston home to 100 Northern Avenue in the city's Seaport District after more than 100 years at the corner of State and Congress Streets. Two years later, Goodwin announced a significant expansion of its European Private Equity and Private Investment Funds practices with a group comprising the bulk of the market-leading and former SJ Berwin investment funds team. In 2019, Goodwin opened new offices in Santa Monica, Luxembourg and Cambridge. In April 2022, Goodwin continued expanding its European operations by opening a second German office in Munich. Goodwin's Singapore office, opened in October 2022, marked the firm's second location in Asia. In January 2023, the firm opened an office in Philadelphia.

In 2025, the firm announced it would be closing its office in Frankfurt. In the same year, the firm had record breaking revenue of $2.7 billion due to its mergers and acquisitions litigation work.

In April 2026, USA v. Fejal, et al revealed that a former law associate, who had been fired by the firm in 2023, was indicted, with 29 others, for insider trading in January 2026, after leading a scheme orchestrated over decades by a network that included some of his former Yale classmates. The indictment was released in May, in which prosecutors characterized affected law firms as victims of those charged.

== Clients ==
- Japan's Kyowa Kirin acquired Orchard Therapeutics for $477.6 million. Goodwin advised the British biopharmaceutical company in the deal.
- The firm advised OpenAI on its fundraising efforts.
- In 2025, Goodwin Procter represented the town of Milton, Massachusetts when the town was sued by the state of Massachusetts for refusing to comply with Massachusetts state law to allow multi-family housing near public transit stations.

== Recognition ==
Goodwin ranked 17th on the American Lawyer’s annual ranking of U.S. law firms by gross revenue in 2022, and its lawyers and practice groups are consistently recognized by Chambers, U.S. News & World Report and Legal 500.

== See also ==
- List of largest United States-based law firms by profits per partner
