= Antonio Joseph =

Antonio Joseph is the name of:

- Antonio Joseph (artist) (1921–2016), Haitian artist
- Antonio Joseph (politician) (1846–1910), delegate from the Territory of New Mexico
