= Albert Henderson =

Albert Henderson may refer to:

- Albert Henderson (soccer) (1881–1947), Canadian amateur football (soccer) player
- Albert Henderson (actor) (1915–2004), American actor
- Albert H. Henderson (1893–1951), American lawyer, politician, and judge from New York
- Albert John Henderson (1920–1999), U.S. federal judge

== See also ==
- Bert Henderson (disambiguation)
