= Amelia Kajumulo Kavaisi =

Tanzanian microbiologist

- Born: Amelia Kajumulo Kavaisi
- Occupation: Lecture at university of Dar es Salaam
- Known for: Mushroom Plantation in Tanzania

Amelia Kajumulo Kavaisi is a retired Professor of Applied Microbiology.

== Work ==
This is a list of some of the various surveys and work done by Kavaisi:

- Use of industrial waste
- Food security and entrepreneurship
- Non-green revolution
- Mushroom cultivation soil
- Tanzanian Sector Sector: Investigations and behavior after harvest of mangrove as a biological remedy
- Production of Oxidative and Hydrolytic enzymes by means of Coprinus cinereus (Schaeff). Ashes from manure residue mixed with cow dung

She is also responsible for providing references and edits to other studies conducted outside Tanzania.

== Books ==
This is a list of various books written by Kavaisi:

- Mushroom Plantation in Tanzania
