= Gamma Eta Gamma =

Professional law fraternity

- ΓΗΓ
- Founded: February 25, 1901; 125 years ago University of Maine School of Law
- Type: Professional
- Affiliation: Independent
- Former affiliation: PIC
- Status: Active
- Emphasis: Law
- Scope: Local (previously National)
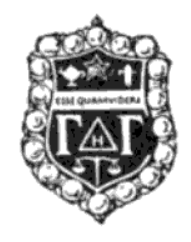
- Member badge
- Colors: Red and Black
- Symbol: Lamp, Star, Fasces, Balance
- Publication: The Rescript
- Chapters: 33 chartered, 1 active
- Members: ~10,000 active
- Headquarters: 1126 5th Street SE; Minneapolis, Minnesota 55414; United States

Gamma Eta Gamma (ΓΗΓ) is a co-ed professional law fraternity that was a member of the Professional Fraternity Association. Chapters are limited to law schools on the approved list of the American Bar Association.

== History ==
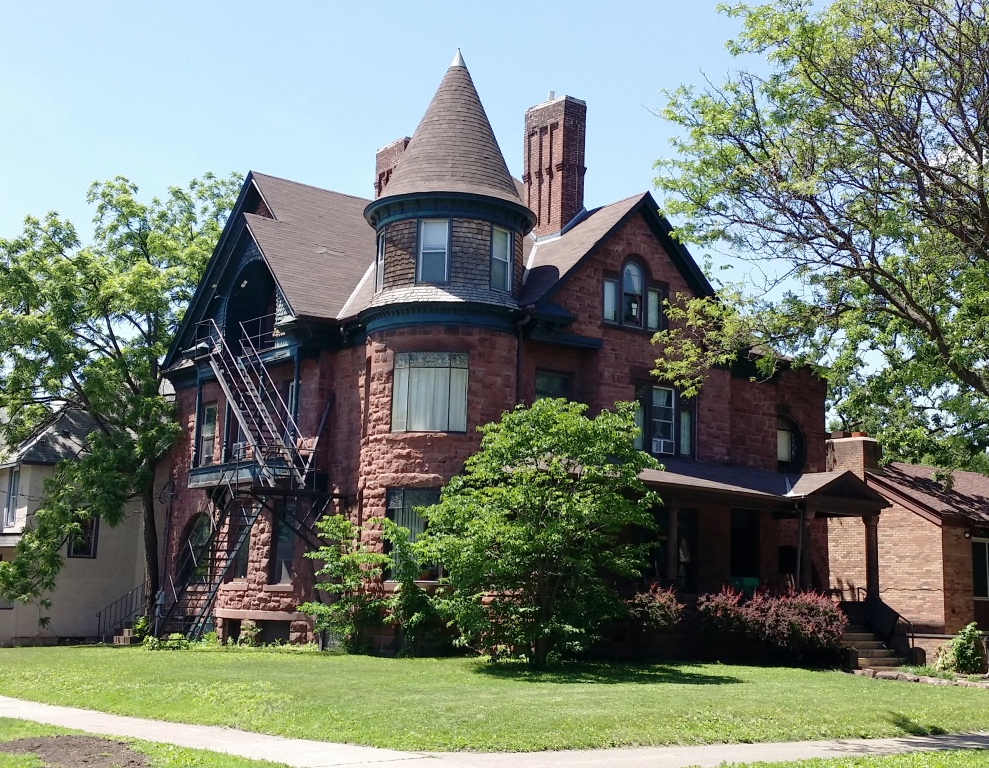
University of Minnesota Law School chapter house, 2014

Gamma Eta Gamma was founded on February 25, 1901, at the University of Maine School of Law as a law fraternity for men. Its founders were Charles Vey Holman, Charles Hickson Reid Jr., and Harold Dudley Greeley.

From the beginning, the fraternity exhorted its members to a high degree of personal and professional conduct. At its founding, the three men who established the Fraternity wrote in their handwriting into the preamble of its constitution:

"We the undersigned students of the Law School of the University of Maine, with a view of establishing on this and other schools of law, as well as in the general practice of the profession, an elevated standard of personal deportment, a high code of professional ethics and a broad and catholic development of mental culture and moral character do associate ourselves in the lasting bonds of a fraternal union under the name of Gamma Eta Gamma."

Its officers were chancellor, proctor, judge, lictor, sheriff, quaestor, recorder, bailiff, and tipstave. The pledge manual included chapters on how to study law effectively, a chapter on etiquette, and general fraternity information.

The Gamma Eta Gamma annual convention called a Witan, was first held on May 29, 1901. Later, the convention shifted to a biennial basis, with province conferences held in off years. The Beta chapter was installed at the Boston University School of Law on May 24, 1902.

Gamma Eta Gamma published a songbook in 1909 and 1915. In 1912, the fraternity started publishing an annual called The Rescript; it became a semi-annual and, later, quarterly in 1920. Also in 1912, the chapters at Albany and Cornell owned a chapter house, while the chapters at Boston, Creighton, and Indiana rented houses.

By 1976 it had granted 33 charters with a national roster of over 7,000 initiates. By 2017, there was one remaining active chapter, the University of Minnesota Law School in Minneapolis, which is coed. It provides low-cost housing for law students in a Richardsonian Romanesque style house that was built in 1892.

== Traditions and insignia ==
Founders' Day is generally held on the founding anniversary, February 25. However, some chapters celebrated the Prandium Cancellari on June 7, the date of the fraternity's first banquet in 1901.

The fraternity's badge is a shield with a lamp, a star, and a Roman fasces or bundle, above the motto. A triangle encloses the letter Π with Γ on both sides and below a balance. The official badge contains 20 pearls surrounding the shield. The outgoing president or high chancellor is awarded a badge with a diamond border.

The pledge pin is a circular button, with the letters Γ Η Γ appearing in a circle on a red field, imposed on a triangle, with the rest of the button in black. There is a fasces key, in gold, for alumni who graduated with a law degree, with the letters of the Fraternity name on the face of the key. The colors of the fraternity are red and black.

== Governance ==
While the fraternity had multiple chapters, a council of twelve members called the Curia managed the fraternity between conventions. The Curia consists of four elective executive officers and officials from the eight provinces of the fraternity. Eight of these twelve leaders were required to be alumni.

Governance is now held by the University of Minnesota Law School chapter which operates as an informal, local fraternity.

== Chapters ==
Following is a list of Gamma Eta Gamma chapters. Inactive groups indicated by italics, the active chapter in bold.

Chapter	Charter date and range	Institution	Location	Status	Ref.
Alpha	February 26, 1901 – 1910	University of Maine School of Law	Portland, Maine	Inactive	(Note: Chapter's charter was withdrawn due to low membership at the University of Maine's law school, resulting in a loss of state funding.)
Beta	May 24, 1902 – 1917	Boston University School of Law	Boston, Massachusetts	Inactive	(Note: Chapter closed during World War I and was not reformed.)
Gamma	February 20, 1904 – xxxx ?	Albany Law School	Albany, New York	Inactive	
Delta	1908–1932	Syracuse University College of Law	Syracuse, New York	Inactive	
Epsilon	1909–1918	Cornell Law School	Ithaca, New York	Inactive	
Zeta	1911–1929	University of Michigan Law School	Ann Arbor, Michigan	Inactive	
Eta	June 15, 1911 – xxxx ?	Indiana University Maurer School of Law	Bloomington, Indiana	Inactive	
Theta	April 10, 1912 – xxxx ?	Creighton University School of Law	Omaha, Nebraska	Inactive	(Note: Chapter formed by absorbing the Bachelors Club.)
Iota	February 27, 1914 – xxxx ?	Georgetown University Law Center	Washington, D.C.	Inactive	
Kappa	1915–1917	University of Oregon School of Law	Eugene, Oregon	Inactive	
Lambda	1919–xxxx ?	Northwestern University Pritzker School of Law	Chicago, Illinois	Inactive	
Mu	1919–xxxx ?	University of Detroit Mercy School of Law	Detroit, Michigan	Inactive	
Nu	1920–xxxx ?	University of Chicago Law School	Chicago, Illinois	Inactive	
Xi	1920–xxxx ?	Fordham University School of Law	Manhattan, New York City, New York	Inactive	
Omicron	1920–xxxx ?	University of Maryland Francis King Carey School of Law	Baltimore, Maryland	Inactive	
Pi	1921–1931	University of Illinois College of Law	Champaign, Illinois	Inactive	
Rho	1922–xxxx ?	Ohio State University Moritz College of Law	Columbus, Ohio	Inactive	
Sigma	1922–xxxx ?	USC Gould School of Law	Los Angeles, California	Inactive	
Tau	1922–1928	Vanderbilt University	Nashville, Tennessee	Inactive	
Upsilon	1923–xxxx ?	University of Wisconsin–Madison	Madison, Wisconsin	Inactive	
Phi	1923–xxxx ?	University of Iowa	Iowa City, Iowa	Inactive	
**Chi**	1924	University of Minnesota Law School	Minneapolis, Minnesota	Active	
Omega	1925–1929	Washington University in St. Louis	St. Louis County, Missouri	Inactive	
Beta Gamma	1927–xxxx ?	Wake Forest University	Winston-Salem, North Carolina	Inactive	
Beta Delta	1929–xxxx ?	Duke University	Durham, North Carolina	Inactive	
Beta Epsilon	1930–xxxx ?	Louisiana State University	Baton Rouge, Louisiana	Inactive	
Beta Zeta	1930–1932	Case Western Reserve University	Cleveland, Ohio	Inactive	
Beta Eta	1931–xxxx ?	George Washington University	Washington, D.C.	Inactive	
Beta Kappa	1931–xxxx ?	Catholic University	Washington, D.C.	Inactive	
Beta Theta	1931–xxxx ?	Santa Clara University School of Law	Santa Clara, California	Inactive	
Beta Mu	1934–xxxx ?	DePaul University	Chicago, Illinois	Inactive	
Beta Nu	1950–xxxx ?	University of Virginia	Charlottesville, Virginia	Inactive	

== Notable members ==
Name	Chapter	Notability	Ref.
W. Russell Arrington	Pi	attorney, Illinois House of Representatives, and Illinois State Senate	
John L. Bates	Alpha honorary	Governor of Massachusetts, lawyer	
John B. Bennett		attorney and United States House of Representatives	
Homer Bone		attorney, U.S. Senator, United States circuit judge	
Thomas Leo Brown	Beta Kappa	politician and United States circuit judge	
Heriot Clarkson		justice of the North Carolina Supreme Court	
Warren A. Cole	Beta	Businessman and lawyer	
Edward Matthew Curran		United States district judge	
Joseph Dainow	Beta Epsilon	professor of law at Louisiana State University	
L. B. Day	Theta	justice of the Nebraska Supreme Court	
Lucilius A. Emery	Alpha honorary	justice of the Maine Supreme Judicial Court	
Michael Fansler		justice of the Indiana Supreme Court	
George S. Fitzgerald		Attorney and politician	
John H. Gillis		judge	
Martin H. Glenn	Gamma honorary	Governor of New York	
William H. Hampton	Delta	lawyer, politician, and U.S. Commissioner	
Albert H. Henderson	Epsilon	lawyer, New York State Assembly, and Surrogate of Bronx County	
Sveinbjorn Johnson		attorney general of North Dakota	
Harold LeVander	Chi	Governor of Minnesota	
Richard J. McCormick		lawyer and Massachusetts State House of Representatives	
Francis M. McKeown		lawyer and Massachusetts State Senate	
Frank Murphy	Mu	Lieutenant governor of Michigan	
Daniel J. O'Mara	Delta	New York State Assembly and Justice of New York Supreme Court	
Samuel E. Pingree	Alpha honorary	Governor of Vermont	
Harold M. Ryan	Mu	circuit judge, United States House of Representatives, and Michigan Senate	
Al Smith	Gamma honorary	Governor of New York	
James C. Soper	Pi	Illinois Senate	
Albert Spear	Alpha honorary	Chief Justice of the Maine Supreme Judicial Court and president of the Maine Senate	
Harold Stassen	Chi	president of the University of Pennsylvania and governor of Minnesota	
Melvin D. Synhorst		Iowa Secretary of State	
Amos Taylor	Beta	Attorneyf and politician	
Andrew P. Wiswell	Alpha honorary	justice of the Maine Supreme Judicial Court	
