= Bogardus =

Bogardus is a surname. Notable people with the surname include:

- Abraham Bogardus (1822–1908), American daguerreotypist and photographer
- Adam Bogardus (1834–1913), American trap shooter
- Charles Bogardus (1841–1929), American politician, Union Army colonel, farmer and businessman
- Edgar Bogardus (1927–1958), American poet
- Elizabeth Carter Bogardus (1895–1928) Hawaiian and American founder of the Junior League of Honolulu
- Emory S. Bogardus (1882–1973), American sociologist
- Everardus Bogardus (1607–1647), Dutch Reformed Church clergyman in the New Netherland (North America)
- James Bogardus (1800–1874), American inventor and architect
- Robert Bogardus (1771–1841), American politician and general
- Rose Bogardus (fl. 1987–?), American politician
- Stephen Bogardus (born 1954), American actor
