= Ernest Corominas =

Spanish-French mathematician

- Born: 1913; Barcelona, Spain
- Died: 24 January 1992; Lyon, France
- Education: University of Paris; University of Barcelona
- Scientific career
- Fields: Mathematics
- Workplaces: University of Lyon
- Doctoral advisor: Arnaud Denjoy
- Doctoral students: Robert Bonnet; Maurice Pouzet

Ernest Corominas i Vigneaux (1913 – 24 January 1992) was a Spanish-French mathematician.

Born in Barcelona, he studied architecture and mathematics at the University of Barcelona, graduating in 1936. He served as in officer of engineering in the Spanish Republican Army during the Spanish Civil War. In 1939 he fled to France, before moving to South America in 1940. After working six months as an architect in Chile, he moved to Argentina, where Julio Rey Pastor offered him a lecturer position at the University of Buenos Aires.

Corominas returned to Europe, where he attained his doctorate at the University of Paris in 1952, under the supervision of Arnaud Denjoy. He then lectured in Barcelona, Princeton, and Caracas, before settling in France at the University of Lyon. In 1966, Corominas became a French citizen.

He was awarded a Guggenheim Fellowship in 1953.
