= Joseph Dainow =

American lawyer

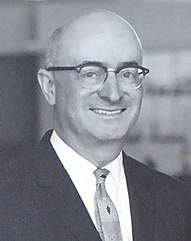
- Dainow in 1964
- Born: June 5, 1906; Montreal, Quebec
- Died: March 17, 1978 (aged 71)
- Education: McGill University; University of Dijon; Northwestern University

Joseph Dainow (1906–1978) was a Canadian-American professor of law. He was born and grew up in Montreal, Canada, and received a law degree from McGill University but spent most of his life in Baton Rouge, Louisiana, where he was professor of law at Louisiana State University.

Dainow was the founding editor of the Louisiana Law Review that began publishing several issues per year in 1938.

He was the chief reporter for the Compiled Edition of the Civil Code of Louisiana, an important work published in 1940 with several updates over the years, that was the starting point for any major research into Louisiana civil law.

During World War II, Major Joseph Dainow served in the Judge Advocate General's Corps, United States Army. In 1945 he prepared research materials for use in the Nuremberg Trials and went to Nuremberg as a member of the legal staff of the American prosecution team.

Dainow was a member of the editorial board of the American Journal of Comparative Law and an active member of many national and international learned societies and organizations.

He published over 300 works that are in over 1,000 libraries.

== Biography ==
Joseph Dainow was born in Montreal, Quebec on July 5, 1906 to Aaron and Pearl (Sourkes) Dainow. He was the oldest of four children; Joseph, Helen, Henry and Sylvia. He grew up in the area of the city where many immigrant Jews first settled, an area that was featured in many stories written by the well-known Canadian author Mordecai Richler. He went to McGill University in Montreal, completing an undergraduate B.A. degree in 1926. He continued at McGill for a law degree which he received in 1929. In 1933 Joseph Dainow married Frieda Fineman. In 1935 they moved to Louisiana. They had two children, Jariel David and Keren Judith.

== Law school ==
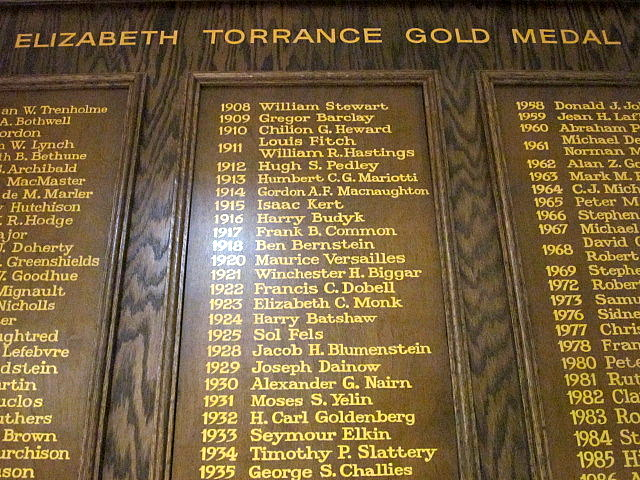
Gold Medal board in the McGill Law School listing the leading student for each year.

Dainow applied to the McGill Law School and was accepted, in spite of the strict quotas for Jews in effect at McGill at the time. He received the B.C.L. degree (Bachelor of Civil Law) from McGill in 1929, and as the leading student, was awarded the Gold Medal. Dainow went on to work on a PhD in law at the University of Dijon in France and in 1931 he received the degree Docteur en Droit.

== Law career ==
From 1931 to 1932, Dainow was a lecturer in Roman law at McGill University. Following this he was in private law practice in Montreal, but he was a scholar and wanted to pursue an academic career of research and teaching. In 1933 he continued his studies by going to Northwestern University where he received an S.J.D. degree (Doctor of Juridical Science) in 1938.

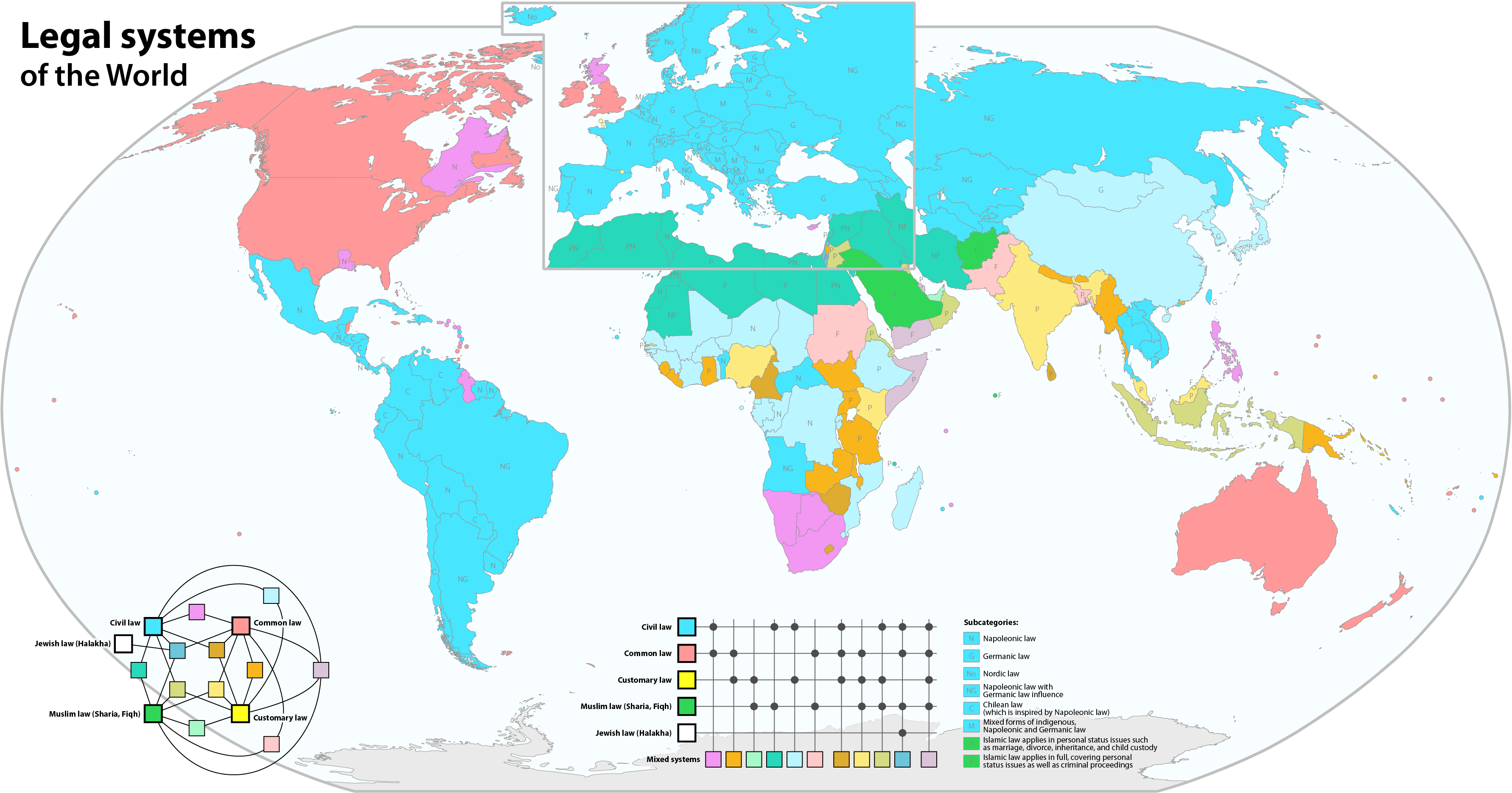
Legal systems of the world.

As a scholar in the civil law, there were not a lot of opportunities for a university position in the U.S. and Canada. While most of Europe and the rest of the world had legal systems based on civil law, in North America only Quebec and Louisiana used the civil law. Civil law is based on comprehensive, continuously updated legal codes that specify all matters that can be brought before a court. The rest of the U.S. and Canada used the common law, which was based on the English legal system of case law where the law is based on prior judicial decisions of the courts.

A number of professors at Northwestern urged Dainow to consider Louisiana, as it would provide an opportunity to fully utilize his background and training in the civil law. In 1935 Dainow and his wife moved to New Orleans, Louisiana and he became professor of law at Loyola University. In 1938 he left Loyola to become an assistant professor of law at Louisiana State University in Baton Rouge, Louisiana. Dainow remained at LSU for the rest of his career, becoming an associate professor in 1942, professor in 1947, and professor emeritus in 1973.

Dainow traveled widely as a lecturer and visiting professor. He was a visiting professor of law at the University of Puerto Rico in 1950, Northwestern University in 1956, University of Texas in 1957, University of Michigan in 1958, and New York University in 1959.

He was awarded a Guggenheim Fellowship in 1953 and he was a Fulbright lecturer at the University of Paris and the University of Lyon in 1954 and at the University of Ghent in 1962-1963.

== World War II ==
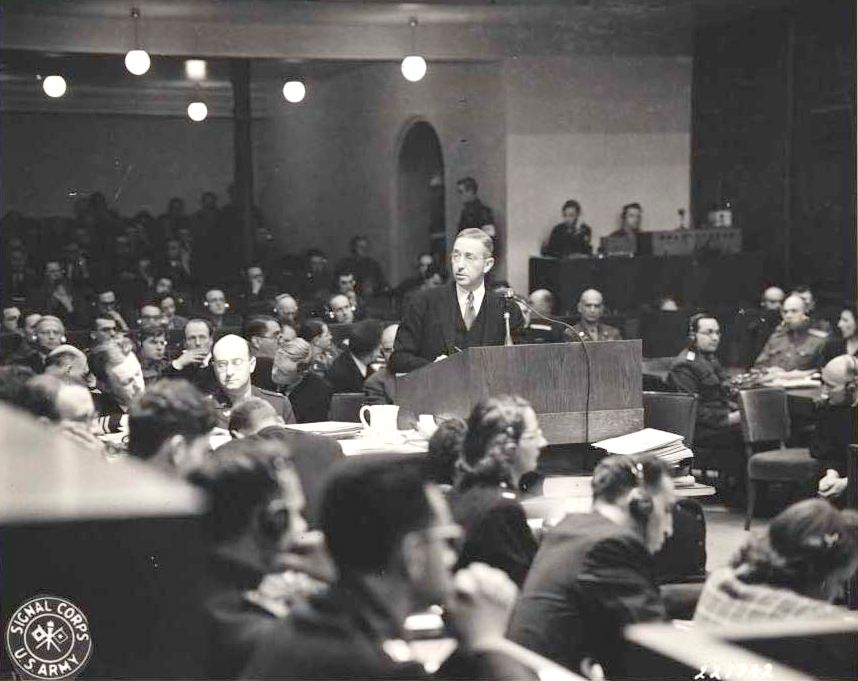
Joseph Dainow at Nuremberg, Sidney Alderman at the podium. Nov 27, 1945

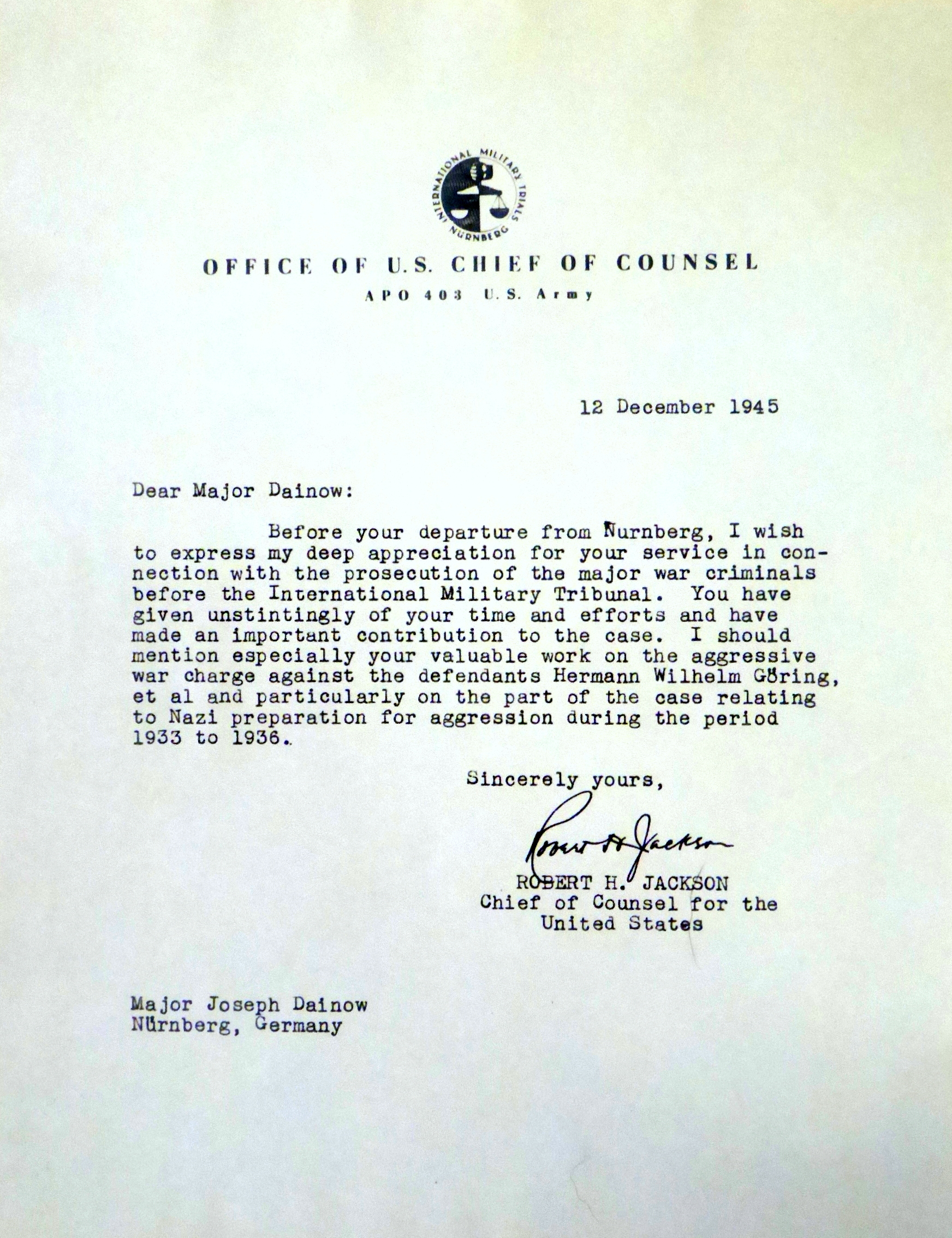
Letter from Robert H. Jackson.

Dainow served from 1942 to 1946 in the Judge Advocate General's Corps, United States Army. He was the chief of the Research Branch in Washington, in charge of research facilities and publications including Military Laws of the United States and the monthly bulletin.

In 1945, Robert H. Jackson was absent from the Supreme Court to be U.S. Chief of Counsel for the prosecution of Nazi war criminals at the Nuremberg Trials. Dainow went to Nuremberg as a member of the legal staff of the American prosecution team. He prepared evidentiary materials that were used in the trial before the International Military Commission. His trial brief "1933-1936 Preparation for Aggression" assembled evidence showing that Nazi conspirators decided "the Treaty of Versailles must definitely be abrogated and specific plans were made by them and put into operation by 7th March, 1936."

On Nov 27, 1945, the sixth day, Dainow appeared in court as the assistant to Associate Trial Counsel Sidney S. Alderman. On December 10, 1945, Alderman concluded his presentation on "Aggressive War" by saying, "I hope the Tribunal will allow me to express my deep sense of obligation to Commander Sidney J. Kaplan, section chief, and to the members of his staff, who did the yeoman work necessary to assemble and prepare these materials that I have presented. These members of that stay, in the order in which the materials were presented, are: Major Joseph Dainow, ..."

Before Major Dainow left Nuremberg, he received a personalized letter from Robert H. Jackson thanking him for his "important contribution to the case".

== Scholarly accomplishments ==
In 1938 Dainow was asked to become the founding faculty editor of the Louisiana Law Review that published four issues per year.

From 1940 to 1942, he was the chief reporter for the Compiled Edition of the Civil Codes of Louisiana. This two-volume compilation contained the texts of the Louisiana Codes with indication of their source in the French Civil Code. According to Paul M. Hebert, the dean of the LSU Law School, "This important work was the starting point for any major research into a problem of the Louisiana Civil Law".

Out of the Compiled Edition of the Civil Codes of Louisiana emerged the one volume edition in 1947, edited by Professor Dainow. This code was widely used by law students and was kept current by publishing small updates reflecting legislative changes.

Dainow was also the editor for a subsequent important edition of the Civil Codes of Louisiana published in 1972.

He was a contributor of many articles and book reviews to law journals in the United States, Canada and France. He published over 300 works, including 16 books, that are in 1,000 libraries. Among his most important books were: Essays on the Civil Law of Obligations and The Role of Judicial Decisions and Doctrine in Civil Law and in Mixed Jurisdictions.

Professor Dainow developed teaching materials to aid students in their studies. His Cases and Materials on Civil Law Property went through several editions, as did his Security Devices, Cases and Materials.

Dainow was also on the board of editors of the American Journal of Comparative Law from its inception in 1952.

== Organizations ==
Dainow was an active member of many learned societies and organizations, both national and international.

He was a member of the United States National Commission for UNESCO from 1957 to 1959.

In 1956–1962 he served on the executive council of the American Society of International Law. He was one of the American members of the International Academy of Comparative Law.

He twice served as a member of the board of governors of the Louisiana Bar Association. For many years he represented the LSU Law School as a member of the Council of the Louisiana State Law Institute.

Dainow was the first director of the Center of Civil Law Studies of Louisiana State University. The institute under his direction produced and collaborated in publishing a number of significant works in the civil law field.

From 1952 to 1959 Dainow contributed to a Harvard-Brandeis legal research project for Israel's legal development that included conferences, meetings, reports and correspondence with Israeli officials and jurists.

Dainow was also a member of the American Bar Association, American Association of University Professors, American Foreign Law Association, American Society of Comparative Law, Order of the Coif, Omicron Delta Kappa, Phi Kappa Phi, and Gamma Eta Gamma.
