= June Norma Olley =

English-born Australian seafood technologist

June Norma Olley AM FTSE (2 March 1924 – 29 July 2019) was an English-Australian seafood technologist and advocate for women's education. She was among the first to devise a scientific methodology for predictive microbiology.

== Early life ==
Olley was born on 2 March 1924 in London in a bungalow at the back of Croydon aerodrome. Despite the expense, she was enrolled in boarding school by her mother who even inspected the standard of the school's laboratories. Her father, an early aviator and airline owner, "didn't believe in education for girls". Passionate about science from a young age, she was so devoted to her studies that her teachers blocked out the windows of the science library during the Blitz so she could continue to work there at night.

== Early career ==
Olley completed a Bachelor of Science with Honours from University College London in 1944. She then went on to do a PhD on lipid metabolism in 1950 at the London School of Hygiene and Tropical Medicine.

She then joined the Torry Research Station near Aberdeen where she worked for 18 years. The station's research focused on marine fats, in particular fishmeal and she worked on turning excess herring into margarine. She also travelled extensively during this time, undertaking research in Jerusalem and Rome.

== Career in Australia ==
Olley met two Australian fisheries scientists in Aberdeen who sought her advice on whether Tasmania should have a fishmeal industry. Having met her future husband, who was also based in Hobart, Olley eventually moved to Tasmania in 1968. Having visited the abalone factory at Margate, she advised them that their product was tough due to incorrect acidity. She dropped into the CSIRO Regional Laboratory, on Battery Point, asking to borrow a pH meter.

"The director had me in and talked to me for about an hour, after which he said, 'I think we need you here.' He rang up the CSIRO headquarters in Sydney and got me an interview, and I went back to lunch and surprised my fiancé by saying, 'Well, I've got a pH meter and a job.'"

She joined the CSIRO Division of Food Preservation at the Tasmanian Research Laboratory as Senior Principal Research Scientist leading a group which specialised in fish and shellfish in 1969.

Working closely with David Ratkowsky over 30 years, she devised a scientific methodology to predict food safety, continuing to work with him after her retirement in 1989, when she moved to the University of Tasmania. There she supervised and mentored many students, valuing collaboration. "Why compete when you can have more minds working on the problems, since there are more than enough [problems] to go round," she is quote as saying.

In 1972, Olley was elected junior vice-president of the Tasmanian Royal Society, becoming senior vice-president in 1973.

Olley was elected a Foundation Fellow of the Australian Academy of Technology and Engineering. She received an award of merit from the Australian Institute of Food Science and Technology. She was appointed a Member of the Order of Australia in 1987.

In 2005, she received the 15th Silver Jubilee Award of Excellence from the Australian Marine Sciences Association. The following year she was inducted to the Tasmanian Honour Roll of Women.

Olley died on 29 July 2019 aged 95.
