= Godfrey Blunden =

Australian journalist and author

Godfrey Verge ‘Geof’ Blunden (19 March 1906 – 15 March 1996) was an Australian journalist and author.

Godfrey Blunden was born in Melbourne. While he was a journalist in Sydney in the early 1930s he wrote his first novel No More Reality a "small country town" novel, published in 1935 by Jonathan Cape. Even though the edition was only 500 copies it was considered important, due to praise from Norman Lindsay, Brian Penton in the Bulletin, and others in the Telegraph and elsewhere in the Sydney press. Early Australian modernist poet Ronald McCuaig dedicated his 1938 book of poems Vaudeville to Blunden.

Employed by the Sydney Daily Telegraph Blunden was sent to England in 1941 and covered the Battle of Britain, before travelling in 1942 to the Soviet Union, where he covered fighting in the Stalingrad (Volgograd) and Kharkov (Kharkiv) fronts. His dispatches were also published in the London Evening Standard. He was one of the few western reporters to witness and report on the Battle of Stalingrad, which ended with the surrender of German forces in the city in February 1943, as well as subsequent fighting around Kharkov and Rzhev.

After returning to England in 1944, he covered the battles in the Netherlands and Germany, while attached to the US Ninth Air Force and the US Ninth Army.

He met Maria Rothenberg-Craipeau in Paris a month after the liberation of the city and after the war they both left for the United States, where they married and lived eleven years. He worked for Time for 14 years as a reporter in New York and later as a correspondent in Paris and received a Guggenheim Fellowship for fiction in 1953. He left Time-Life in 1965 to concentrate on novels and non-fiction. The Blundens settled in Paris and later in Vence, France. He never returned to Australia, but was a passionate Australian and never gave up his close bond with the country through exchanging letters and receiving visits from his extended family and later devoting most of his writing to Australian subjects and themes.

Blunden authored several novels, including A Room on the Route (about the NKVD, predecessor to the KGB, during World War II) and The Time of the Assassins. His novel Charco Harbour is a modernist historical fiction on Captain James Cook and his journey along the Australian coast in 1768. He died in Paris in 1996.

== Select works ==
- No More Reality, 1935
- A Room on the Route, 1947
- The Time of the Assassins, 1953
- The Looking Glass Conference, 1957
- Charco Harbour, 1968

== Non-fiction select works ==
- The Land and People of Australia, 1954
- Australia and Her People, 1960
- Impressionists and impressionism (with Maria Blunden), 1972
- Norman Lindsay Watercolours. Fifteen Reproductions in Colour from Original Watercolours with an Appreciation of the Medium By Norman Lindsay and a Survey of the Artist's Life and Work, 1973
