= James C. Soper =

American lawyer and politician

James C. Soper (August 25, 1907 – November 16, 1990) was an American lawyer and politician.

Soper was born in Chicago, Illinois. He went to the Cicero public schools and to Morton College. Soper received his law degree from University of Illinois College of Law and was admitted to the Illinois bar in 1931. Soper lived in Cicero, Illinois with his wife and family and practiced law in Cicero. He served in the United States Army during World War II in the intelligence division of the medical corps. He served in the Illinois Senate from 1967 until 1979 and was a Republican. Soper died at Loyola University Medical Center in Maywood, Illinois.
