= Maurice Pouzet =

Sculptor and illustrator

Maurice Pouzet (born in Laval in 1921 and died in Angers in 1997) was a French sculptor and illustrator. He was known for his book illustrations, slate sculptures, and medals.

== Life ==
Pouzet trained at the Angers School of Fine Arts where he took courses in decoration and sculpture. He branched off into commerce, graduating in 1939 from the Angers business school.

In 1941, he became a designer with the Bricard architectural firm.

In 1942, he began a career as an illustrator within the team of Éditions Jacques Petit, where he became known for his illustrations of classics including works by Colette, Jean de la Fontaine, and Molière.

Pouzet also took part in poster competitions. This led him, by way of an advert for a slate company, to discover his talents as a slate sculptor. This in turn led him to metal engraving, and in particular to orders for medals for the Monnaie de Paris.

His work is defined above all by its variety. To the end of his life he continued research into cartoons and tapestry "patterns".

== Recognition and legacy ==
In 1964, to mark the twinning of Angers with Osnabrück, a slate sculpture by Pouzet was among the gifts offered by Angers to Osnabrück. It shows the coats of arms of the two cities, surrounded by the figures of Charlemagne and a Plantagenet knight holding a trowel (a symbol of peace).

In 1980, he was made a Knight of Arts and Letters.

A retrospective of his work was held in Angers in 2008.

== Artworks ==
He illustrated:

- Jeannot and Colin by Voltaire (1944),
- Casanova, some Parisian adventures, introductions and notes by Jacques Isolle, Editions Jacques Petit (1944),
- Paul-Louis Courier "An adventure in Calabria", illustrations by Maurice Pouzet, Éditions Jacques-Petit, Angers, 1945.
- Chronicle of Saint-Macé by Jacques Isolle (1945),
- Mardoche by Alfred de Musset, ed. Jacques Petit (1945),
- In the company of another Anjou wine by Félix Landreau, ed. Jacques Petit (1945),
- Selected poems, by Lamartine, ed. Jacques Petit (1945)
- An adventure in Calabria by Paul-Louis Courier, ed. Jacques Petit (1945)
- The Works of François Villon, Éditions Athéna, Paris, (1947),
- Selected poems by Gérard de Nerval, ed. Jacques Petit (1947),
- The Passion of our Hairy Brother by Marc Leclerc, ed. Jacques Petit (1947),
- Candide or the Optimist by Voltaire (1948),
- The Lesson of Love in a Park by René Boylesve (1949),
- Three ladies from the Loire Valley by Antoinette de La Paumelière, ed. Jacques Petit (1950),
- Torrents by Marie-Anne Desmarest (1950),
- Daphnis and Chloe by Longus (1954),
- Complete works of Molière, Ed. Arc-en-Ciel (1954–1955),
- The confessions of the Count of *** by Charles Duclos (1956), etc.
