= Albert H. Henderson =

American politician

Albert Homer Henderson

Member of the New York State Assembly
- In office 1920–1921
- Constituency: Bronx County, 1st District

Surrogate of Bronx County
- In office 1930–1951

Personal details
- Born: April 1, 1893 The Bronx, New York, U.S.
- Died: October 11, 1951 (aged 58) Manhattan, New York, U.S.
- Party: Democratic
- Spouse: Florence Weick
- Children: 3
- Occupation: Lawyer, judge, politician

Military service
- Branch/service: United States Army Air Service
- Rank: First lieutenant
- Battles/wars: World War I

Albert Homer Henderson (April 1, 1893 – October 11, 1951) was an American lawyer, politician, and judge from New York.

== Life ==
Henderson was born on April 1, 1893, in the Bronx, New York. His father was Albert C. Henderson, and his mother was an actress whose stage name was Lilly Van Clief.

Henderson attended Morris High School and graduated from Cornell Law School in 1914. He was admitted to the bar in 1915 and began practicing law in New York City. In May 1917, during World War I, he entered the officers' training camp in Plattsburgh. He was commissioned in the Infantry and later transferred to the Air Service. He was honorably discharged from the Air Service in December 1918 with the rank of first lieutenant, air service aeronautics. He then returned to his law practice and became a member of the local school board.

In 1919, Henderson was elected to the New York State Assembly as a Democrat, representing the Bronx County 1st District. He served in the Assembly in 1920 and 1921. He was appointed assistant District Attorney of the Bronx in 1921. He served in that position until 1930, when Governor Franklin D. Roosevelt appointed him Surrogate of Bronx County to fill a vacancy caused by the death of Surrogate George M. S. Schulz. He was elected to a full term as Surrogate later that year with the Democratic nomination and endorsements from the New York City Bar Association and the Bronx County Bar Association. He was re-elected by all the major parties for a second term in 1944. He was still serving as Surrogate when he died.

Henderson was president of the Samoset Club of the Bronx. He was a member of the Freemasons, the Elks, the YMCA, Gamma Eta Gamma, and the American Legion. Shortly after completing his military service, he married Florence Weick. Their children were Albert W., Robert, and Donald.

Henderson died at St. Luke's Hospital in Manhattan from a heart ailment after a two-year illness on October 11, 1951.

New York State Assembly
Preceded by Earl H. Miller	New York State Assembly; Bronx County, 1st District; 1920–1921	Succeeded by Nicholas J. Eberhard
