= Jonathan Olley =

British photographer (born 1967)

- Born: 1967 (age 58–59); London, United Kingdom
- Education: Chelsea College of Arts, University of Wales Newport School of Documentary Photography
- Occupation: Photographer

Jonathan Olley (born 1967) is a British photographer known for his work in capturing landscapes characterized by signs of human folly. In addition to his photography, Olley has worked as a war reporter and a photographer for the motion picture industry.

== Early life and education ==
Olley was born in London. After leaving Chelsea College of Arts, he enrolled in the postgraduate program at the University of Wales Newport School of Documentary Photography.

== Early career ==
In 1989, Olley started working as a freelance press photographer. In 1990, he was awarded the Nikon Press Award for a photo essay featured in The Independent newspaper. Between 1991 and 1993, Olley reported on the collapse of the Berlin Wall and the Velvet Revolution in Czechoslovakia, for various UK press outlets. At the end of 1993, Olley relocated from London to New York City. In 1992, he became a member of London-based Network Photographers while continuing to work as a freelancer. During this time, he initiated a project in New Mexico and Nevada, focusing on the atomic bomb.

== The Siege of Sarajevo ==
In 1994, Olley lived under siege in Sarajevo, Bosnia, making news photographs for the Boston Globe, Paris Match, L'Express, and The Guardian. On February 5th, 1994, he was present during the market massacre in Sarajevo, where 68 people were killed and 200 wounded. Olley's photographs depicting the market massacre were shown at Visa pour l'Image Perpignan, France, in 1994. His photo essay on Sarajevo also earned him the Observer Hodge Award as Young Photojournalist of the Year in 1995.

== Photo essays and personal projects ==
With the assistance of a bursary, Olley traveled to Japan to finalize his Atom Bomb project, focusing on Hiroshima and Nagasaki. An exhibition of this work was shown at The Photographers' Gallery in London.

In 1996, Olley embarked on a personal project centered on the Newbury Bypass road protests in the forests of Berkshire.

In the 1997 World Press Photo Awards, Olley received first prize in the 'Nature & Environment' category for his essay on the Newbury Bypass road protest, and first prize in the 'Arts' category for his essay on the Burning Man festival in Nevada. In the same year, Olley initiated a project for an exhibition commemorating the 50th anniversary of the National Health Service (NHS). This project received extensive publication in Britain and Europe and was exhibited in over 50 NHS hospitals across the UK.

== Modern Castles of Northern Ireland ==
Completed in 1989, Olley's work titled 'Modern Castles of Northern Ireland' documents the architectural landscape shaped by The Troubles of Northern Ireland, including fortified police stations, watchtowers, and army barracks.

Initially published in Source Magazine, Olley's work was exhibited at the Festival International Du Reportage in Perpignan, France. Subsequently, the work was displayed at various venues including the ICA (London, UK), the Letterkenny Arts Centre (Co. Donegal, Republic of Ireland), and the Noorderlicht Photofestival (Groningen, Netherlands). In 2003, it was acquired for national preservation by the Public Record Office and the Imperial War Museum. In 2010, it was exhibited at Tate Modern in London as part of Exposed: Voyeurism, Surveillance, and the Camera. Additionally, it was published as a book by Factotum in 2007.

== Kosovo ==
In 1999, Olley journeyed to Macedonia during the refugee crisis and continued his work in Kosovo following the liberation. The resulting book, titled Kosovo, was published by Network Photographers in collaboration with the 'Partners'. The book was sold to generate funds for The International Red Cross and included the photography of Sebastião Salgado, Olley, and Joachim Ladeofoged. In 2000, the book received the D&AD (Design & Art Directors) Award for Olley's photography.

== The Forbidden Forest ==
"The Forbidden Forest" examines the peripheral effects of warfare on the landscape. The images center on the battle for Verdun, located in Northeast France, known as the 'Zone Rouge', covering approximately 450 square miles (1,200 km2), inaccessible to the public since the armistice of 1918. 'The Forbidden Forest' was showcased alongside 'Castles of Ulster' at Diemar/Noble Photography, London, in 2009.

== Later work ==
During the 2000s, Olley engaged in the large colour landscape project 'Between Home & Heaven' on the uninhabited volcanic Island of Surtsey, Iceland. He also explored 'Fairy Stones,' delving into myths and superstitions and their impact on modern Icelandic society, and 'Engineering Nature,' which examined humankind's aspiration to create an 'Edenic' landscape, considering aspects such as land use management, reclamation, leisure use of the landscape, and car culture.

In 2004, Olley journeyed to Iraq to further a project aimed at creating visual art that conceptualizes the relationships between the human and natural worlds.

Currently residing in London, Olley holds a part-time teaching position on the Documentary Photography course at the University of Wales, Newport.

== Movie stills photography ==
Olley served as a stills photographer on the films Green Zone, United 93, The Hurt Locker and Zero Dark Thirty.
