= Amos Taylor =

American lawyer

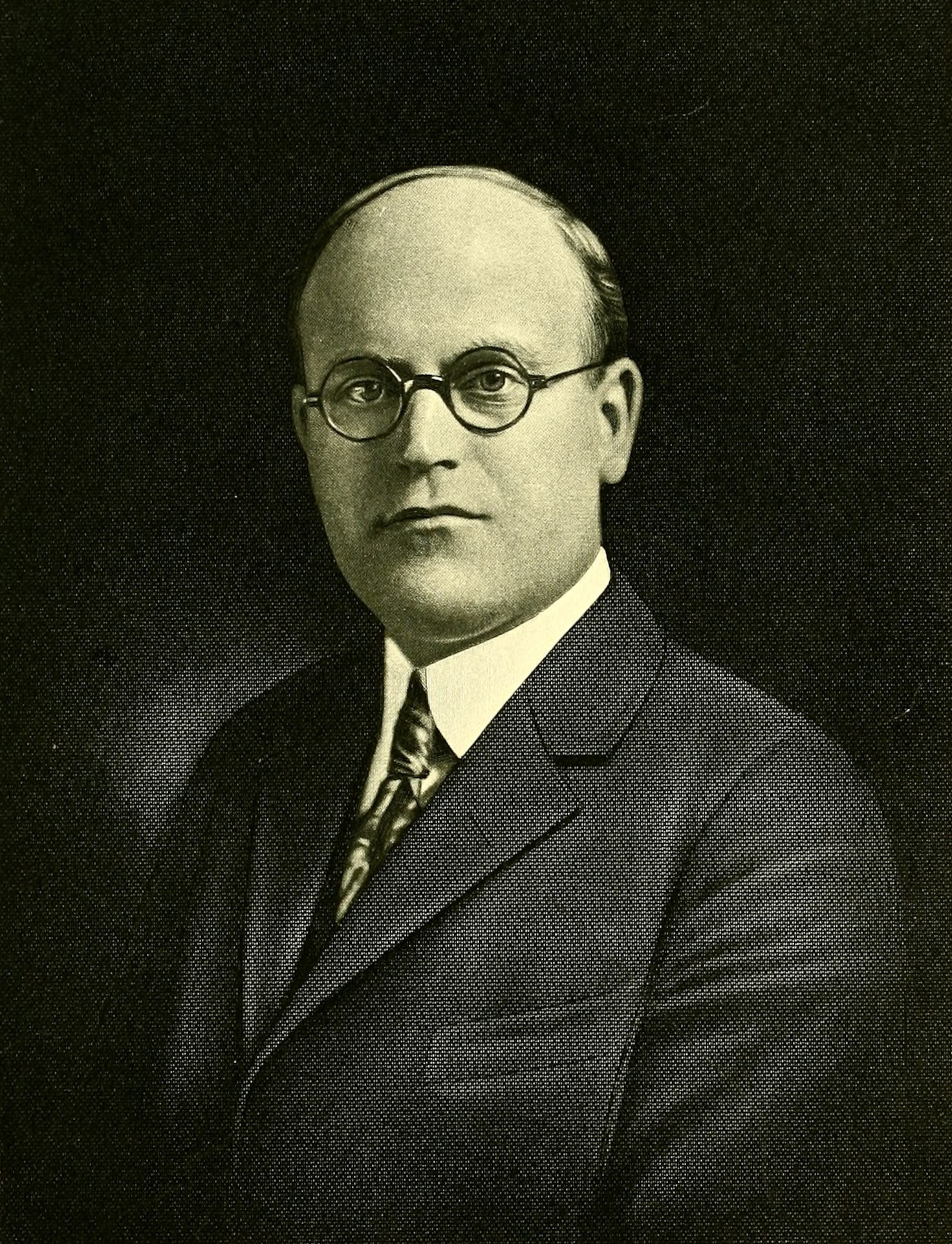
- Born: February 22, 1877; Danbury
- Died: June 2, 1965 (aged 88); Belmont
- Alma mater: Brown University; Boston University School of Law
- Occupation: Lawyer, politician
- Political party: Republican Party

Amos Leavitt Taylor (1877–1965) was a lawyer and a politician who was very active in the Massachusetts Republican Party.

== Personal life ==
Taylor was born in Danbury, New Hampshire, on February 22, 1877, to father Frank Leavitt Taylor and mother Nellie Jane (Martin) Taylor.

Amos Leavitt Taylor attended college at Brown, graduating in 1901 with a Bachelor of Arts degree, then earned an LL.B at Boston University School of Law. In Boston, he worked at Adams & Blinn, Counsellors at Law for the next 60 years. He married Myra Lillian Fairbank on June 16, 1906. Their son, Amos Leavitt Taylor, Jr., also went to Brown, graduating in 1935, then attended Harvard Law School. After 30 years of marriage, Myra Taylor died in 1944. Amos remarried, to Caroline W. Dudley.

== Notable legal cases ==
In the winter of 1912, Taylor and Robert Goodwin represented Marjorie Newell Robb against Oceanic Steam Navigation Company for the sum of $110,400.00, together with costs from the April 15, 1912, sinking of the Titanic. The loss of the life of her husband for the sum of $110,000.00, and the loss of the luggage and personal effect in the sum of $400.00.

== Political life ==
In 1924, he was a delegate (alternate) to the Republican National Convention from Massachusetts.

For twenty-five years, from 1924 to 1949, he was a member of Massachusetts Republican State Committee, serving as its secretary from 1927 to 1928, and its state chair from 1929 to 1932.

He was a delegate to the 1932 Republican National Convention from Massachusetts.

He was a member of the American Bar Association, as well as Gamma Eta Gamma and the Freemasons. Taylor was one of the founders of Phi Gamma Delta at Brown University, and an officer and life member of The Bostonian Society. He was a Unitarian.

== Later years ==
In his honor, the Amos L. Taylor Award for Excellence in Scholarship was established at the New England School of Law for special part-time student which are awarded at the end of the J.D. program.

Taylor died at his home in Belmont on June 2, 1965.
