= Edgar Bogardus =

American poet

- Born: 26 July 1927; Mount Vernon, Ohio, US
- Died: 11 May 1958 (aged 30); Mount Vernon, Ohio, US
- Writing career
- Genre: poetry
- Notable awards: 1953 Guggenheim Fellowship

Edgar Collins Bogardus (26 July 1927 – 11 May 1958) was an American poet. His work appeared in The Kenyon Review , Shenandoah, Virginia Quarterly Review, Yale Literary Magazine.

== Biography ==
He was born on 26 July 1927 in Mount Vernon, Ohio. He graduated from Yale University with a B.A. and an M.A. He taught at Carnegie Institute of Technology, the University of Connecticut, and Kenyon College. He was managing editor of the Kenyon Review. He died on 11 May 1958 in Mount Vernon, Ohio.

== Awards ==
- 1953: Guggenheim Fellowship

== Works ==
- Various jangling keys. Yale University Press. 1953.
- Last poems, The Kenyon review, 1960

=== Anthologies ===
- Robert T. Moore (ed.). "The Lament of Orpheus; The Wall of Rome". Best Poems of 1956: Borestone Mountain Poetry Awards. Stanford University Press. ISBN 978-0-8047-1611-6.
