= Astromicrobiology =

Study of microorganisms in outer space

Astromicrobiology, or exomicrobiology, is the study of microorganisms in outer space. It stems from an interdisciplinary approach, which incorporates both microbiology and astrobiology. Astrobiology's efforts are aimed at understanding the origins of life and the search for life other than on Earth. Because microorganisms are the most widespread form of life on Earth, and are capable of colonising almost any environment, scientists usually focus on microbial life in the field of astrobiology. Moreover, small and simple cells usually evolve first on a planet rather than larger, multicellular organisms, and have an increased likelihood of being transported from one planet to another via the panspermia theory.

== Planetary exploration ==
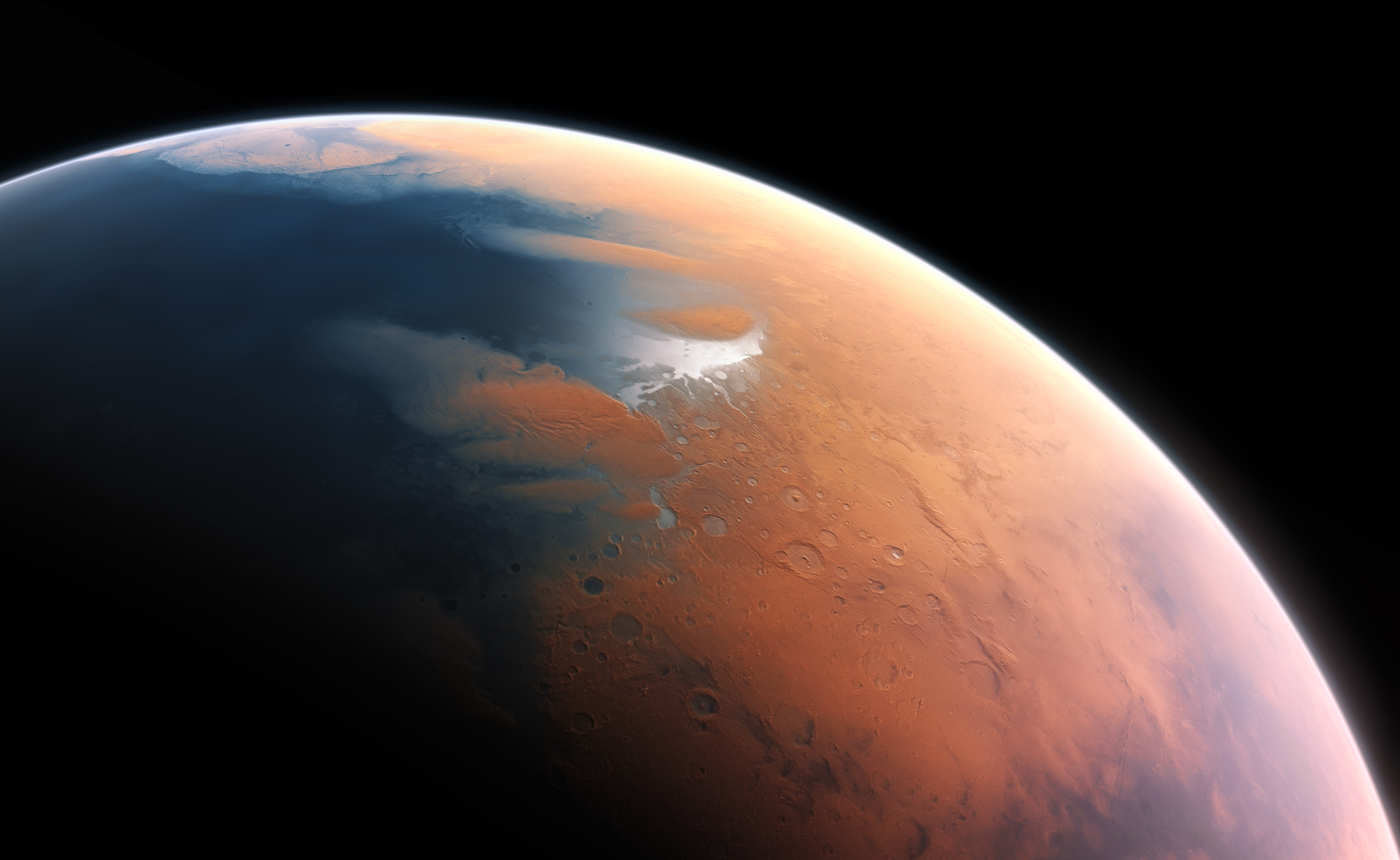
Depiction of a once water covered Mars

The search for extraterrestrial microbial life have focused mostly on Mars due to its promising environment and close proximity; however, other astrobiological sites include the moons Europa, Titan and Enceladus. All of these sites currently have or have had a recent history of possessing liquid water, which scientists hypothesize as the most consequential precursor for biological life. Europa and Enceladus appear to have large amounts of liquid water hidden beneath the layers of ice that covers their surfaces. Titan, on the other hand, is only planetary body besides Earth with liquid hydrocarbons on its surface. Mars is the main area of interest for the search for life primarily because of convincing evidence that suggests surface liquid water activity in recent history. Furthermore, Mars has an atmosphere containing abundant amounts of carbon and nitrogen, both essential elements needed for life.

== Discoveries ==
In 1975, NASA's Viking program launched two identical landers to the surface of Mars, each carrying scientific instruments. Their biological experiments included gas chromatography–mass spectrometry to identify the components of Martian soil, analysis of gas exchange with the Martian environment, pyrolytic release of radioactive ^{14}C to check if carbon fixation occurred, and labelled release of additional ^{14}C alongside seven Miller-Urey products to discern metabolic processes. The labelled release experiment produced the only results that could not be conclusively explained by non-biological chemical reactions until NASA's Phoenix spacecraft showed the presence of perchlorates on Mars' surface in 2008. Such compounds could produce the radiolabeled CO_{2} recorded by the landers.

In operation since 2012, NASA's Curiosity rover has found evidence of historical conditions on Mars being suitable for life, such as organic matter being preserved in rocks and evidence of past groundwater, though no lifeforms have been found.

In 2014, Vladimir Solovyov of Russia's TASS news agency claimed that cosmonauts found plankton on the International Space Station. NASA officials found no evidence for the claims, though they predicted that some extremophile microorganisms could survive in space.

=== Future missions ===
Mission Title	Launch Date	Agency	Objectives
Mars 2020	2020	NASA	Mobile rover unit that will scavenge Mars' surfaces and collect soil samples
Europa Clipper	2024 (planned)	NASA	Satellite launch that will orbit Jupiter's moon Europa and perform detailed reconnaissance of environmental conditions as well as search for potential landing sites

== Experimentation ==
=== Earth ===
Many studies on Earth have been conducted to collect data on the response of terrestrial microbes to various simulated environmental conditions of outer space. The responses of microbes, such as viruses, bacterial cells, bacterial and fungal spores, and lichens, to isolated factors of outer space (microgravity, galactic cosmic radiation, solar UV radiation, and space vacuum) were determined in space and laboratory simulation experiments. In general, microorganisms tended to thrive in the simulated space flight environment – subjects showed symptoms of enhanced growth and an uncharacteristic ability to proliferate despite the presence of normally suppressive levels of antibiotics. In fact, in one study, trace (background levels) of antibiotic exposure resulted in acquisition of antibiotic resistance under simulated microgravity. The mechanisms responsible for explaining these enhanced responses have yet to be discovered.

=== Space ===
The ability of microorganisms to survive in an outer space environment was investigated to approximate upper boundaries of the biosphere and to determine the accuracy of the interplanetary transport theory for microorganisms. Among the investigated variables, solar UV radiation had the most harmful effect on microbial samples. Among all the samples, only lichens (Rhizocarpon geographicum and Xanthoria elegans) fully survived the 2 weeks of exposure to outer space. Earth's ozone layer greatly protects against the deleterious effects of solar UV, which is why organisms typically are unable to survive without ozone protection. When shielded against solar UV, various samples were able to survive for long periods of times; spores of B. subtilis, for example, were able to proliferate in space for up to 6 years. The data support the likelihood of interplanetary transfer of microorganisms within meteorites, called lithopanspermia hypothesis.

=== Mars ===
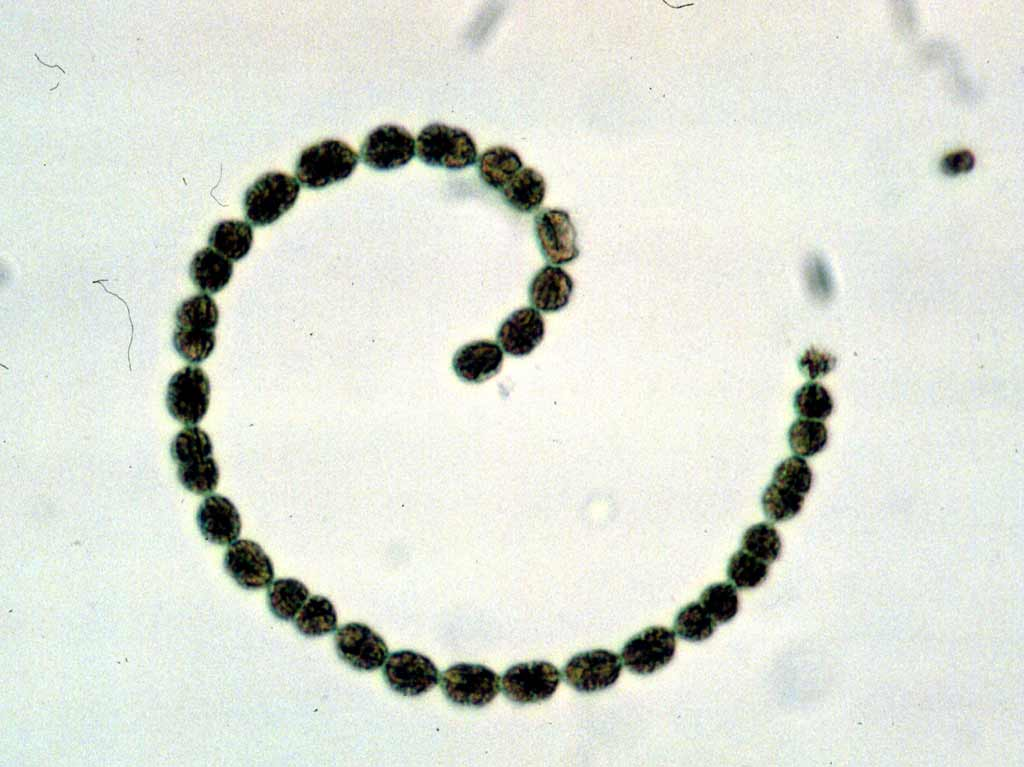
Anabaena flosaquae, a cyanobacterium that would thrive on Mars

Modern technology has already allowed us to use microbes to assist us in extracting materials on Earth, including over 25% of the our current copper supply. Similarly, microbes could help serve a similar purpose on other planets to mine resources, extract useful materials, or create self-sustaining reactors. The most promising of these candidates known to date is cyanobacteria. Billions of years ago, cyanobacteria transformed Earth by pumping oxygen into the atmosphere, and manage to exist in the toughest corners of the Earth. Cyanobacteria, along with some other rock-eating microbes, seem to be able to withstand the harsh conditions of the vacuum of space without much effort. On Mars, however, cyanobacteria will not even have to endure such harsh conditions.

Scientists are currently working on the possibility of installing bioreactors or similar facilities on Mars, which would run entirely on cyanobacteria and provide material for the creation of fuel cells, soil crust formation, regolith amelioration, extraction of useful metals/elements, nutrient release into the soil, and dust removal; a variety of other potentially useful functions are also in the works.

Prototypal diagram of Mars bioreactor

== See also ==
- List of microorganisms tested in outer space
