= Arthur E. Martell =

Distinguished chemistry professor

Arthur E. Martell (October 18, 1916 – October 15, 2003) was a distinguished professor of chemistry at Texas A&M University and award-winning researcher in the field of inorganic chemistry.

His research centered on metal chelate compounds, macrocyclic complexes and cryptates.

== Education ==
Martell was born October 18, 1916, in Natick, Massachusetts. He earned his undergraduate degree in chemistry in 1938 from Worcester Polytechnic Institute before receiving his Ph.D. from New York University.

== Career ==
After completing his doctorate, Martell returned his alma mater WPI as an instructor in the department of chemistry. He later served as chair of the chemistry departments at Clark University and the Illinois Institute of Technology.

In 1966, Martell joined the faculty of Texas A&M University, serving as the head of the department of chemistry until 1980. He was hired specifically to transform the A&M chemistry department into one of national prominence. By the end of his term as department head, he had expanded the faculty by thirty to fifty-five tenure-track professionals and attracted many well-known researchers, including F. Albert Cotton to the department. The number of undergraduate chemistry majors tripled, and the number of graduate students quadrupled.

While leading the department of chemistry, Martell also led a highly productive research group. The group designed new ligands for complexation of iron and aluminium, technology that was used to treat patients with iron or aluminum overload. He cowrote a book on his pioneering research in the chemistry of metal chelate compounds with Nobel Laureate Melvin Calvin, and wrote or edited fourteen other textbooks that are in use by hundreds of chemists and biologists, including works on Critical Stability Constants (six volumes, with R.M. Smith), The Determination and Use of Stability Constants (with R.J. Motekaitis) and Metal Complexes in Aqueous Solutions (with R.D. Hancock). Martell also authored over 550 articles that were published in peer-reviewed scientific journals, most of which dealt with equilibria, kinetics, and the physical properties of metal chelates, macrocyclic complexes and cryptates. In 1993, he, Motekaitis and Smith developed the first computer database to track the reaction rates of ligands and how they react with ions to form complex chemical compounds.

After stepping down as department head in 1980, Martell served as a distinguished professor of chemistry at Texas A&M and continued his research. Although he officially retired from Texas A&M in 2001, he continued to conduct research with his former group until his death. Experiencing kidney trouble, he was forced to undergo dialysis several days per week, but could be found in his lab on days that he was not scheduled for treatment.

== Recognition ==
Martell was honored with awards including the Southwest Regional Award of the American Chemical Society, the ACS Award for Distinguished Service to Inorganic Chemistry, and the Patterson-Crane Award. He was elected an honorary lifetime fellow of the New York Academy of Science and to honorary membership in the Japan Society for Analytical Chemistry. He was a 1953 Guggenheim Fellow, an NIH Special Fellow, and a National Science Foundation Senior Postdoctoral Fellow.

== Family life ==
Martell was married twice. His first marriage, to Norma Saunders, resulted in six children, Jon, Elaine, Stuart, Ed, Janet, and Judy, while his second, to Mary Austin, produced two additional children, Helen and Kathryn.

Martell highly enjoyed the outdoors, spending much of his free time hiking, skiing, and fishing. One of his biggest personal accomplishments was successfully climbing the Matterhorn.
