= Predictive microbiology =

Predictive Microbiology is the area of food microbiology where controlling factors in foods and responses of pathogenic and spoilage microorganisms are quantified and modelled by mathematical equations

It is based on the thesis that micro-organisms' growth and environment are reproducible and can be modeled. Temperature, pH and water activity impact bacterial behavior. These factors can be adjusted to control food spoilage.

Models can be used to predict pathogen growth in foods. Models are developed in several steps including design, development, validation, and production of an interface to display results. Models can be classified attending to their objective in primary models (describing bacterial growth), secondary models (describing factors affecting bacterial growth) or tertiary models (computer software programs).

Predictive biology is an emerging interdisciplinary field that integrates systems biology, computational modeling, and large-scale data analysis to forecast biological behaviors and outcomes. Drawing inspiration from fields such as meteorology, predictive biology aims to shift biology from a primarily descriptive science to one that can accurately anticipate and manipulate biological systems. The approach holds potential across medicine, biotechnology, and environmental sciences.

Predictive biology seeks to understand and forecast the behavior of complex biological systems by integrating experimental data with mathematical and computational models. This discipline is grounded in systems biology, which views biological entities as dynamic networks rather than isolated parts. As a result, predictive biology aims not only to describe existing biological phenomena but also to anticipate future states or responses under varying conditions.

Biology, like meteorology, can advance through structured methodologies such as iterative modeling and interdisciplinary collaboration. Lessons from weather forecasting have shown that improvements in data quality, model accuracy, and communication networks can drastically enhance predictive capacity, a shift now being applied to biological systems to improve long-term forecasts and interventions.

The transition from descriptive to predictive science requires a foundational shift in approach. By focusing on the interactions between genes, proteins, and cellular mechanisms, researchers can model whole biological systems. This systems-based perspective supports the development of more accurate simulations and theoretical frameworks, allowing scientists to better anticipate biological outcomes.

In microbial research, predictive models are being used to understand complex behaviors such as antibiotic resistance and gene expression variability. These models help identify patterns in microbial responses and support efforts to control or harness microbial systems in clinical and industrial contexts. The integration of experimental data with predictive modeling provides new avenues for intervention and bioengineering.

== Conclusion ==
Predictive biology represents a significant step toward understanding and anticipating the behavior of living systems. By combining systems thinking, computational modeling, and data-driven analysis, researchers are beginning to forecast biological outcomes with greater precision. As the field continues to evolve, its integration into areas such as healthcare, biotechnology, and environmental science holds the promise of more informed decisions and targeted interventions, moving biology from observation to prediction.
