= Microbial cytology =

Branch of microbiology

Microbial cytology is the study of microscopic and submicroscopic details of microorganisms. Origin of "Microbial" 1880-85; < Greek mīkro- micro- small + bíos life). "Cytology" 1857; < Cyto-is derived from the Greek "kytos" meaning "hollow, as a cell or container." + -logy meaning "the study of"). Microbial cytology is analyzed under a microscope for cells which were collected from a part of the body. The main purpose of microbial cytology is to see the structure of the cells, and how they form and operate.
