= Antonio Joseph (artist) =

Haitian artist

Antonio Joseph (1921- May 7, 2016) was a Haitian artist.

== Biography ==
Born in Barahona, Dominican Republic, to Haitian parents, Joseph practises painting, sculpture, and screen-printing. He worked as a tailor while studying watercolor and sculpture in Haiti and screen-printing in the United States. He joined the Centre d'Art in 1944 and worked with DeWitt Peters. Joseph was twice awarded a fellowship by the Guggenheim Foundation, in 1953 and again in 1957, for his work as a painter. He traveled extensively in 1963, visiting Morocco and much of Europe. In 1972, he joined the administrative council of the Museum of Haitian Art at St. Pierre College in Port-au-Prince. He taught drawing and screen-printing at the Centre d'Art. His works have been exhibited in the United States, Mexico, Jamaica, and Spain.
