= List of Guggenheim Fellowships awarded in 1942 =

Eighty-two Guggenheim Fellowships were awarded in 1942.

== 1942 U.S. and Canadian Fellows ==
Category	Field of Study	Fellow	Institutional association	Research topic	Notes	Ref
Creative Arts	Drama and Performance Art	Alexander Greendale		Playwriting		
Creative Arts	Fiction	Dorothy Baker		Novel about university life (Trio, published 1943)		
Creative Arts	Fiction	Carson McCullers		Writing	Also won in 1946	
Creative Arts	Fiction	Eudora Alice Welty		Writing	Also won in 1949	
Creative Arts	Fine Arts	Cameron Booth	St. Paul Gallery and School of Art	Painting		
Creative Arts	Fine Arts	Dean Fausett		Painting: Murals for the United States Air Force	Also won in 1943	
Creative Arts	Fine Arts	Joseph Hirsch		Painting	Also won in 1943	
Creative Arts	Fine Arts	Dong Kingman		Painting: Watercolors of American scene subjects	Also won in 1943	
Creative Arts	Fine Arts	Charles Rudy		Sculpture: Stone and bronze, and experimental work in terra cotta and other media		
Creative Arts	Fine Arts	Marion Sanford		Sculpture	Also won in 1941	
Creative Arts	Music Composition	Ernst Bacon	Converse College	Composing	Also won in 1939, 1964	
Creative Arts	Music Composition	Stanley Bate		Composing		
Creative Arts	Music Composition	Burrill Phillips	Eastman School of Music	Composing	Also won in 1961	
Creative Arts	Photography	Wright Morris		Domestic scenes in the South, Midwest, and Southwest (The Inhabitants, published 1946)	Also won in 1946, 1954	
Creative Arts	Poetry	W. H. Auden		Writing		
Creative Arts	Poetry	George Zabriskie		Long poem "involving the dualistic aspect of the private and social man"	Also won in 1946	
Humanities	British History	Lewis Perry Curtis				
Humanities	British History	Jack H. Hexter	Queens College, CUNY	History of the interregnum in England	Also won in 1947, 1979	
Humanities	Classics	Harold Fredrik Cherniss	Johns Hopkins University	Aristotle's Criticism of Plato and the Academy, Vol. II		
Humanities	Classics	Frederick Malcolm Combellack	University of Oregon			
Humanities	Classics	Michael Ginsburg	University of Nebraska	Social policy of the Roman emperors	Also won in 1939	
Humanities	Classics	Doro Levi	Princeton University	Mosaics of Antioch-on-the-Orontes	Also won in 1941	
Humanities	East Asian Studies	George Norbert Kates		Court life of Old China through eight centuries		
Humanities	English Literature	Franklin Gary	Princeton University			
Humanities	English Literature	Edward Niles Hooker	University of California, Los Angeles	History of English literary theory and criticism in the neoclassical period	Also won in 1950	
Humanities	English Literature	Maynard Mack	Yale University	Critical essay of Alexander Pope's Essay on Man	Also won in 1964, 1982	
Humanities	English Literature	Gordon Norton Ray	Harvard University	Definitive edition of the letters and private papers of William Makepeace Thackeray	Also won in 1941, 1945, 1956	
Humanities	English Literature	Mark Schorer	Harvard University	Relationship between ideas and forms in the poetry of William Blake	Also won in 1941, 1948, 1973	
Humanities	English Literature	A.S.P. Woodhouse	University of Toronto	John Milton		
Humanities	Fine Arts Research	Otto Benesch			Also won in 1945	
Humanities	Fine Arts Research	Meyer Schapiro	Columbia University	Preparation of a corpus of paintings, drawings, and ornament in manuscripts of southern France from the 10th to the end of the 12th century, with an analysis and interpretation of these works	Also won in 1939	
Humanities	Fine Arts Research	Saul S. Weinberg	Institute for Advanced Study		Also won in 1941	
Humanities	French Literature	Justin O'Brien	Columbia University	Biographical and critical study of André Gide		
Humanities	General Nonfiction	John Dos Passos		Life of Thomas Jefferson	Also won in 1939, 1940	
Humanities	General Nonfiction	Gustavus Myers		History of bigotry in the United States	Also won in 1941	
Humanities	German and Scandinavian Literature	Harold Stein Jantz	Clark University	New England acquaintance with German thought and literature during the 17th and 18th centuries		
Humanities	History of Science and Technology	Francis Rarick Johnson	Stanford University		Also won in 1949	
Humanities	Iberian & Latin American History	Helen Sullivan Mims		History of the democratic tradition of Spain	Also won in 1941	
Humanities	Linguistics	Einar Ingvald Haugen	University of Wisconsin	Linguistic experiences and behavior of Norwegian immigrants in the United States, with special reference to the historical, social, and cultural processes of immigrant life		
Humanities	Literary Criticism	Maxwell David Geismar	Sarah Lawrence College	Evaluation of the 1920s in America through certain key writers of the period		
Humanities	Literary Criticism	Louise Michelle Rosenblatt				
Humanities	Medieval Literature	Edmund Taite Silk	Yale University	Edits of commentary by Nicholas Trivet on Boethius		
Humanities	Music Research	Colin McPhee		Balinese music	Also won in 1943	
Humanities	Renaissance History	Hans Baron			Also won in 1973	
Humanities	Renaissance History	Vincent Joseph Flynn	University of St. Thomas	History of the English Renaissance and Anglo-Italian relations in the last half of the 15th century		
Humanities	Renaissance History	Craig R. Thompson	Cornell University	Edition of Erasmus' Colloquia famiiliaria	Also won in 1954, 1955, 1968	
Humanities	Philosophy	Horace Leland Friess	Columbia University	Study of the posthumous manuscripts of Felix Adler		
Humanities	Philosophy	Charles William Morris	University of Chicago	General theory of signs		
Humanities	United States History	Alfred Whitney Griswold	Yale University	Political significance of American agriculture		
Humanities	United States History	Frank Hawkins Underhill	University of Toronto	Career of Edward Blake		
Humanities	United States History	Dixon Wecter	University of California, Los Angeles	History of the Roosevelt family in America	Also won in 1943	
Natural Science	Earth Science	Max Harrison Demorest	Wesleyan University	Physics of ice, particularly glacial ice		
Natural Science	Earth Science	Hans Jenny	University of California, Los Angeles	Biology	Also won in 1954	
Natural Science	Earth Science	George Prior Woollard		Seismic, gravitational, and magnetic investigations of the geological structure underlying the North American Atlantic coastal plain	Also won in 1941	
Natural Science	Mathematics	John Charles McKinsey	New York University	Mathematical logic		
Natural Science	Mathematics	Alfred Tarski	Institute for Advanced Study		Also won in 1941, 1955	
Natural Science	Medicine and Health	Simon Dworkin	McGill University	Comparison of the higher nervous activity of dogs, cats, and rats, as revealed by the experimental method of conditioned reflexes		
Natural Science	Medicine and Health	Thomas Rogers Forbes	Johns Hopkins University	Physiology of reproduction		
Natural Science	Molecular and Cellular Biology	Robert Gaunt	New York University	Physiology of the adrenal gland		
Natural Science	Molecular and Cellular Biology	Charles Leonard Huskins	McGill University	Synthesis of cytology and the genetics of plants, animals, and man		
Natural Science	Molecular and Cellular Biology	Salvador E. Luria			Also won in 1963	
Natural Science	Organismic Biology and Ecology	Dietrich H. Bodenstein	Stanford University		Also won in 1941	
Natural Science	Organismic Biology and Ecology	E. Raymond Hall	University of California, Los Angeles	American weasel		
Natural Science	Organismic Biology and Ecology	Jane M. Oppenheimer	Bryn Mawr College	Development of structure and function in the central nervous system of fish	Also won in 1952	
Natural Science	Physics	Wilson M. Powell	University of California, Berkeley	Cosmic rays	Also won in 1941	
Natural Science	Plant Science	John Thomas Curtis	University of Wisconsin	Octological status of the lake forests of Wisconsin, Michigan, Minnesota, and Ontario	Also won in 1956	
Natural Science	Plant Science	Hugh Carson Cutler	Harvard University	Determination of the area in which corn originated	Also won in 1946	
Natural Science	Plant Science	David R. Goddard	University of Rochester	Respiratory enzymes of higher plants		
Natural Science	Plant Science	Floyd Alonzo McClure	Lingnan University	Chinese bamboos	Also won in 1943	
Natural Science	Plant Science	Richard E. Schultes	Harvard University	Economic aspects of the flors of southern Colombia and adjacent Ecuador, and an ethnobotanical study of the useful plants among the Indigenous tribes of the area		
Natural Science	Plant Science	Rolf Singer	Harvard University	Mycological flora of sub-tropical America	Also won in 1952	
Social Science	Anthropology and Cultural Studies	Gordon Townsend Bowles	University of Hawaii	Functional adaptations in the human skeleton based on Hawaiian skeletal materials		
Social Science	Anthropology and Cultural Studies	Morris Edward Opler	Claremont Colleges	Cultures of four related Apache tribes		
Social Science	Economics	Clarence Dickinson Long, Jr.	Wesleyan University	History of unemployment in the United States	Also won in 1941	
Social Science	Economics	Lloyd Appleton Metzler	Harvard University	Cyclical fluctuations in income and investment		
Social Science	Economics	Robert Sidney Smith	Duke University	Guild merchants in colonial Mexico		
Social Science	Political Science	R. Taylor Cole	Duke University	Effects of wartime social, economic, and political changes on the public personnel of Canada	Also won in 1947	
Social Science	Political Science	James A. C. Grant	University of California, Los Angeles	Comparative study of procedure to enforce constitutional guarantees		
Social Science	Psychology	Rudolf Arnheim		Applications of principles and methods of Gestalt psychology to art analysis	Also won in 1941	
Social Science	Psychology	Robert Brodie MacLeod	Swarthmore College	Psychology of color vision		
Social Science	Psychology	Burrhus Frederic Skinner	University of Minnesota	Psychology of language		

== 1942 Latin American and Caribbean Fellows ==
Category	Field of Study	Fellow	Institutional association	Research topic	Notes	Ref
Creative Arts	Fine Arts	Antonio Rodríguez Luna			Also won in 1941	
Creative Arts	Music Composition	Alberto Evaristo Ginastera		Composition	Also won in 1946, 1969	
Humanities	Biography	Antonio Hernández Travieso	Sepúlveda College; Institute of Secondary Education (Havana)	Life of Félix Varela	Also won in 1943	
Humanities	General Nonfiction	Gabriel Fernández Ledesma		Theme of death as depicted in the folk arts of Mexico and the Southwest United States		
Humanities	Iberian and Latin American History	Arturo Arnáiz y Freg	National Autonomous University of Mexico	History of Mexican thought		
Humanities	Philosophy	Raúl Alberto Piérola	National Institute of Secondary Education; Popular Library of Paraná	Influence of phenomenology on contemporary North American philosophy		
Natural Science	Applied Mathematics	Jaime Lifshitz Gaj	National Autonomous University of Mexico	General theory of orbits	Also won in 1943	
Natural Science	Astronomy and Astrophysics	Félix Cernuschi	National University of Tucumán	Statistical mechanics, with special reference to its application to astrophysics	Also won in 1945	
Natural Science	Medicine and Health	Luis Vargas Fernández		Studies at the University of Washington	Also won in 1941	
Natural Science	Molecular and Cellular Biology	Efrén Carlos del Pozo	National School of Biological Sciences	Studies in Boston	Also won in 1941	
Natural Science	Molecular and Cellular Biology	Juan José Lussich Siri	Institute of Endocrinology (Montevideo)	Vitamin chemistry		
Natural Science	Organismic Biology and Ecology	Raúl Cortés Peña	University of Chile	Biological control of insect pests	Also won in 1943	
Natural Science	Organismic Biology and Ecology	Isabel Pérez Farfante			Also won in 1943	
Natural Science	Organismic Biology and Ecology	Fabio Leoni Werneck	Oswaldo Cruz Institute	Taxonomic studies of the Mallophaga of mammals	Also won in 1943	
Natural Science	Physics	Amador Cobas	University of Puerto Rico	Correlation of high energy cosmic rays and atmospheric neutrons		
Natural Science	Plant Science	Rafael Edmundo Pontis Videla	Ministry of Agriculture (Argentina)	Cytological and microchemical studies of host plants infected with spotted wilt		
Social Science	Anthropology and Cultural Studies	Wigberto Jiménez Moreno	National Museum (Mexico)	Pre-Hispanic connections between the Indigenous cultures of Mexico and the Southeast and Southwest United States		

== See also ==
- Guggenheim Fellowship
- List of Guggenheim Fellowships awarded in 1941
- List of Guggenheim Fellowships awarded in 1943
