= List of Guggenheim Fellowships awarded in 1943 =

Sixty-four Guggenheim Fellowships were awarded in 1943. This year, fewer fellowships were awarded so funds could be saved for scholars unable to apply due to the war.

== 1943 U.S. and Canadian Fellows ==
Category	Field of Study	Fellow	Institutional association	Research topic	Notes	Ref
Creative Arts	Choreography	Martha Graham		Choreography to music by Carlos Chavez and Aaron Copland	Also won in 1932, 1944	
Creative Arts	Fiction	Hugh MacLennan	Lower Canada College	Novel about Canadian life during the period 1917 to 1940		
Creative Arts	Fiction	Vladimir Nabokov	Permanente Yard 2	His experience in France during World War II	Also won in 1952	
Creative Arts	Fiction	Vladimir Pozner				
Creative Arts	Fine Arts	Donald Harcourt De Lue		Sculpture	Also won in 1944	
Creative Arts	Fine Arts	Dean Fausett		Painting: Murals for the United States Air Force	Also won in 1942	
Creative Arts	Fine Arts	Joseph Hirsch		Posters for the Red Cross, the Office of War Information, the Army Emergency Relief, and the Office of Emergency Management	Also won in 1942	
Creative Arts	Fine Arts	Dong Kingman		Painting: America at war	Also won in 1942	
Creative Arts	Fine Arts	Mauricio Lasansky		Work at Atelier 17 in New York	Also won in 1944, 1945, 1953, 1964	
Creative Arts	Fine Arts	Sidney Loeb		Sculpture		
Creative Arts	Fine Arts	Oronzio Maldarelli			Also won in 1931	
Creative Arts	Fine Arts	Ira Moskowitz		Drawing		
Creative Arts	Music Composition	Arthur Kreutz	University of Texas	Composition	Also won in 1945	
Creative Arts	Music Composition	Normand Lockwood	Oberlin Conservatory of Music	Composition	Also won in 1944	
Creative Arts	Music Composition	Harry Partch		Composition	Also won in 1944, 1950	
Creative Arts	Poetry	Jeremy Ingalls	Western College for Women	Writing		
Creative Arts	Poetry	Muriel Rukeyser		Writing		
Creative Arts	Poetry	José Garcia Villa		Writing		
Creative Arts	Poetry	Edward Ronald Weismiller	Harvard University	Writing	Also won in 1947	
Humanities	American Literature	William Charvat	New York University			
Humanities	American Literature	John T. Flanagan	University of Minnesota	Literature of the Middle West from 1820		
Humanities	American Literature	Harry T. Levin	Harvard University	Symbolism in American fiction	Also won in 1944	
Humanities	American Literature	Madeleine B. Stern			Also won in 1944	
Humanities	American Literature	Randall Stewart	Brown University	Biography of Nathaniel Hawthorne		
Humanities	American Literature	Hugh Mason Wade		Intellectual awakening of French Canada	Also won in 1944	
Humanities	Architecture, Planning, and Design	Eric Mendelsohn				
Humanities	Biography	Signe Kirstine Toksvig		Emanuel Swedenborg		
Humanities	British History	Wilbur Kitchener Jordan	University of Chicago	History of English thought in the 17th century		
Humanities	British History	David Harris Willson	University of Minnesota	Biography of James I	Also won in 1941, 1948, 1963	
Humanities	Classics	Esther V. Hansen	Elmira College	The Attalids of Pergamum (published 1947)		
Humanities	Classics	Eric Alfred Havelock	University of Toronto		Also won in 1941	
Humanities	English Literature	George W. Meyer	Western Reserve University	William Wordsworth's artistic and philosophic development		
Humanities	English Literature	George Frank Sensabaugh	Stanford University	History of ideas of 17th-century England		
Humanities	Film, Video and Radio Studies	Siegfried Kracauer		From Caligari to Hitler (published 1947)	Also won in 1944, 1945	
Humanities	Fine Arts Research	Walter Friedländer	New York University	Comprehensive monograph on Caravaggio and his period		
Humanities	Fine Arts Research	Elizabeth McCausland		American artists, colonial to present		
Humanities	Fine Arts Research	George Alexander Kubler	Yale University	Changing architecture of 16th-century colonial Mexico	Also won in 1952, 1956	
Humanities	Folklore and Popular Culture	Bertrand Harris Bronson	University of California	English and Scottish ballads	Also won in 1944, 1948	
Humanities	Folklore and Popular Culture	Luc Lacourcière	Laval University	French Canadian folksongs and folklore		
Humanities	Iberian and Latin American History	Kathleen Martin Romoli		Colonial history of Colombia's Pacific coast		
Humanities	Linguistics	Helge Kökeritz	University of Minnesota (visiting)	English Shakespearian speech	Also won in 1950	
Humanities	Music Research	Colin McPhee		Balinese music	Also won in 1942	
Humanities	Philosophy	David Frederick Bowers				
Humanities	Philosophy	Richard Booker Brandt	Princeton University	Work by Ralph Waldo Emerson		
Humanities	Philosophy	Albert Hofstadter	New York University	History of empiricism		
Humanities	Philosophy	John Robert Reid	Stanford University	Moral philosophy		
Humanities	Philosophy	Philip Blair Rice	Kenyon College	Ethics and humanist theory		
Humanities	United States History	Ray Allen Billington	Smith College	History of expansion of American settlements from the Atlantic to Mississippi		
Humanities	United States History	Lawrence Averell Harper	University of California	Economic activities and governmental regulations in the English American colonies		
Humanities	United States History	Fred Harvey Harrington	University of Arkansas	Diplomatic growth of the United States		
Humanities	United States History	Townsend Scudder III	Swarthmore College	Biographical history of Concord, Massachusetts		
Humanities	United States History	Dixon Wecter	University of California, Los Angeles	Relationship of soldiers to the civilian population after the United States' three major wars	Also won in 1942	
Natural Science	Earth Science	Kenneth E. Caster	University of Cincinnati	Field study of paleozoic strata in northern Andes Mountains	Also won in 1954, 1955	
Natural Science	Earth Science	Henry Paul Hansen	Oregon State College	Post-pleistocene forest succession and climate in the northwest	Also won in 1947	
Natural Science	Geography and Environmental Studies	Glenn Thomas Trewartha	University of Wisconsin	Detailed geographic studies of certain selected type areas of Japan and China, and reconnaissance surveys of a more general nature in a limited number of larger regions	Also won in 1926	
Natural Science	Organismic Biology and Ecology	Tilly Edinger	Harvard University	Paleontological study of tooth development in reptiles and amphibians	Also won in 1944	
Natural Science	Organismic Biology and Ecology	John Francis Hanson	Massachusetts State College	Species of stoneflies in the United States		
Natural Science	Organismic Biology and Ecology	William Vogt	Office of the Coordinator of Inter-American Affairs	Peru's guano birds		
Natural Science	Plant Sciences	Edgar Anderson	Washington University in St. Louis	Genetics of Indian corn in Mexico and Southwest United States	Also won in 1950, 1956	
Natural Science	Plant Sciences	Emma Lucy Braun	University of Cincinnati	Ecology of deciduous forests	Also won in 1944	
Natural Science	Plant Sciences	Floyd Alonzo McClure	Smithsonian Institution	Bamboos of the Western Hemisphere	Also won in 1942	
Social Science	Economics	Abram Lincoln Harris	Howard University	Types of economics and their current significance	Also won in 1935, 1936, 1953	
Social Science	Economics	Donald Chalmers MacGregor	University of Toronto			
Social Science	Political Science	John Donald Lewis	Oberlin College	American political trends since 1900		
Social Science	Psychology	Solomon E. Asch			Also won in 1941	
Social Science	Psychology	Barbara Stoddard Burks	Columbia University	Identical twins reared apart		
Social Science	Sociology	Samuel Delbert Clark	University of Toronto	Development of evangelical religious movements in Canada		

== 1943 Latin American and Caribbean Fellows ==
Category	Field of Study	Fellow	Institutional association	Research topic	Notes	Ref
Creative Arts	Fine Arts	Teodoro Núñez Ureta	National University of San Agustín			
Creative Arts	Poetry	Octavio Paz		Writing		
Humanities	Biography	Antonio Hernández Travieso	Institute of Secondary Education (Havana)	Life of Félix Varela	Also won in 1942	
Humanities	Iberian and Latin American History	Ramón Iglesia	College of Mexico	Mexican historiography in the 16th century	Also won in 1945	
Natural Sciences	Applied Mathematics	Jaime Lifshitz Gaj	National Autonomous University of Mexico	General theory of orbits	Also won in 1942	
Natural Sciences	Medicine and Health	Mario Autori		Fungus-growing ants of Brazil		
Natural Sciences	Medicine and Health	Gabriel Gašić Livačić				
Natural Sciences	Molecular and Cellular Biology	José Antonio Goyco	School of Tropical Medicine	Production, processing, and preservation of tropical foods		
Natural Sciences	Organismic Biology and Ecology	Raúl Cortés Peña	Ministry of Agriculture (Chile)	Methods of controlling insect pests	Also won in 1942	
Natural Sciences	Organismic Biology and Ecology	Isabel Pérez Farfante	University of Havana	Increasing the supply of mollusks and crustaceans in Cuban waters	Also won in 1942	
Natural Sciences	Organismic Biology and Ecology	Fabio Leoni Werneck		Taxonomic studies of the Mallophaga of mammals	Also won in 1942	
Natural Sciences	Plant Science	Juan Ignacio Valencia	National University of Cuyo	Betterment of South American forage crops	Also won in 1941, 1942	
Social Science	Economics	Adolfo Dorfman	Colegio Libre de Estudios Superiores (Buenos Aires)	Methods of classifying and interpreting economic phenomena	Also won in 1944	
Social Science	Economics	Raúl García	National University of Córdoba	Agrarian policy in the United States	Also won in 1945	

== See also ==
- Guggenheim Fellowship
- List of Guggenheim Fellowships awarded in 1942
- List of Guggenheim Fellowships awarded in 1944
