= University of Toronto Press =

Publishing unit of the University of Toronto

- Parent company: University of Toronto
- Founded: 1901; 125 years ago
- Country of origin: Canada
- Headquarters location: 800 Bay Street; Toronto, Ontario
- Distribution: Worldwide
- Publication types: Scholarly books and journals
- Official website: utorontopress.com

University of Toronto Press (UTP) is a Canadian university press operated by the University of Toronto. Although it was founded in 1901, the press did not actually publish any books until 1911. It is the oldest and largest university press in Canada and one of the largest in North America. Its distribution division has locations in both Toronto and Buffalo, New York.

== History ==
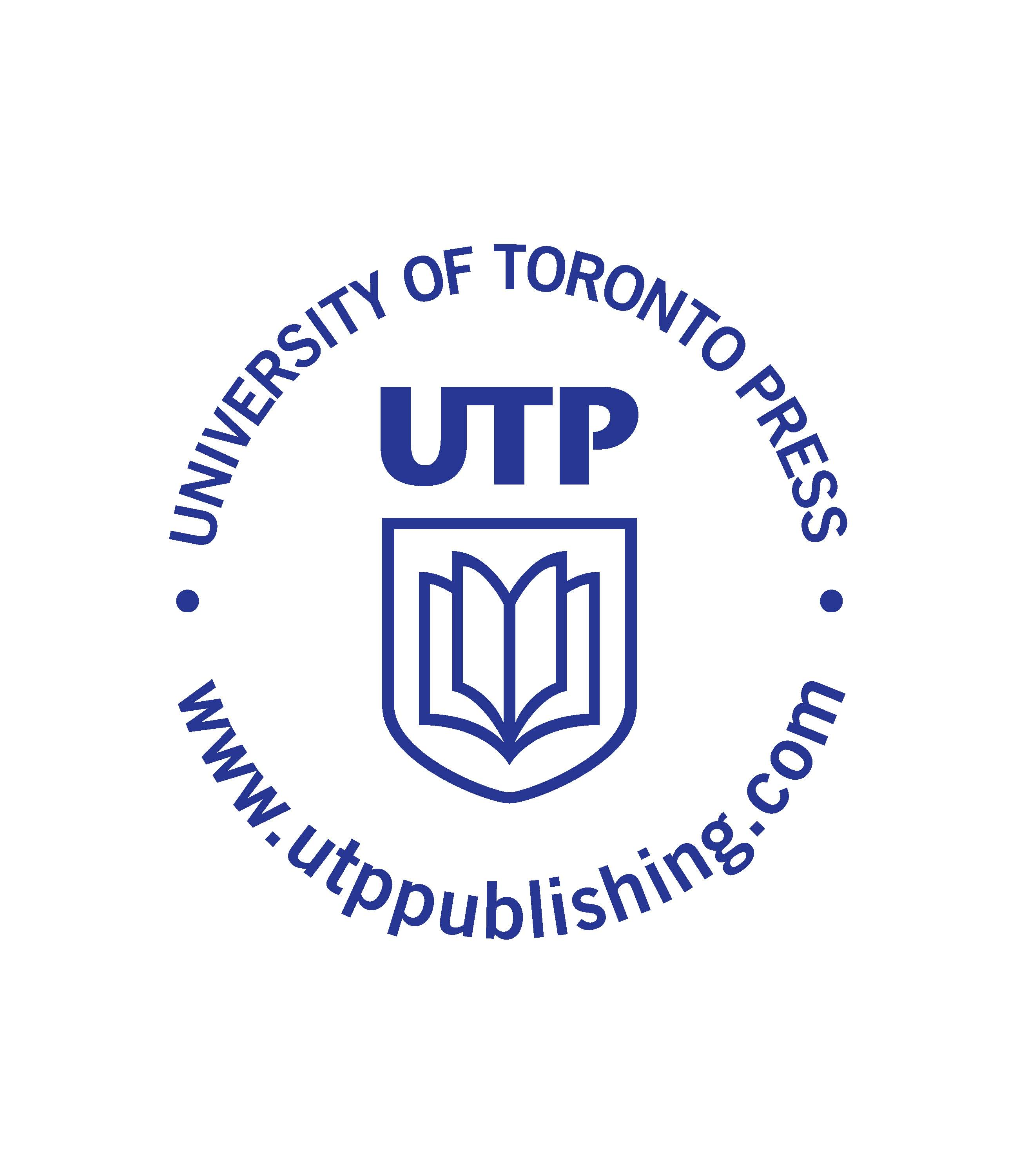
The former UTP logo

The press originally printed only examination books and the university calendar. Its first scholarly book was a work by a classics professor at University College, Toronto. The press took control of the university bookstore in 1933. It employed a novel typesetting method to print issues of the Canadian Journal of Mathematics, founded in 1949.

The press has always had close ties with University of Toronto Libraries. The press was partially located in the library from 1910-1920. The University Librarian Hugh Hornby Langton, the lead librarian of the University of Toronto Libraries, served as the first general editor of the University of Toronto Press.

Sidney Earle Smith, president of the University of Toronto in the late 1940s and 1950s, instituted a new governance arrangement for the press modelled on the governing structure of the university as a whole (on the standard Canadian university governance model defined by the Flavelle commission). Henceforth, the press's business affairs and editorial decision-making would be governed by separate committees, the latter by academic faculty. A committee composed of Vincent Bladen, George Williams Brown (general editor of the press from 1951), and A. S. P. Woodhouse studied the publishing policies of American university presses to inform the structure of the press's publishing division.

Beginning in 1971, the press printed its books simultaneously on paper and microfiche.

The press is currently a member of the Association of University Presses.

== Divisions ==
University of Toronto Press consists of three divisions. They are:

- The publishing division, its most notable
- The distribution division, which includes its educational resources department
- The retail division, which operates the University of Toronto Bookstore with four locations:
  - St. George Bookstore (Koffler Student Services Centre, Toronto)
  - Mississauga Bookstore (William G. Davis Building, Mississauga)
  - Scarborough Bookstore (Retail and Parking Commons, Scarborough)
  - Faculty of Law Bookstore (Jackman Law Building, Toronto)

== See also ==
- Dictionary of Canadian Biography
- University of Toronto Press Publications

== Sources ==
- Harman, Eleanor, ed. (1961). The University as Publisher. University of Toronto Press. ISBN 978-1-4426-1519-9. JSTOR 10.3138/j.ctt1vxmbd1. OCLC 1151834758.
- Jeanneret, Marsh (1989). God and Mammon: Universities as Publishers. Macmillan of Canada. ISBN 0-7715-9205-1. OCLC 20525803.
