= Henry Paul Hansen =

- Born: April 28, 1907; La Crosse, Wisconsin, United States of America
- Died: October 8, 1989 (aged 82); Corvallis, Oregon
- Education: University of Wisconsin–Madison (B.Sc., M.Sc.); University of Washington (Ph.D.)
- Known for: Palynology, Quaternary geology
- Scientific career
- Fields: Geology, botany, palynology
- Workplaces: Oregon State University
- Doctoral advisor: G. B. Rigg

Henry Paul Hansen (April 28, 1907 – October 8, 1989) was an American palynologist known largely for his pioneering work on the vegetation history of the North American Pacific Northwest and for his time as the dean of Graduate Studies at Oregon State University from 1949 to 1972.

== Early life ==
Henry Hansen was born on April 28, 1907, in La Crosse, Wisconsin, to parents Andrew and Emma Petersen Hansen.

In 1939 he was married to Helen Rivedal and had five children with her before she died in 1972. He later married Ethel Welch in 1979.

== Education ==
Hansen obtained the Bachelor of Science degree in 1930 from the University of Wisconsin–Madison, where he continued studying until he was awarded his M.Sc in 1931. From Wisconsin, Hansen moved to the University of Washington in 1935, where his thesis focused on the pollen analysis from bogs in the Puget Lowlands of Washington.

== Scientific career ==
Henry Hansen began teaching at Oregon State University in 1939 as an instructor. His research continued throughout his time there, including the collection and analysis of over 50 palynological records for the Pacific Northwest. One of his seminal publications was Postglacial Forest Succession, Climate, and Chronology in the Pacific Northwest, published in 1947. This work was all the more impressive given that chronologies at the time lacked stable age-depth controls later afforded by C^{14} dating.

== Awards and recognition ==
- 1943-1944 - Guggenheim Fellowship
- 1947-1948 - Guggenheim Fellowship
