= Paul Hirsch (film editor) =

American film editor

- Born: Paul Frederick Hirsch; November 14, 1945 (age 80); New York City, U.S.
- Education: Columbia University (BA)
- Occupation: Film editor
- Years active: 1970–present
- Movement: New Hollywood
- Father: Joseph Hirsch
- Awards: Academy Award for Best Film Editing, Saturn Award for Best Editing, ACE Eddie Award for Best Edited Feature Film
- Honours: Camerimage Award to an Editor with Unique Visual Sensitivity

Paul Frederick Hirsch (born November 14, 1945) is an American film editor with over 40 film credits since 1970, best known as one of the premier filmmakers to come out of the New Hollywood movement, collaborating with directors like Brian De Palma, George Lucas, George A. Romero, and Herbert Ross. He won an Academy Award and Saturn Award for his work on the original Star Wars, which he shared with Richard Chew and Marcia Lucas.

== Life and career ==
Hirsch is a native of New York City, and the son of painter Joseph Hirsch. His father was of German-Jewish descent. After graduating from Columbia in 1966, he began to pursue a career in editing. In the late 1960s, while editing trailers in NYC, he was introduced by his brother, Charles, to then unknown filmmaker Brian De Palma. Their collaboration has yielded eleven feature films.

In 1978, he won the Academy Award for Best Film Editing for his work on Star Wars, along with Richard Chew and Marcia Lucas. He was also the first person to win the Saturn Award for Best Editing twice, first for Star Wars in 1977 and then Mission: Impossible – Ghost Protocol in 2011.

He has edited over 35 feature films, including The Empire Strikes Back, Ferris Bueller's Day Off, Mission: Impossible, Planes, Trains and Automobiles, Footloose, Carrie, Falling Down, Phantom of the Paradise, Obsession, Blow Out, The Secret of My Success, Steel Magnolias and Ray, for which he received a second Academy Award nomination in 2005 and the American Cinema Editors' award for Best Edited Feature Film (Comedy or Musical). He has also worked with Duncan Jones on Source Code and Warcraft.

Hirsch rarely watches movies other than his own more than once. However, he cites that the musical An American in Paris and the science fiction film 2001: A Space Odyssey are worthy of repeat viewing.

== Filmography ==
=== As film editor ===
Year	Film	Director	Notes
1970	Hi, Mom!	Brian De Palma	
1972	Sisters	Brian De Palma	
1974	Phantom of the Paradise	Brian De Palma	
1976	Carrie	Brian De Palma	
1976	Obsession	Brian De Palma	
1977	Star Wars	George Lucas	Co-editor with Marcia Lucas & Richard Chew Academy Award for Best Film Editing; Saturn Award for Best Editing; Nominated—BAFTA Award for Best Editing; Nominated—ACE Eddie for Best Edited Feature Film
1978	King of the Gypsies	Frank Pierson	
1978	The Fury	Brian De Palma	
1980	The Empire Strikes Back	Irvin Kershner	
1981	Blow Out	Brian De Palma	
1982	Creepshow	George A. Romero	Segment: "The Crate"
1983	The Black Stallion Returns	Robert Dalva	
1984	Footloose	Herbert Ross	
1986	Ferris Bueller's Day Off	John Hughes	
1987	Planes, Trains and Automobiles	John Hughes	
1987	The Secret of My Success	Herbert Ross	
1989	Steel Magnolias	Herbert Ross	
1990	Coupe de Ville	Joe Roth	
1991	Dutch	Peter Faiman	Co-editor with Adam Bernardi & Rick Shaine
1992	Raising Cain	Brian De Palma	Co-editor with Robert Dalva & Bonnie Koehler
1993	Falling Down	Joel Schumacher	
1993	Wrestling Ernest Hemingway	Randa Haines	
1994	I Love Trouble	Charles Shyer	Co-editor with Adam Bernardi & Walter Murch
1996	Mission: Impossible	Brian De Palma	Nominated—Awards Circuit Community Award for Best Editing; Nominated—Satellite Award for Best Editing
1998	Hard Rain	Mikael Salomon	Co-edited with Amnon David and Gillian L. Hutshing
1998	Mighty Joe Young	Ron Underwood	
1999	Lake Placid	Steve Miner	Co-edited with Marshall Harvey
2000	Mission to Mars	Brian De Palma	
2002	The Adventures of Pluto Nash	Ron Underwood	Co-edited with Alan Heim
2003	The Fighting Temptations	Jonathan Lynn	
2004	Ray	Taylor Hackford	ACE Eddie for Best Edited Feature film – Comedy or Musical; Nominated—Academy Award for Best Film Editing
2006	Date Movie	Aaron Seltzer	
2006	Deck the Halls	John Whitesell	
2008	Righteous Kill	Jon Avnet	
2010	Love Ranch	Taylor Hackford	
2011	Source Code	Duncan Jones	
2011	Dylan Dog: Dead of Night	Kevin Munroe	
2011	Mission: Impossible – Ghost Protocol	Brad Bird	Saturn Award for Best Editing
2016	Warcraft	Duncan Jones	
2017	The Mummy	Alex Kurtzman	Co-editor with Gina Hirsch & Andrew Mondshein

=== As additional editor ===
Year	Film	Director	Editor(s)	Notes
1979	Home Movies	Brian De Palma	Corky O'Hara	
1986	The Clan of the Cave Bear	Michael Chapman	Wendy Greene Bricmont	
2002	Extreme Ops	Christian Duguay	Clive Barrett; Sylvain Lebel	
2007	Lions for Lambs	Robert Redford	Joe Hutshing	
2012	Life of Pi	Ang Lee	Tim Squyres	Uncredited
2013	The Great Gatsby	Baz Luhrmann	Jason Ballantine; Jonathan Redmond; Matt Villa	
2013	World War Z	Marc Forster	Roger Barton; Matt Chessé	
2018	The Nutcracker and the Four Realms	Lasse Hallström; Joe Johnston	Stuart Levy	
