= Teodoro Núñez Ureta =

Peruvian painter and writer

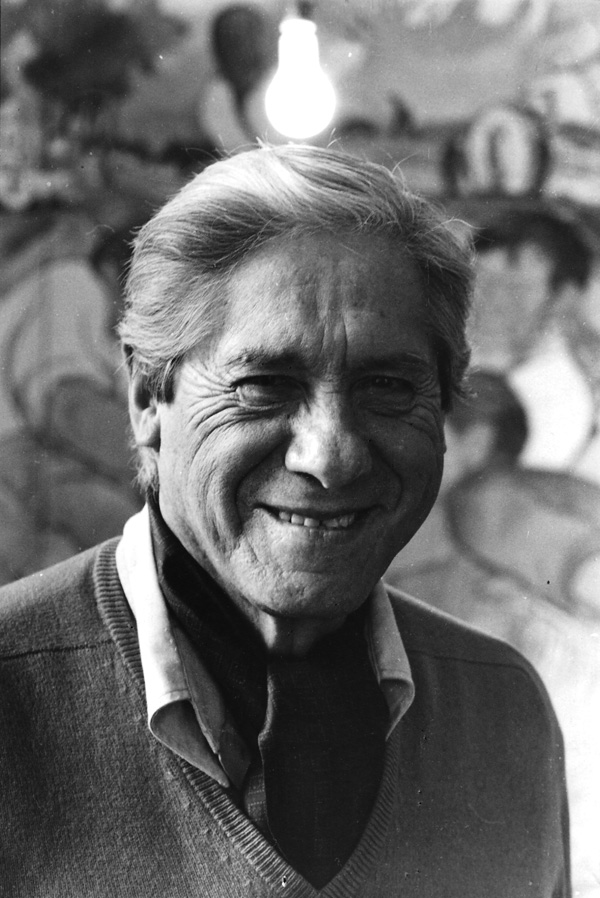
- Teodoro Núñez Ureta in 1982.
- Born: Teodoro Núñez Ureta; 1912; Arequipa, Peru
- Died: 1988 (aged 75–76); Lima, Peru
- Occupations: Painter, writer, educator, academic administrator

Teodoro Núñez Ureta (1912–1988) was a Peruvian painter and a writer, noted for an original and distinctive style in Latin American art. His work often celebrated the life of the simple people of the Andes and the countryside, as distinct from a Spanish colonial legacy which had tended to ignore such topics.

== Biography ==
Teodoro Núñez Ureta was born in 1912, in the provincial city of Arequipa, Peru. He was a child of a poor family. He began to learn to draw and paint on his own.

His talent was discovered and nurtured at the Centro Artístico de Arequipa under Jose G. Alvarez. He became a professor and ultimately held the Chair of Art History and Aesthetics (1936–1950), at the Faculty of Arts of the Universidad Nacional de San Agustin Universidad Nacional de San Agustín de Arequipa. His costumbrista article "La Abuela" (The Grandmother) won him a National Journalism Award in 1943. His unique talents drew attention throughout Peru, especially in the national capital. Lima was more cosmopolitan than Arequipa, with an expatriate European contingent among its elite; this provided Núñez Ureta's reputation a conduit to international recognition. Art patrons Federico and Alice Gulda introduced him to art and literary circles abroad. This led to sponsorship of the John Simon Guggenheim Memorial Foundation in 1943, and travels around the United States in (1943–1944). His book "The Academy and Modern Art" followed in (1945). Núñez-Ureta established himself in Lima from 1950. In 1959, he won the Ignacio Merino National Prize of Culture.

He was director of the National Superior Autonomous School of Fine Arts, Lima (1973–1976), and president of the National Association of Writers and Artists (1978–1980). During his lifetime he traveled often, exhibiting his work throughout Latin America, North America, Europe and the former Soviet Union. He was Peru's best known muralist and painted Diego Rivera-like murals in Lima's Ministry of Education and Finance. He published "Siqueiros" (1976) and "Contemporary Peruvian painting" in two volumes (1975–1976). His story "La Waytacha" (1980) was translated into Russian, English and Bulgarian. Through poetic symbolism it presents the frustrations of a poor farmer who migrates to the city, only to suffer a constant yearning for his native land; the story represents a dominant Latin American social phenomenon. "The Life of the People" (1982), was an exhibition of 68 watercolors and 35 drawings intended to depict and criticize social customs. He traveled to Sofia in 1980 at invitation of UNESCO to be decorated by the Circle of Writers and Artists of Bulgaria. Núñez-Ureta's politics were populist and leftist, but with a strongly humanitarian bent, which endeared him particularly to the Non-Aligned countries during the Détente era.

In the 1980s, his country declared him "Hijo Predilecto" (Favored Son) and awarded him a "Golden Texao." His native city of Arequipa awarded him its Gold Medal and the City of Lima its Civic Medal (1985). His career continued to earn the recognition of the Peruvian State. His country awarded him its highest honor, the Orden del Sol, with Grand Cross (1982); Medal of Congress with the Grade of Commander (1982) and Las Palmas Magisteriales, with the degree of Amauta (1988). The Fondo Editorial of the Congress of the Republic of Peru has published a compilation of his works, Lucy Nunez Rebaza editor .

== See also ==
- List of Guggenheim Fellowships awarded in 1943
