= Joseph Hirsch =

American painter (1910–1981)

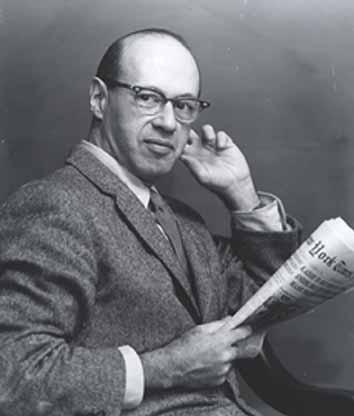
- Born: 25 April 1910; Philadelphia, Pennsylvania, U.S.
- Died: 21 September 1981 (aged 71); New York City, U.S.
- Known for: paintings, lithographs, posters
- Movement: Social Realism
- Children: 3, including Paul Hirsch
- Awards: Lippincott Prize, PAFA (1934); 3rd Hallgarten Prize, NAD (1934); Woolley Fellowship (1935); Pennell Purchase Prize, LOC (1942 & 1943); Guggenheim Fellowship (1942 & 1943); 2nd Carnegie Prize, CMA (1947); Fulbright Fellowship (1949 & 1950); Blair Prize, AIC (1951); 4th Prize, MMA (1951); Hassam Purchase Fund, AAAL (1955, 1961, 1962 & 1963); Altman Prize, NAD (1959, 1967 & 1978); Carnegie Prize, CMA (1968)

Joseph Hirsch (1910–1981) was an American painter, illustrator, muralist and teacher. Social commentary was the backbone of Hirsch's art, especially works depicting civic corruption and racial injustice.

His works are in the Metropolitan Museum of Art, the Museum of Modern Art, the Whitney Museum of American Art, the Smithsonian American Art Museum, and many other museums.

== Early life and education ==
The son of physician Charles S. Hirsch and Fannie Wittenberg, he was of German-Jewish heritage and grew up in Philadelphia, Pennsylvania. Hirsch attended Philadelphia public schools and Central High School. At age 17, he entered the Pennsylvania Museum and School of Industrial Art (now the University of the Arts), where he was instructed in the Philadelphia realist tradition of Thomas Eakins. After graduation, he studied privately with George Luks in New York City (1932–33). Luks had been a founder of the Ashcan School and one of "The Eight," a group of painters who depicted everyday scenes of urban life. He introduced Hirsch to the Social Realism movement.

Following Luks's 1933 death, Hirsch studied further with Henry Hensche in Provincetown, Massachusetts (Summers 1934 & 1935). A 1935 Woolley Fellowship from the Institute of International Education enabled him to travel throughout Europe for more than a year, and he returned to the United States in November 1936, by way of Egypt, Asia and the Pacific Ocean.

== Career ==
In the late 1930s, Hirsch worked in Philadelphia as an artist in the easel painting division of the Works Project Administration. He painted murals for the Amalgamated Clothing Workers of America Office Building at 2113-27 South Street; for the Family Court Building at 1801 Vine Street; and for the Benjamin Franklin High School at Broad & Green Streets (now demolished).

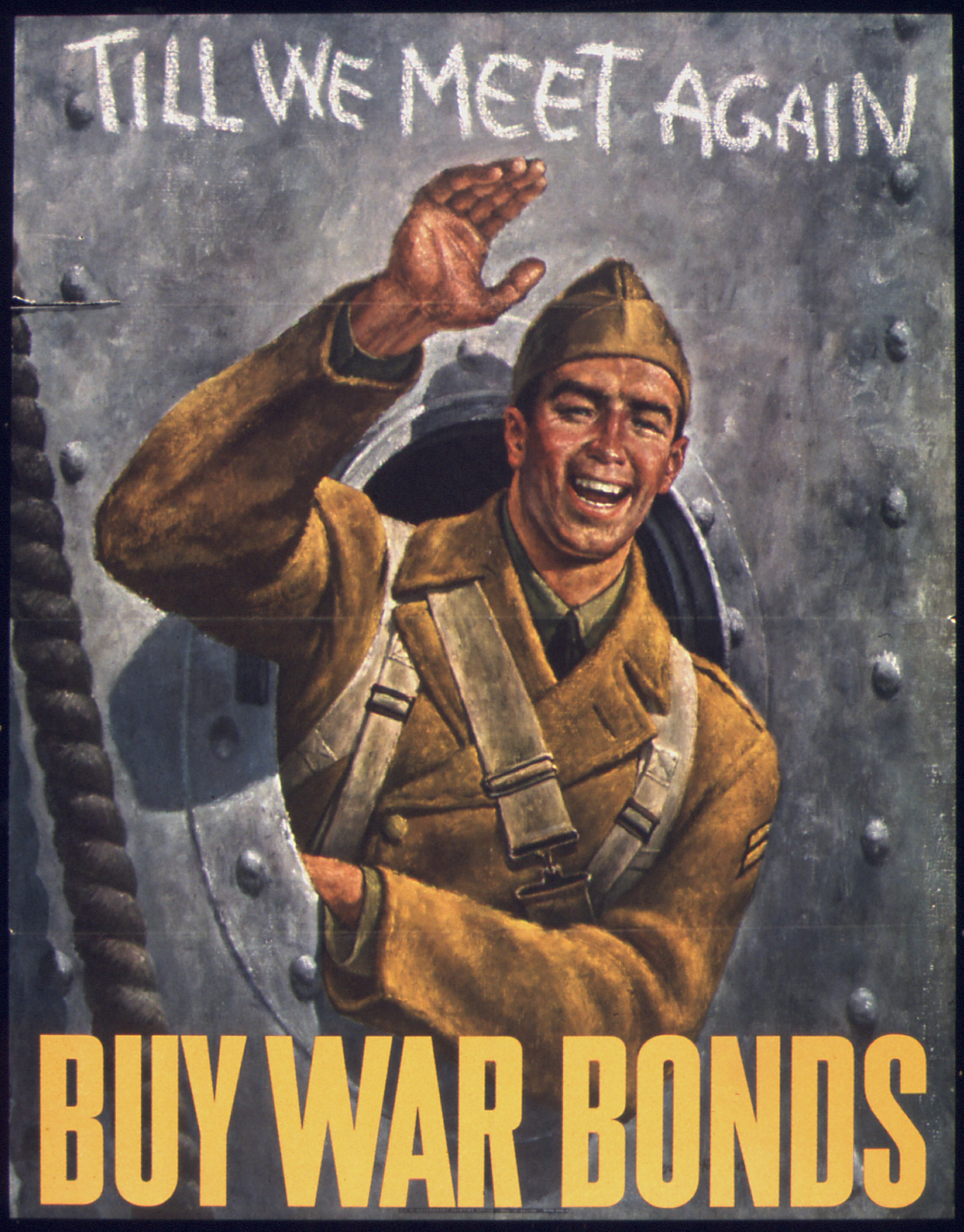
Till We Meet Again poster (1942)

During World War II, his image of a smiling and waving soldier shipping out, Till We Meet Again (1942), was the most popular War Bond poster. In 1942–1943, he was embedded as an artist/war correspondent with naval airmen in Florida, then with the U.S. Navy Medical Corps in the South Pacific. In 1944, he was embedded with the U.S. Army Medical Corps in North Africa and Italy. Some of his most powerful war paintings depict wounded soldiers being removed from the battlefield.

The three trips I went on had to do with naval air training at Pensacola, Florida; then naval medicine in the Pacific; and army medicine in Italy and North Africa. It was hard and unforgettable and lonely and sometimes frustrating running into the real McCoy. I was of course moved most by the two medical assignments because I saw wounded kids. It was a very good experience. You know, talking with — I saw soldiers in more hospitals — I had been in many hospitals in Philadelphia as my father was a doctor. I also visited a hospital ship. To see the kind of organized spirit of cooperation was — I don't know what the Navy's Medical Corps is like now, but at that time during the war to see a lot of wonderful improvisation made for material for good sketching and painting and drawing. The majority of the work was done immediately upon my return. I'd go out for a couple of months and come back and spend another three or four months doing perhaps a dozen paintings and as many drawings both for the aviation series and the naval medicine, and the Army medical.

In my painting I want to castigate the things I hate and paint monuments to what I feel is noble. — Joseph Hirsch

Hirsh often used an intimate scene to suggest the enormous emotion of a subject: The Lynch Family (1946) depicts a young black mother holding a baby, distraught at the murder of her husband. The painting was published as an illustration in the Communist journal The New Masses, following the July 1946 lynching of two black men and their wives in Monroe, Georgia. The Burden (1947) depicts an overwhelmed American GI installing white cross gravemarkers in a military cemetery, while in the background a second GI unloads yet another jeep-full. Hirsch's poster for the original 1949 Broadway production of Arthur Miller's Death of a Salesman depicts a beaten-down Willy Loman trudging onward with his heavy suitcases.

Hirsch occasionally explored Christian themes. His version of The Crucifixion (1945) is a closeup view from behind, and focuses on the busy workman preparing to nail Jesus's hand to the cross. The Journey (ca.1948), painted as a Christmas card for Hallmark Cards, depicts the Flight into Egypt, and presents Mary and Joseph in modern dress on the back of a donkey—with Joseph holding a trombone! Supper (1963–1964) depicts 12 vagrant men seated around a table in what appears to be a soup kitchen. The painting's name and the number of men recall The Last Supper.

Hirsch also worked as a commercial artist and portrait painter. He produced dozens of lithographs, most based on his paintings, and described himself as a "full-time painter and a Sunday lithographer." Among his popular lithographs were Lunch Hour (1942), depicting a black youth asleep at his school desk; Banquet (1945), a closeup of a black man and an old white man sitting side by side at a lunch counter; and a color lithograph of the Boston Tea Party, published at the time of the 1976 Bicentennial. The U.S. Bureau of Reclamation commissioned him in the late-1960s to create illustrations documenting construction of the Soldier Creek Dam (completed 1974), in Wasatch County, Utah.

In his mature period, the 1960s and 1970s, Hirsch used a series of layered planes to compose a painting. Typically, these planes were parallel to the picture plane, with depth suggested by receding figures, rather than through lines of perspective. These paintings appear to be snapshots, capturing people in mid-action, not posing.

Hirsch taught at the School of the Art Institute of Chicago (1947–1948), the American Art School of New York University (1948–1949), the National Academy of Design (1959–1967), and the Art Students League of New York (1967–1981). He was an artist-in-residence at the University of Utah (Summer 1959, 1975), Utah State University (year), Dartmouth College (Spring 1966), and Brigham Young University (1971).

=== McCarthyism ===
Hirsch was a founding member of Artists Equity, an organization modeled on Actors Equity, created to protect the rights of visual artists. Artists Equity began in New York City in 1949, and grew to have chapters in dozens of U.S. cities. Hirsch was awarded a Fulbright Fellowship to study and work in Paris for a year, and he and his family arrived in France in September 1949. Even prior to Senator Joseph McCarthy's notorious February 1950 declaration that hundreds of known Communists were working in the U.S. State Department, the political climate in the United States was becoming hostile to those holding leftist views. Hirsch's Fulbright was renewed, but, as the end of its second year approached, he sold his house on Cape Cod to extend his family's stay in Paris.

Michigan Congressman George Anthony Dondero denounced Artists Equity as a front organization for Communists in a March 17, 1952 speech – "Communist Conspiracy in Art Threatens American Museums" – delivered on the floor of the U.S. House of Representatives. A number of Artists Equity member artists were blacklisted. Expatriate Hirsch was later denounced as a Communist sympathizer, and public pressure was put on the Dallas Museum of Art to remove his award-winning Nine Men (1949) from an exhibition. Instead, the museum moved Nine Men, a painting by Mexican former-Communist Diego Rivera, and one by German former-Communist George Grosz into a separate room, and invited museumgoers to judge the political influence for themselves. The Hirschs did not return to the United States until 1955.

== Exhibitions, awards & honors ==
Hirsch exhibited regularly in the annual exhibitions of the Pennsylvania Academy of the Fine Arts and the National Academy of Design. He exhibited seventeen canvases in a 1942 Museum of Modern Art exhibition—Americans 1942: 18 Artists from 9 States (MoMA, January 21 to March 8, 1942), and exhibited in eleven other MoMA exhibitions. One of Hirsch's war paintings was included in the Artists for Victory exhibition, that began at the Corcoran Gallery of Art in late 1944, and toured the country.

PAFA awarded Hirsch the 1934 Walter Lippincott Prize (best figure painting exhibited by an American artist) for Masseur Tom, a life-size full-length portrait of an imposing Turkish masseur. Masseur Tom also won him the 1934 Third Hallgarten Prize (best figure painting exhibited by an American artist under age 30) from NAD. The public voted Two Men (1937) the best contemporary American painting exhibited at the 1939 New York World's Fair. A depiction of a black man and a white man having an amicable disagreement, Two Men is in the permanent collection of MoMA. The Library of Congress twice awarded him the Joseph Pennell Purchase Prize for lithography: 1944 for Lunch Hour, and 1945 for The Confidence. The Art Institute of Chicago awarded him the 1951 Blair Prize for Nine Men. The Metropolitan Museum of Art held its first annual exhibition in 1951, and awarded him Fourth Prize for Nine Men, the only non-abstract painting among the winners. The Childe Hassam Purchase Fund of the American Academy of Arts and Letters purchased four of his paintings, beginning with The Burden in 1955. The Crucifixion won him the Butler Institute of American Art's 1964 purchase prize, and the painting remains BIAA's permanent collection. NAD awarded him the Altman Prize (best figure painting exhibited by an American artist) three times: 1959 for The Book, 1966 for [work], and 1978 for Tuba. The Carnegie Museum of Art awarded him the 1947 Carnegie Second Prize for The Iceman, and the 1968 Carnegie Prize for [work].

Hirsch was runner-up for the 1935 Rome Prize. He received two Guggenheim Fellowships (1942 & 1943), and two Fulbright Fellowships (1949 & 1950). He was elected an Associate member of the National Academy of Design in 1954, and a full Academician in 1958. He was elected to the National Institute of Arts and Letters in 1967. He was a member (and later a trustee) of the Century Association.

== Personal life ==
In 1938, Hirsch married fellow Philadelphian Ruth Schindler (1912–2000), a dancer who had trained under Martha Graham. They moved to New York City in 1940, and had two sons together, Charles and Paul. The Hirsch family moved to France in 1949, and the couple divorced soon after their return to the United States in 1955. The following year, he married Genevieve Baucheron (1926–2011). They had one son together, Frederic.

== Selected works ==
Hero (c.1939-40), Smithsonian American Art Museum

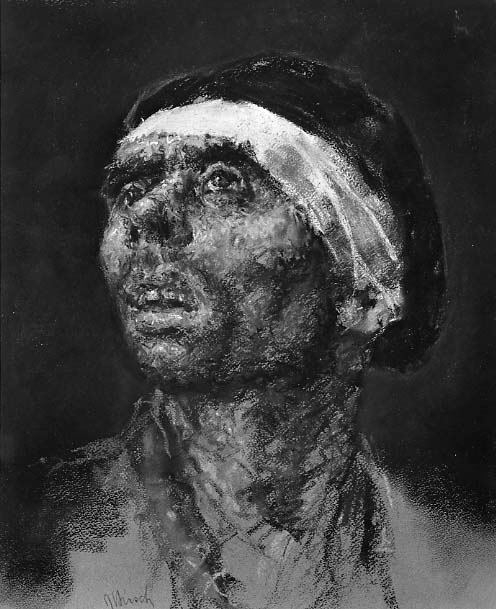
Air Raid (c.1940), Metropolitan Museum of Art

- Moonlight (1937), Whitney Museum of American Art, New York City. Depicts a corpse-strewn battlefield by night.
- Two Men (1937), Museum of Modern Art, New York City. Exhibited at the 1939 New York World's Fair.
- Hercules Killing the Hydra (ca.1937), Smithsonian American Art Museum, Washington, D.C. Depicts a policeman beating striking workers with a billy club.
- Street Scene (1938), Fred Jones Jr. Museum of Art, University of Oklahoma—Norman. Depicts 4 men huddled together on a steam grate in the snow.
- Portrait of an Old Man (1939), Museum of Fine Arts, Boston, Massachusetts
- Hero (Veteran Selling Poppies) (ca.1939-40), Smithsonian American Art Museum, Washington, D.C. Depicts a uniformed World War I veteran selling Memorial Day poppies on a city sidewalk.
- Air Raid (ca.1940), Metropolitan Museum of Art, New York City
- The Senator (1941), Whitney Museum of American Art, New York City
- The Prisoner (1942), Whitney Museum of American Art, New York City
- Lunch Hour (1942), lithograph, Library of Congress, Washington, D.C. Awarded the 1944 Pennell Purchase Prize, and still in the LOC's permanent collection.
- Portrait of Somerset Maugham (1942). Exhibited at MoMA, 1942. Honorable mention, Art Institute of Chicago, 1942 annual exhibition.
- The Crucifixion (1945), Butler Institute of American Art, Youngstown Ohio
- The Survivor (1945), Columbus Museum of Art, Columbus, Ohio
- Winter (1945), Hood Museum of Art, Dartmouth College, Hanover, New Hampshire
- Banquet (1945), lithograph, Carnegie Museum of Art, Pittsburgh, Pennsylvania
- The Lynch Family (1946), Nelson-Atkins Museum of Art, Kansas City, Missouri
- The Burden (1947), American Academy of Arts and Letters, New York City
- The Journey (ca.1948), Hallmark Art Collection, Kansas City, Missouri
- Nine Men (1949), Smithsonian American Art Museum, Washington, D.C. Awarded the 1951 Blair Prize from the Art Institute of Chicago; and the 1951 4th Prize from the Metropolitan Museum of Art.
- Clown with Mask (1949), Hirshhorn Museum and Sculpture Garden, Washington, D.C.
- Patriobats (1949), Hirshhorn Museum and Sculpture Garden, Washington, D.C.
- Birthday (1949–50), Hirshhorn Museum and Sculpture Garden, Washington, D.C.
- The Widow (1952–53), Addison Gallery of American Art, Phillips Academy, Andover, Massachusetts
- The Shower (1953), Addison Gallery of American Art, Phillips Academy, Andover, Massachusetts
- The Room (1958), Metropolitan Museum of Art, New York City
- The Naked Man (ca.1959-60), Smithsonian American Art Museum, Washington, D.C. Depicts a naked draftee carrying his newly-issued uniforms and boots.
- Guerillas (ca.1960), Harry S. Truman Presidential Library and Museum, Independence, Missouri
- Doorway (ca.1961), American Academy of Arts and Letters, New York City
- Monument (ca.1962), American Academy of Arts and Letters, New York City
- Interior with Figures (1962), Whitney Museum of American Art, New York City
- Motorcycles (ca.1963), American Academy of Arts and Letters, New York City
- Supper (1963–64), Columbus Museum of Art, Columbus, Ohio.
- Broth (ca.1964), Smithsonian American Art Museum, Washington, D.C.
- Deposition (1967), Cranbrook Art Museum, Bloomfield Hills, Michigan
- Tuba (1971), National Academy of Design, New York City
- Daniel (Belshazzar's Feast) (ca.1976-77), Montgomery Museum of Fine Arts, Montgomery, Alabama
- Father Killer Whale and Daughter (no date), Whitney Museum of American Art, New York City

=== World War II ===
- U.S. Naval Historical Center, Washington, D.C.
  - Transportation, Latest Mode (ca.1943)
  - Blasting Mosquito Infested Swamps (ca.1943)
  - Heave Away (ca.1943)
  - Mercy Ship (ca.1943)
  - Satisfaction Plus (ca.1943)
  - Making the Buoy (ca.1943)
  - Back from Patrol (ca.1943)
  - Eyes of the Fleet (ca.1943)
  - Ready on the Line (ca.1943)
  - Onto the Ramp (ca.1943)
  - Man of the Hour (ca.1943)

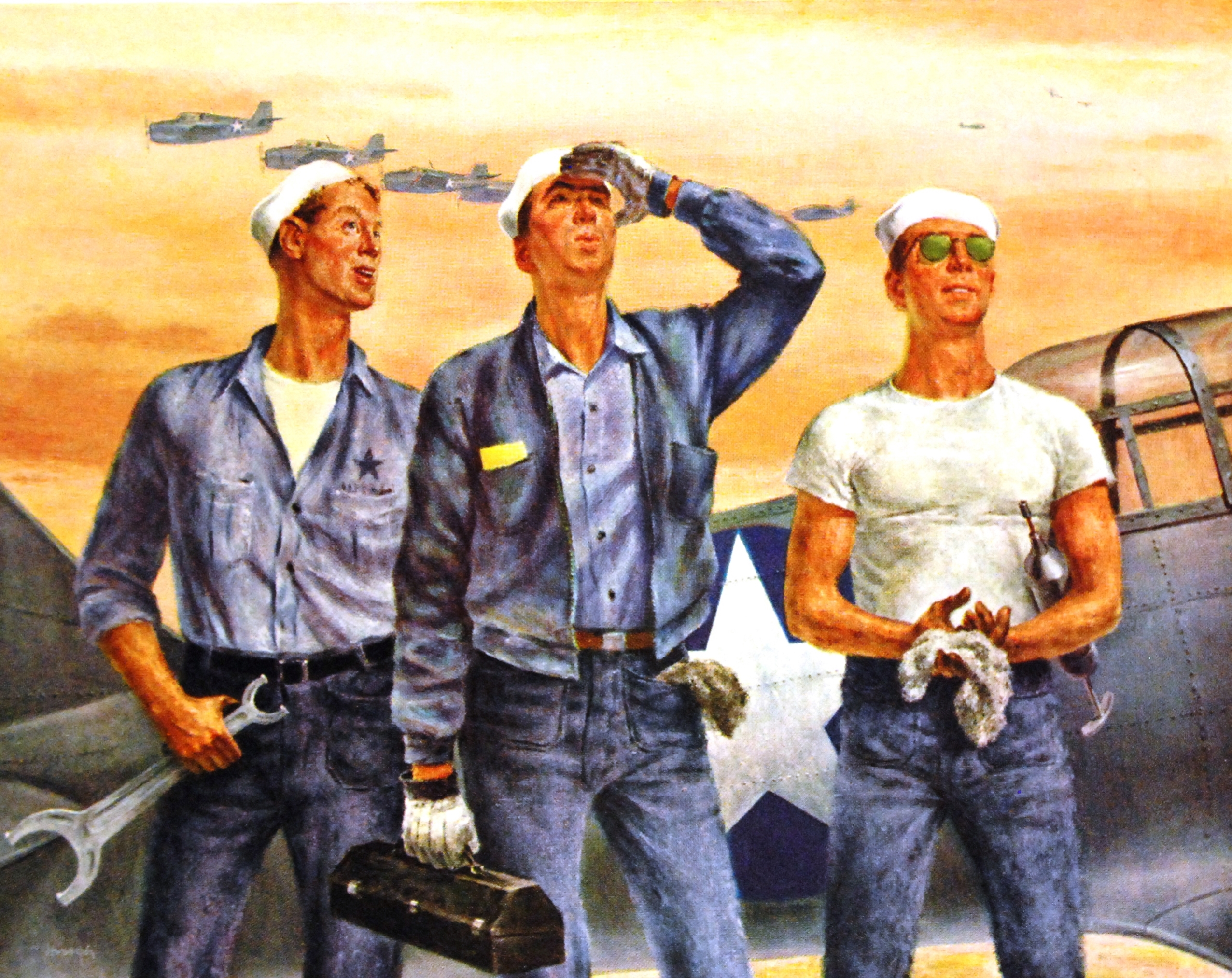
Satisfaction Plus (ca.1943)

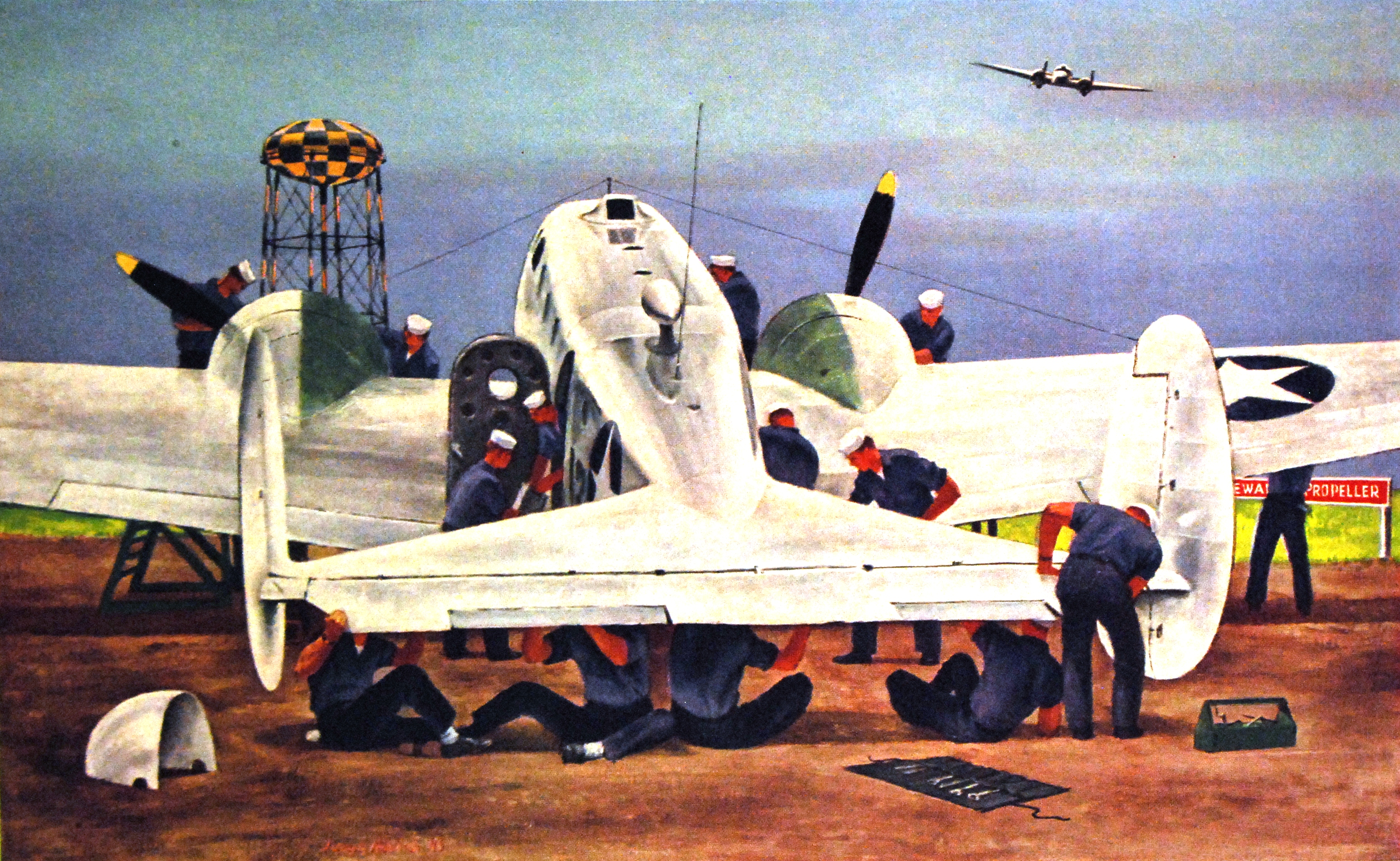
Ready on the Line (ca.1943)

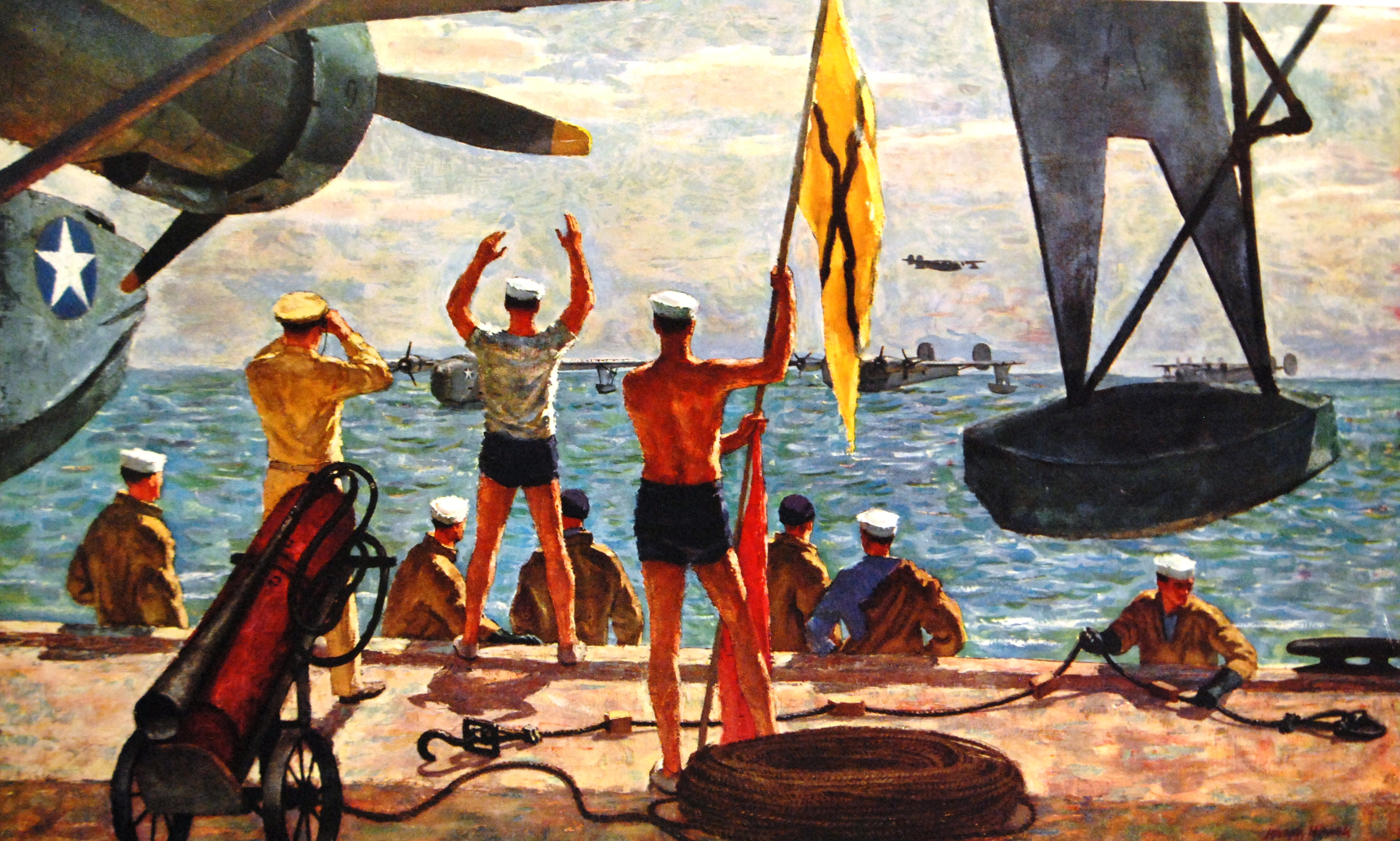
Making the Buoy (ca.1943)

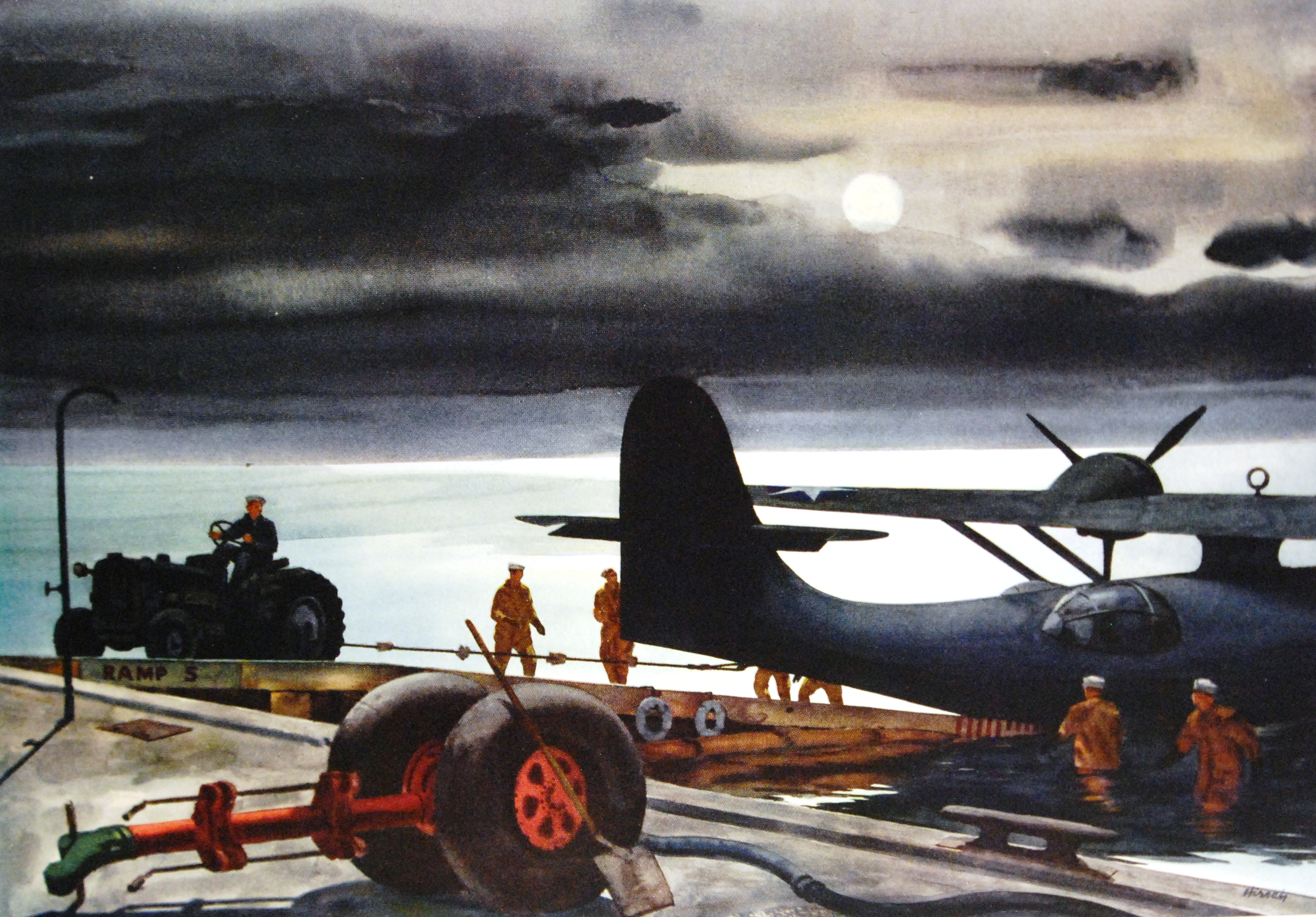
Onto the Ramp (ca.1943)
- U.S. Army Center of Military History, Washington, D.C.
  - Company in the Parlor (1944). A makeshift hospital set up in the ruins of a church.
  - High Visibility Wrap (1944)
  - Night Shift (1944)
  - Field Examination (1944)
  - Hospital for Allied Wounded (1944)
  - After the Fascist Fair (1944)
  - Bringing in the Ammo (1944)
  - Italian Rush Hour (1944)
  - Nurse in Newfoundland (1944)
  - All Aboard Home (1944)

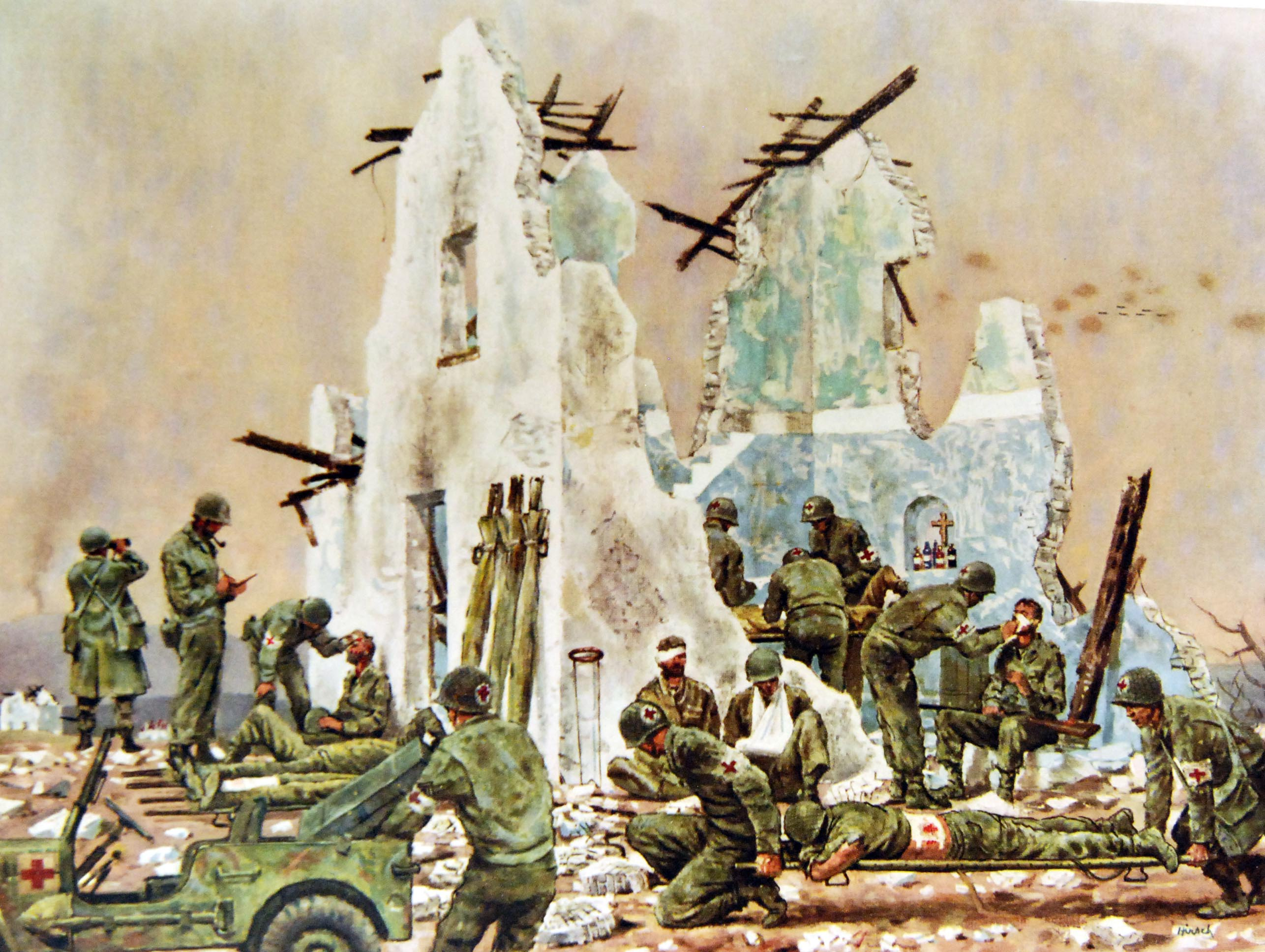
Company in the Parlor (1944)

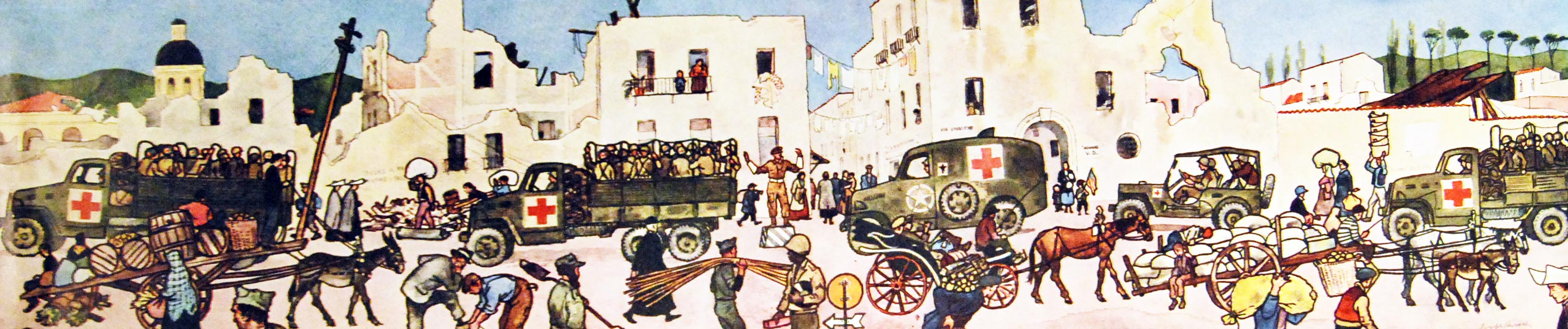
Italian Rush Hour (1944)

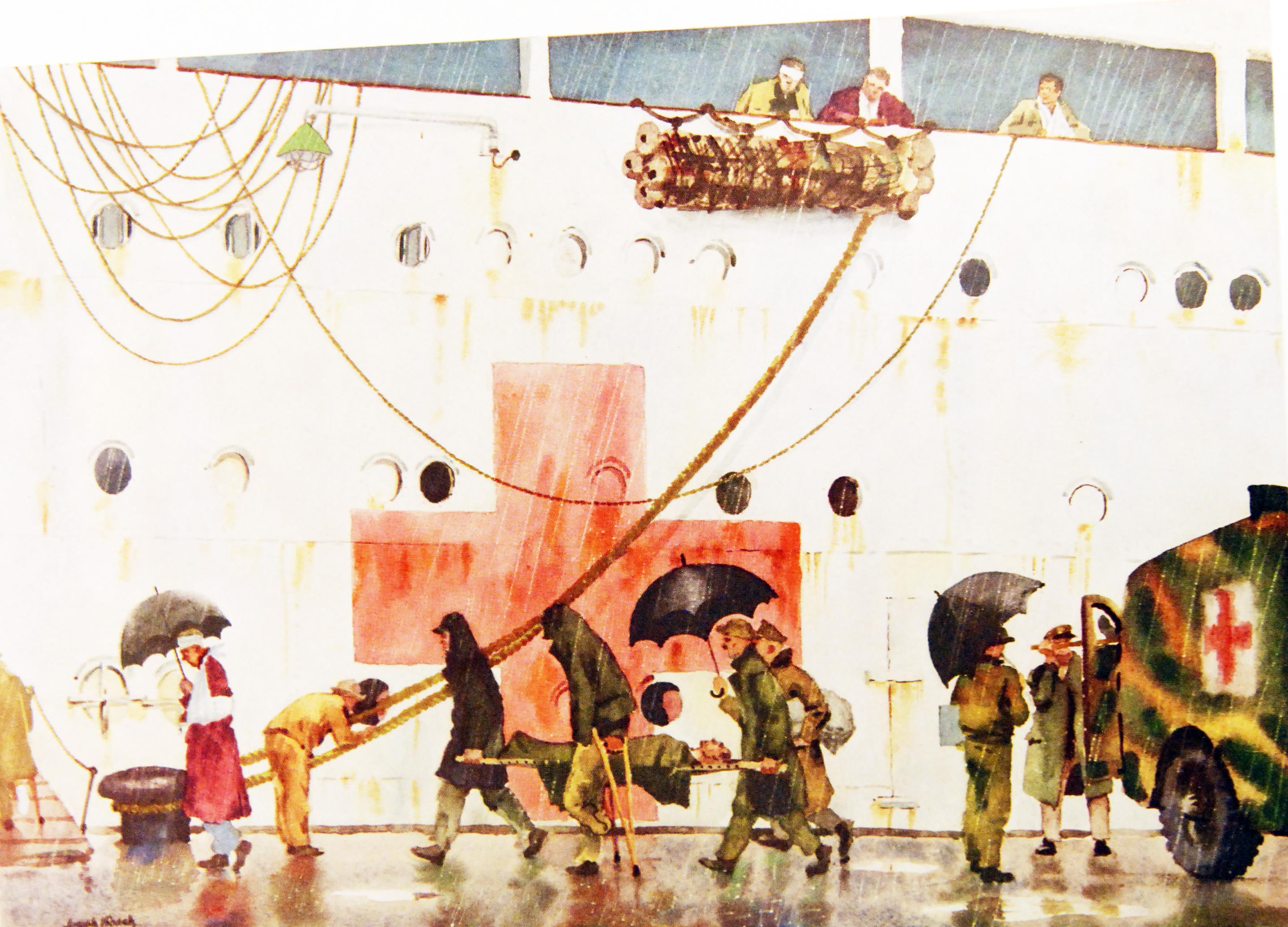
All Aboard Home (1944)

=== Murals ===
- History of the Amalgamated Clothing Workers of America (1938), ACWA Office Building, Philadelphia, Pennsylvania. An enormous mural – 11 ft x 65 ft (3.6 m x 19.8 m) – covering 3 walls of the lobby, Hirsch painted it on his own in 5 weeks. The building has been converted into apartments, the lobby is now a City Fitness gym, and the mural is hidden behind mirrors.
- 3-part mural: Child Labor, Adoption, Child Education (1938–39), Courtroom C, Family Court Building, Philadelphia, Pennsylvania
