= Dixon Wecter =

American historian

- Born: January 12, 1906; Houston, Texas, U.S.
- Died: June 24, 1950 (aged 44); Sacramento, California, U.S.
- Education: Baylor University; Yale University
- Occupation: Historian
- Spouse: Elizabeth Farrar

Dixon Wecter (January 12, 1906 – June 24, 1950) was an American historian. He was "the first professor of American History" at the University of Sydney, and the Margaret Byrne Professor of United States History at the University of California, Berkeley. He was the author of more than three books.

== Early life ==
Wecter was born on January 12, 1906, in Houston, Texas, the son of Eugenia (née Dixon) and John Joseph Wecter. He graduated from Baylor University, where he earned a bachelor's degree in 1925. He earned a master's degree from Yale University in 1926, attended the University of Oxford's Merton College as a Rhodes Scholar between 1928 and 1930, and he earned a PhD from Yale University in 1936.

== Career ==
Wecter joined the English faculty at the University of Colorado Boulder in 1936, and he became a tenured associate professor in 1936. He was an English professor at the University of California, Los Angeles from 1939 to 1945. During those years, he was also a research fellow at the Huntington Library in 1939–1940, and a Guggenheim Fellow in 1942–1943.

Wecter became "the first professor of American history" at the University of Sydney in 1945. He was finally appointed as the Margaret Byrne Professor of United States History at the University of California, Berkeley in 1949–1950.

Wecter succeeded Bernard DeVoto as Editor of the Mark Twain Literary Estate.

Wecter was the author of more than three books, including one about Edmund Burke.

== Personal life and death ==
Wecter married Elizabeth Farrar in 1937.

Wecter died on June 23, 1950, in Sacramento, California.

== Selected works ==
- Wecter, Dixon (1937). The Saga of American Society: A Record of Social Aspiration, 1607–1937. New York: Charles Scribner's Sons. OCLC 889585904.
- Wecter, Dixon (1939). Edmund Burke and his Kinsmen: A Study of the Statesman's Financial Integrity and Private Relationships. Boulder, Colorado: University of Colorado Press. OCLC 1866309.
- Wecter, Dixon (1941). The Hero in America: A Chronicle of Hero-Worship. New York: Charles Scribner's Sons. OCLC 516153 – via archive.org. ISBN 9780684129938
- Wecter, Dixon (1944). When Johnny Comes Marching Home. Houghton Mifflin.
- Wecter, Dixon (1949). The Love Letters Of Mark Twain. New York: Harper and Brothers – via archive.org.
- Twain, Mark (1949). Wecter, Dixon (ed.). Mark Twain to Mrs. Fairbanks. San Marino, California: Huntington Library – via archive.org.
- Wecter, Dixon (1952). Sam Clemens of Hannibal. Boston: Houghton Mifflin – via archive.org.
