= A. S. P. Woodhouse =

Canadian academic

Arthur Sutherland Pigott Woodhouse (1895–1964) was a Canadian professor of English at the University of Toronto, a leading authority on the works and times of the English Poet John Milton.

== Biography ==
Woodhouse was born in Port Hope, Ontario 27 September 1895. As a boy he spent 10 years in England, before returning to Ontario and completed his secondary education at the Collegiate Institute, Barrie. He attended University of Toronto and graduated with a B.A. in 1919. He was a Townsend Scholar at Harvard Graduate School and graduated with an A.M. in 1922. Although he studied for a doctorate, due to teaching commitments and a lack of interest in some of the modules he failed to obtain one from Harvard.

Woodhouse spent five years at the Department of English at the University of Manitoba where he taught eighteenth-century literature, the literature of Milton, Victorian Thought and the History of Criticism. In 1944 he joined the University of Toronto as head of both the college and the graduate departments. He edited The University of Toronto Quarterly for 13 years. He died on 31 October 1964.

Woodhouse was a leading authority on the work and times of the English Poet John Milton. He received many honours, including a Guggenheim Fellowship in 1942 and an honorary Dr. Litt. from Acadia University in 1948.

== Bibliography ==
Woodhose published two books:

- Woodhouse, A.S.P., ed. (1950) [1938], Puritanism and liberty: being the Army Debates (1647–9) from the Clarke Manuscripts with supplementary documents (2nd ed.), London: University of Chicago Press, foreword by A.D. Lindsay.
- Milton the Poet, Toronto: J.M. Dent, 1955

Other publications include:

- Crawford, A.W.; Perry, and, Aaron J.; Woodhouse, A.S.P., eds. (1929), Greater English poets, Toronto: Macmillan
- Kirkconnell, Watson; Woodhouse, A.S.P. (1947), The humanities in Canada, Ottawa: Humanities Research Council of Canada
- Woodhouse, A.S.P. (1949), Nature and grace in The faerie queene, Baltimore
- Woodhouse, A.S.P. (1949), Notes on Milton's views on the creation: the initial phases, Iowa City State University
- Woodhouse, A.S.P. (1951), Romanticism and the history of ideas, vol. Section 2, London: Oxford University Press
- Woodhouse, A.S.P.; et al. (1960), Four essays, University of Toronto Press
- Woodhouse, A.S.P. (1965), The poet and his faith: religion and poetry in England from Spenser to Eliot and Auden, University of Chicago Press
- Woodhouse, A.S.P. (1972), MacCallum, Hugh (ed.), The heavenly muse; a preface to Milton, University of Toronto Press

See also:

- MacLure, Millar; Watt, F.W., eds. (1964), Essays in English literature from the Renaissance to the Victorian Age: presented to A.S.P. Woodhouse, Toronto University Press
