= University of California, Davis =

American public research university

- Former names: University Farm (1905–1922); Northern Branch of the College of Agriculture (1922–1938); College of Agriculture at Davis (1938–1959)
- Motto: Fiat lux (Latin)
- Motto in English: "Let there be light"
- Type: Public land-grant research university
- Established: March 18, 1905; 121 years ago (1959 as a general UC campus)
- Parent institution: University of California
- Accreditation: WSCUC
- Academic affiliations: AAU; APRU; U21; URA; space-grant
- Endowment: $770.4 million (2024)
- Budget: $7.1 billion (FY2024)
- Chancellor: Gary S. May
- Provost: Mary Croughan
- Faculty: 2,175 (fall 2023)
- Students: 40,848 (fall 2023)
- Undergraduates: 31,797 (fall 2023)
- Postgraduates: 7,912 (fall 2023)
- Location: Davis, California, United States; 38°32′24″N 121°45′0″W
- Campus: 7,331 acres (2,967 ha); Small suburb
- Other campuses: Sacramento; San Ramon
- Newspaper: The California Aggie
- Colors: Aggie blue and gold
- Nickname: Aggies
- Sporting affiliations: NCAA Division I FCS – Big Sky; Mountain West; WCC; Big 12
- Mascot: Gunrock the Mustang
- Website: ucdavis.edu
- ASN: 6192

The University of California, Davis (UC Davis, UCD, or Davis) is a public land-grant research university in the Davis, California area, United States. It is the northernmost of the ten campuses of the University of California system. The institution was first founded as an agricultural branch of the system in 1905 and became the sixth campus of the University of California in 1959.

Founded as a primarily agricultural campus, the university has expanded over the past century to include graduate and professional programs in medicine (which includes the UC Davis Medical Center), engineering, science, law, veterinary medicine, education, nursing, and business management, in addition to 90 research programs offered by UC Davis Graduate Studies. The UC Davis School of Veterinary Medicine is the largest veterinary school in the United States. UC Davis also offers certificates and courses, including online classes, for adults and non-traditional learners through its Division of Continuing and Professional Education.

It is classified among "R1: Doctoral Universities – Very high research activity" and is considered a "Public Ivy". The UC Davis Aggies athletic teams compete in NCAA Division I, primarily as members of the Mountain West Conference with additional sports in the Big Sky Conference (football only), the Mountain Pacific Sports Federation, and the West Coast Conference. Athletes from UC Davis have won a total of 10 Olympic medals.

== History ==
=== Agriculture and the land-grant university ===
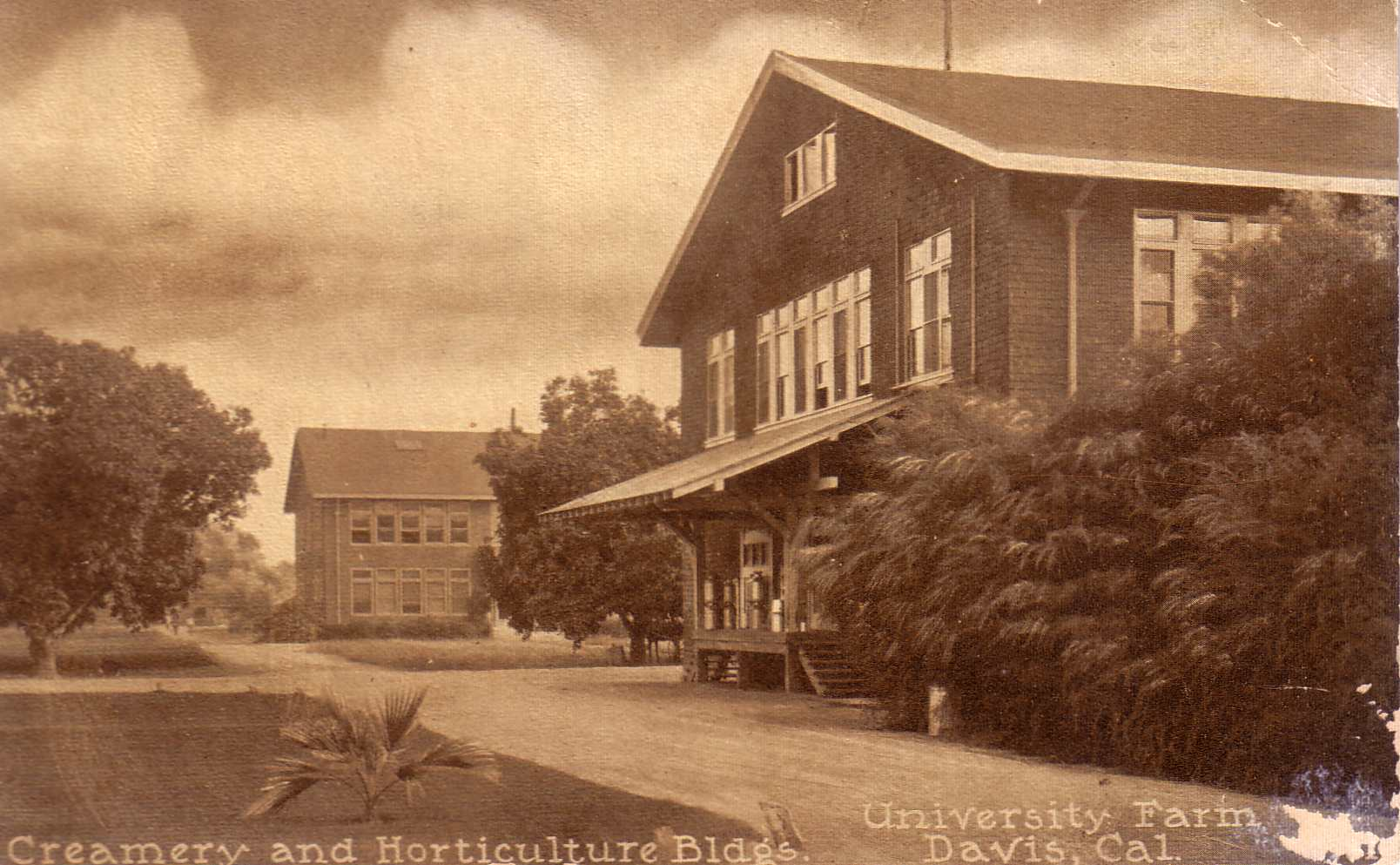
Early creamery and horticulture buildings, University Farm

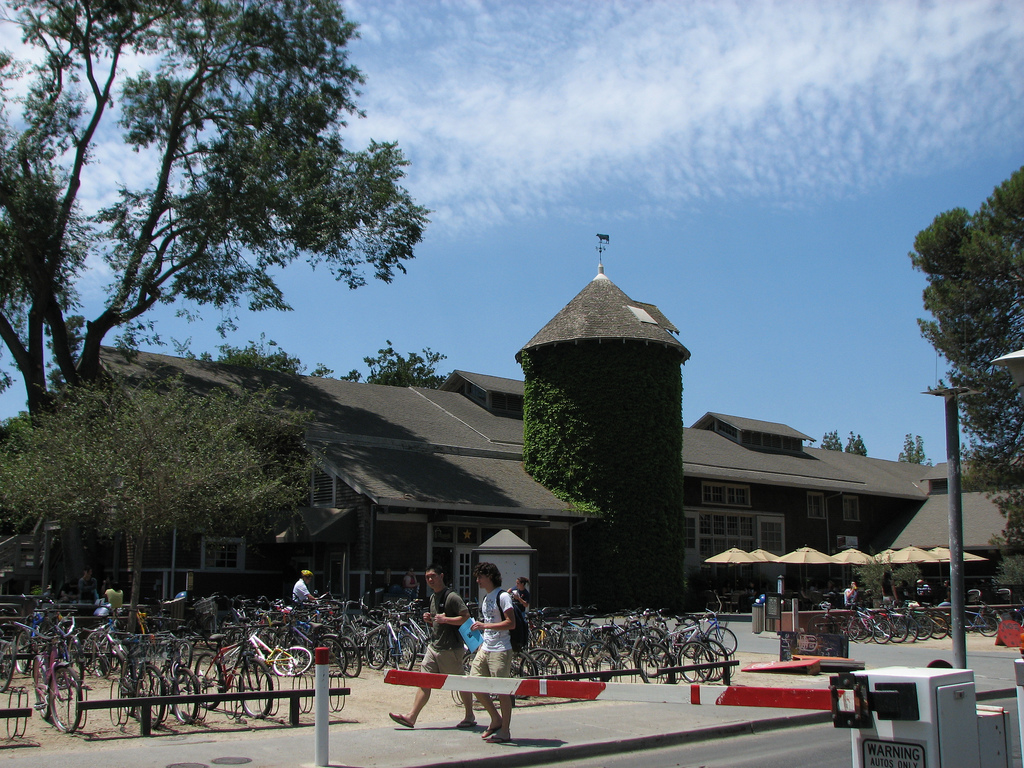
The Silo Union, one of the original buildings

In 1868, the University of California Davis was established as a land-grant university, and immediately founded a College of Agriculture as its first college as required by the Morrill Land-Grant Acts and the university's own Organic Act. UC operated a small farm at the Berkeley campus for several years after Ezra S. Carr became professor of agriculture, but he managed to alienate both the university faculty and the state's farmers with his attempt to directly integrate practical training in farming with courses on the larger historical, social, and political dimensions of farming and got himself fired in 1874. The faculty could not understand why students should earn credit towards degrees for hoeing or plowing, and the farmers could not understand how learning the social history of farming could make their children into better farmers.

Eugene W. Hilgard, Carr's successor, recognized that Berkeley's soil and climate were terrible for farming; as he himself explained, the campus site was situated "within the belt of extreme coast climate, accentuated by the direct impact of the cold summer fogs pouring through the Golden Gate". He switched from "practical" to what he called "rational" instruction in scientific principles of agriculture at Berkeley. He concentrated on things like soil science and fermentation that could be researched and taught in a university laboratory, supplemented by limited data gathering and experiments (but not hands-on teaching) at agricultural experimental stations in the field. Hilgard was originally disdainful of the idea of a university farm. He felt that for such a farm to teach effectively, it would necessarily have to be a model farm with examples of the best of everything, without any reference to local profitability, climate, or circumstances, and such a thing was clearly infeasible. However, in his last report as dean of the College of Agriculture before his 1905 retirement, Hilgard finally came around to the idea that a university farm "had become a pressing need" and was "much needed for proper and practical instruction in agriculture".

=== Founding of the university farm ===
Around the turn of the 20th century, Peter J. Shields, secretary of the California Agricultural Society, became aware that colleges of agriculture elsewhere had university farms which performed experiments and provided hands-on education in useful agricultural subjects, and that young people were leaving the state to study at such farms. Shields began to champion the cause of a university farm. He was later honored as the "founder" of UC Davis in 1962, when the Shields Oak Grove on campus was named after him, and again posthumously in 1972 when the campus library was named after him. However, local farmer and politician George Washington Pierce Jr. also fought aggressively in the California State Assembly for the creation of a university farm. Shields himself credited Pierce with ensuring that the site criteria in the University Farm Bill were so tightly formulated that they could be met only at the Yolo County town of Davisville. Unlike Shields, Pierce did not live long enough to see the promotion of Davis to a general campus and is now largely forgotten.

On March 18, 1905, the University Farm Bill was enacted, which called for the establishment of a farm for the University of California. The bill provided that the University Farm would "be typical and representative of the best general agricultural conditions in California", and authorized an appropriation of $150,000.00 to cover the cost of purchasing land and constructing appropriate buildings. A committee appointed by the Regents of the University of California took a year to select a site for the University Farm, a 779-acre portion of the stock farm of Jerome C. Davis, near a tiny town then known as Davisville. The regents officially took control of the property in September 1906 and constructed four buildings in 1907.

Short courses were first offered at the University Farm in October and November 1908. On January 5, 1909, the University Farm School officially opened for instruction. At its inception, the Farm School was an agricultural high school offering a three-year course for farm boys who were at least 15 years old. The original class in January 1909 consisted of 18 young men, as the original dormitories were not designed to accommodate girls. In 1913, the minimum age of entrance was raised from 15 to 18. As of 1913, the University Farm community was overwhelmingly male and rather immature. The first female students at Davis came from the College of Agriculture at Berkeley to visit the Farm for a few months in 1914. Women began to participate in the farmers' short courses in 1917 and then the Farm School admitted girls for the first time in 1918.

In May 1922, the Farm School was formally terminated after graduating its final class of 97 students and was replaced that fall with a non-degree vocational program offering a variety of one- and two-year courses. Students who completed the two-year vocational courses were awarded certificates.

=== From vocational certificates to bachelor's degrees ===
In 1916, the Farm's 314 students occupied the original 778 acres (315 ha) campus. The institution grew at a breakneck pace over the next four decades. By 1951, it had expanded to a size of 3,000 acres (1,200 ha). Along the way, it was renamed in 1922 to become the Northern Branch of the College of Agriculture, and in 1938, it became the College of Agriculture at Davis.

Initially, no degrees were awarded at Davis. From the very beginning in January 1909, students in the College of Agriculture at Berkeley enrolled at Davis for a single semester to obtain practical training on an actual farm alongside the Farm School students, but had to return to Berkeley to earn their degrees. Because the non-degree program at Davis was so disconnected from the traditional degree programs on the main Berkeley campus, agricultural interests began to agitate to separate Davis and the entire College of Agriculture from the University of California. This forced the regents in 1922 to silence such proposals by initially authorizing a two-year undergraduate program at Davis. By sharing faculty members between Berkeley and Davis and hiring a few more faculty members, the university was able to provide almost all courses of a "complete undergraduate program" at Davis—that is, a four-year program leading to the bachelor's degree. The first class graduated from Davis in 1926.

UC regularly appointed faculty members to joint positions at both Berkeley and Davis. This was possible because the two campuses are separated by only 53 miles (85 km), and the opening of a new bridge over the Carquinez Strait in 1927 greatly shortened the drive between them. Sharing faculty meant that the two campuses have always had an amicable relationship, in that Davis gradually developed its own strong identity while remaining proud of its older sibling. Thus, Davis did not suffer from the kind of "hang-ups" (i.e., inferiority complexes) which at Los Angeles culminated in a systemwide decentralization process from 1957 to 1960 in which the regents and the UC president delegated most of their powers and responsibilities to chancellors at the campus level. Davis still retains a few traditions from its early era when its identity was much more intertwined with Berkeley, such as the Bossy Cow-Cow cheer, a parody of Berkeley's Oski Yell.

In 1941, the state legislature authorized the creation of a school of veterinary medicine at Davis, but the school's launch was severely delayed by the entrance of the United States into World War II and it did not open until 1948. In 1943, the U.S. Army Signal Corps took over Davis to use the campus as a training facility. The Davis campus was not returned to civilian use until the end of 1944.

From 1926 to 1947, all Davis students earning bachelor's degrees had to travel to Berkeley for graduation. In 1948, "the regents agreed to decentralize graduations". In a ceremony at Davis that year, UC President Robert Gordon Sproul "awarded 101 bachelor of science degrees in agriculture", along with 195 certificates to graduates of the two-year vocational program.

In 1949, UC expanded the Davis campus to what is now West Campus by purchasing the 526-acre Straloch Farm to the west from its owner, Harry Hopkins. The farm came with an 86-acre private airport constructed by Hopkins in 1946. The University Airport is still the only one in the UC system.

Meanwhile, enrollment in the two-year vocational program was falling, as similar options were becoming more widely available elsewhere. In fall 1958, the campus administration announced that the two-year vocational program would be discontinued, and the last certificates were awarded in 1960.

=== Promotion to general campus ===
For much of its early history, Davis was treated as an offsite department of the main campus in Berkeley, and its chief administrative officer was a director who reported to the dean of the College of Agriculture at Berkeley. In 1944, the title became assistant dean and in 1951, the title was upgraded to provost. In May 1952, the university appointed Harry R. Wellman as its first vice-president—agricultural sciences in charge of a new Division of Agriculture, which included the existing statewide College of Agriculture at Berkeley, Davis, Los Angeles, and Riverside; the agricultural extension field stations; and the county farm offices. The provosts at Davis and Riverside reported to the president through this new vice-president (rather than through the College of Agriculture).

Stanley B. Freeborn served as Davis's first provost from 1952 to 1958 and then as its first chancellor from 1958 to 1959 (in anticipation of its promotion to a general campus). However, Freeborn retired in 1959 after only one year as chancellor, then died the next year.

In October 1959, Davis was formally designated by the regents as a general campus and its chancellor was vested with the same autonomy as the chancellors at UC Berkeley and UCLA—meaning that like them, Davis's chancellor would now report directly to the university's president. The Board of Regents declared that Davis's College of Agriculture "will continue to be the University's major center of teaching and research in agriculture, which will remain a dominant emphasis". The board also suggested that the Davis campus should give "special attention" to "opportunities" to be of service to the state government due to its proximity to the state capital at Sacramento. Finally, the board set an enrollment target of 6,000 students by 1970.

Most of Davis's initial development as a UC general campus was supervised by its second chancellor, Emil M. Mrak, who served from 1959 to 1969. Mrak fondly recalled his bicycle-riding days as a child among the orchards of the Santa Clara Valley, and during his chancellorship, he worked hard to make the Davis campus into a bicycle-friendly place. When Mrak retired in 1969, the campus administration building was named Mrak Hall in his honor.

Davis's Graduate Division was established in 1961. This was followed by the creation of the College of Engineering in 1962. The School of Law opened for classes in fall 1966, and the School of Medicine began instruction in fall 1968. In a period of increasing activism, a Native American studies program was started in 1969, one of the first at a major university; it was later developed into a full department within the university.

=== 2011 pepper spray incident and aftermath ===
During the Occupy movement against economic inequality, students at UC Davis organized the Occupy UC Davis protests in opposition to tuition hikes. On November 18, 2011, a campus police officer, Lieutenant John Pike, used pepper spray on a group of seated peaceful demonstrators when they refused to disperse, and another officer also pepper sprayed demonstrators at Pike's direction. The incident drew international attention and led to further demonstrations, a formal investigation, and Pike's departure in July 2012.

Documents released in 2016 through a public records request showed that the university had spent at least $175,000 to attempt to "scrub the Internet of negative postings" about the incident, in efforts that started in 2013. California newspaper The Sacramento Bee obtained a document outlining the public relations strategy, which stated: "Nevins and Associates is prepared to create and execute an online branding campaign designed to clean up the negative attention the University of California, Davis, and Chancellor Katehi have received related to the events that transpired in November 2011". The strategy included an "aggressive and comprehensive online campaign to eliminate the negative search results" intended to achieve the "eradication of references to the pepper spray incident in search results on Google for the university and the Chancellor". The university's strategic communications office, which has worked on the management of the reputation of the university and its chancellor, has had its budget substantially increased since the current chancellor took office – rising from $2.93 million in 2009 to $5.47 million in 2015. In August 2016 Katehi resigned as chancellor, and under the terms of her contract, will continue to be a full-time faculty member at UCD.

=== New chancellor ===
In February 2017, Gary S. May was named the seventh chancellor of UCD after a nationwide search. He officially began in the role on August 1. May, the former dean of the College of Engineering at Georgia Tech, is the second African American to be named chancellor at any of the UC campuses (after former UC Irvine chancellor, Ohio State president and former UC system president Michael Drake) and one of only three currently serving African American chancellors/presidents of an AAU institution.

=== 2022 UAW strike ===
In fall quarter of 2022, the United Auto Workers (UAW) led teaching assistants at UC Davis and other UC campuses in a strike that lasted several weeks. On December 16, 2022, the UCs reached a tentative agreement with the UAW.

=== 2023 UC Davis serial stabber ===
In 2023, three people were stabbed over the course of five days, two of whom died. On Thursday, May 4, 2023, Davis Police arrested a former UC Davis student, Carlos Reales Dominguez, as a suspect for the crimes.

== Campus ==
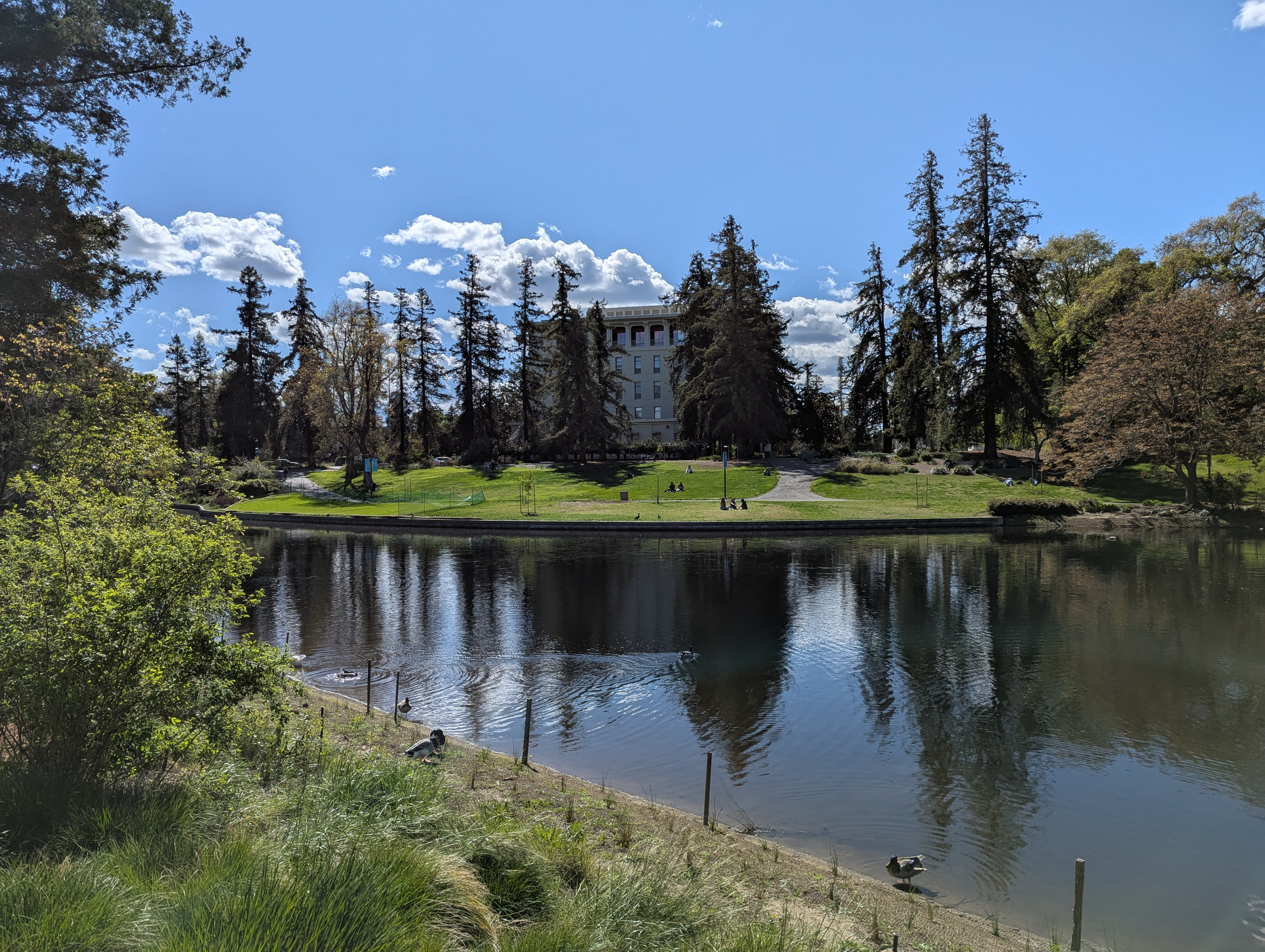
A view of Mrak Hall from the arboretum

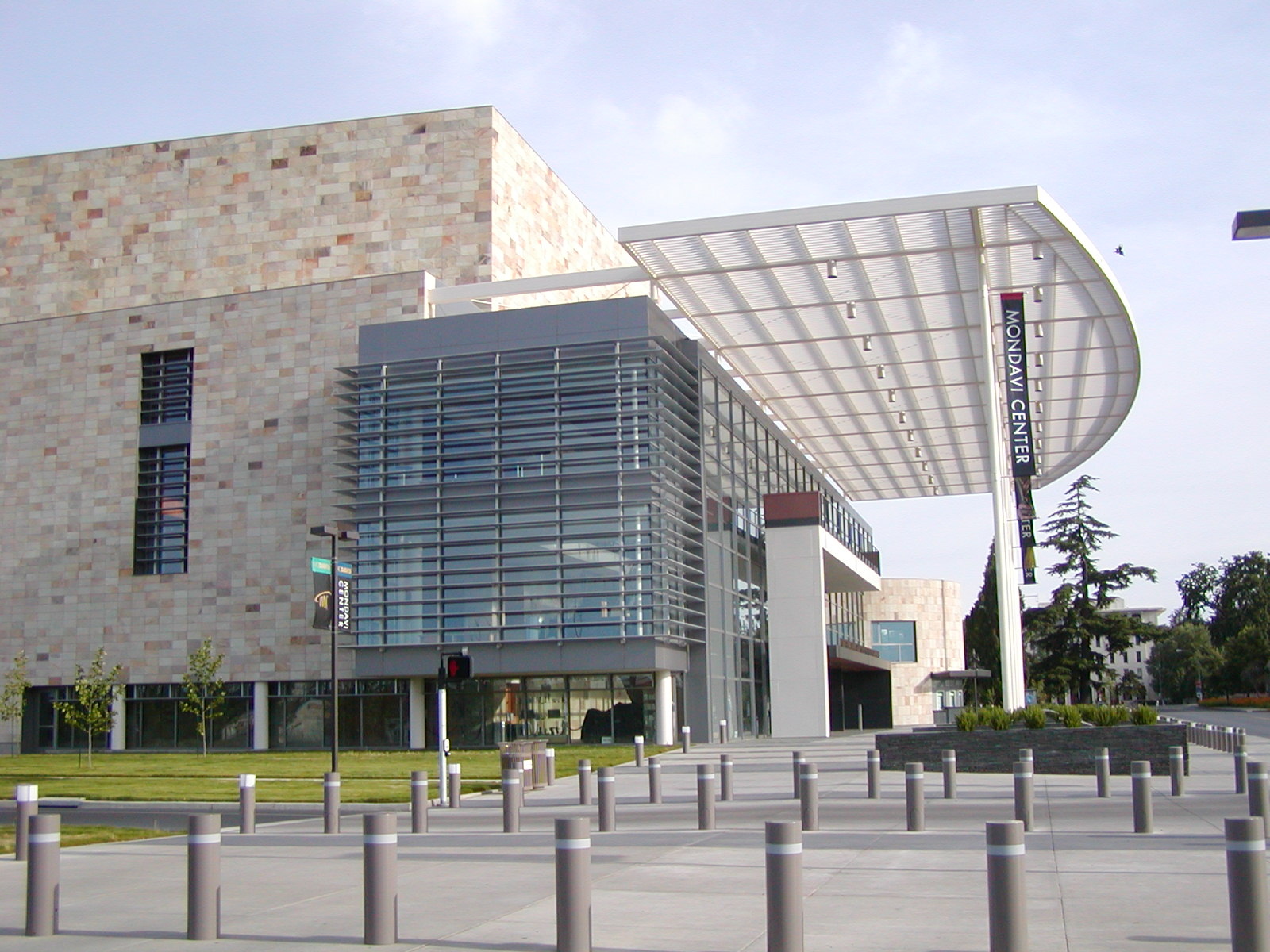
Mondavi Center

=== Size and location ===
Although named after the City of Davis, the majority of the campus is technically located adjacent to the City of Davis in an unincorporated part of Yolo and Solano counties. Some portions of university land extend into the Davis city limits.

The main campus is located 15 miles (24.1 km) west of Sacramento in the Sacramento Valley, part of California's Central Valley, and is adjacent to Interstate 80.

The city of Davis is a college town, with the ratio of students to long-term residents estimated at 1:4. Also contributing to the college-town environment is the close proximity of downtown Davis to the campus' main quad—a matter of a few blocks, and 5- to 10-minute walk or bike ride. Davis' 15-minute distance from Sacramento provides it with both the isolation critical to fostering a college-town environment while also providing a lively and large metropolitan area nearby. Although the campus itself is vast, the entire community of Davis is relatively small and is easily traversable on bike utilizing Davis' extensive bicycle trails. The campus is the largest Campus in the UC system.

=== Campus Core/Quad ===
Towards the northeast end of campus is the Quad, a large rectangular field, which was the historic geographic center of campus. The Quad remains the center of campus life, anchored to the north by the Memorial Union (student union), to the south by the Shields Library, and to the west and southeast by Wellman and Olson halls respectively.

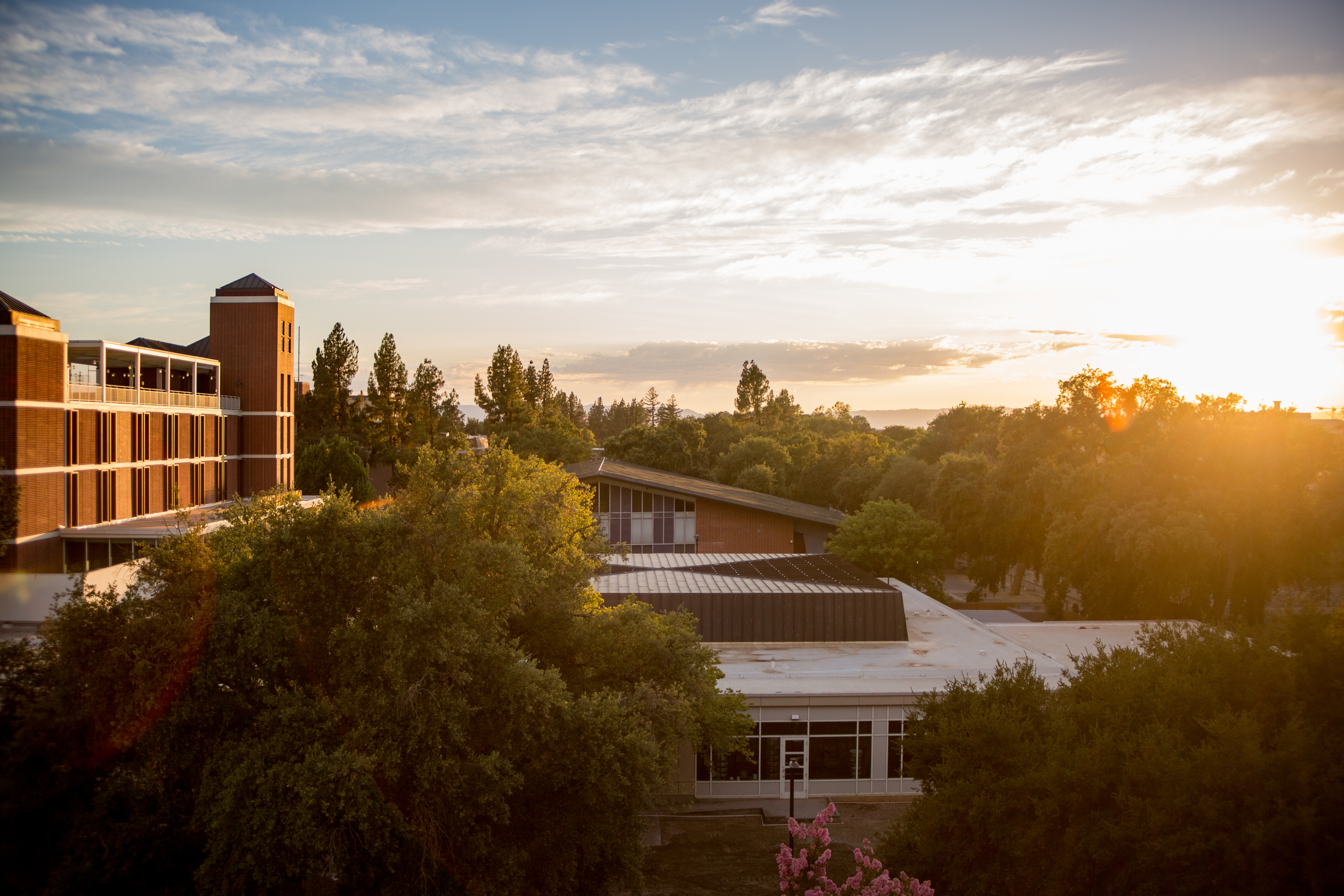
Memorial Union

The northeast side of campus holds more of the core buildings that were built earlier in UC Davis's history, such as Wellman Hall, Shields Library, Mrak Hall, and Hutchison Hall. Also notable in this northeastern corner is the labyrinthine Social Sciences and Humanities building designed by Antoine Predock, known to students as the "Death Star" for its angular, metallic design. The central campus is home to notable local cats, including Compost and Cheeto.

=== South Main Campus and South Campus ===
The majority of Equestrian Center, and Animal Sciences buildings are located near the Arboretum Waterway, away from the core campus; the West Entry Parking Complex, the Silo Union, and the newly constructed Science Lecture Hall and the Science Laboratory Building are located nearer to the Tercero residence halls and the core of campus. The Mondavi Center, home of the University Symphony Orchestra and other cultural events, is also located near the Tercero complex.

=== West Campus ===
For most of UC Davis' history, West Campus has served primarily as agricultural research land. Recently, portions were developed through a $300 million public-private partnership to form the largest zero net energy community in the United States, known as UC Davis West Village. West Village plans to provide housing for 3,000 students, faculty and staff.

The classes held in this area mainly involve plant sciences, but also include entomology courses as well. Students in the plant sciences maintain gardens as part of the PLS 5 lab while Entomology 156L and 158 students embark on field trips to sample fish for parasites at Putah Creek and conduct projects in forensic entomology at the UC Davis ecosystem, respectively. West Campus is also home to the University Airport, Foundation Plant Services, the California National Primate Research Center, and the Contained Research Facility, a bio-safety level 3 facility. Students can be seen operating tractors in the fields at the Western Center for Agricultural Equipment (WCAE) as a part of ABT 49, a popular elective in field equipment operations.

=== Arboretum ===
To the south side of the campus core is the 100-acre UC Davis Arboretum, which includes 3.5 miles of paved paths, 4,000 tree specimens, Putah Creek and Lake Spafford. On March 10, 2017, a multi-year waterway enhancement project began. The first phase of the project was completed in 2018 and a second phase was completed a year ahead of schedule in November 2024.

=== Artwork ===
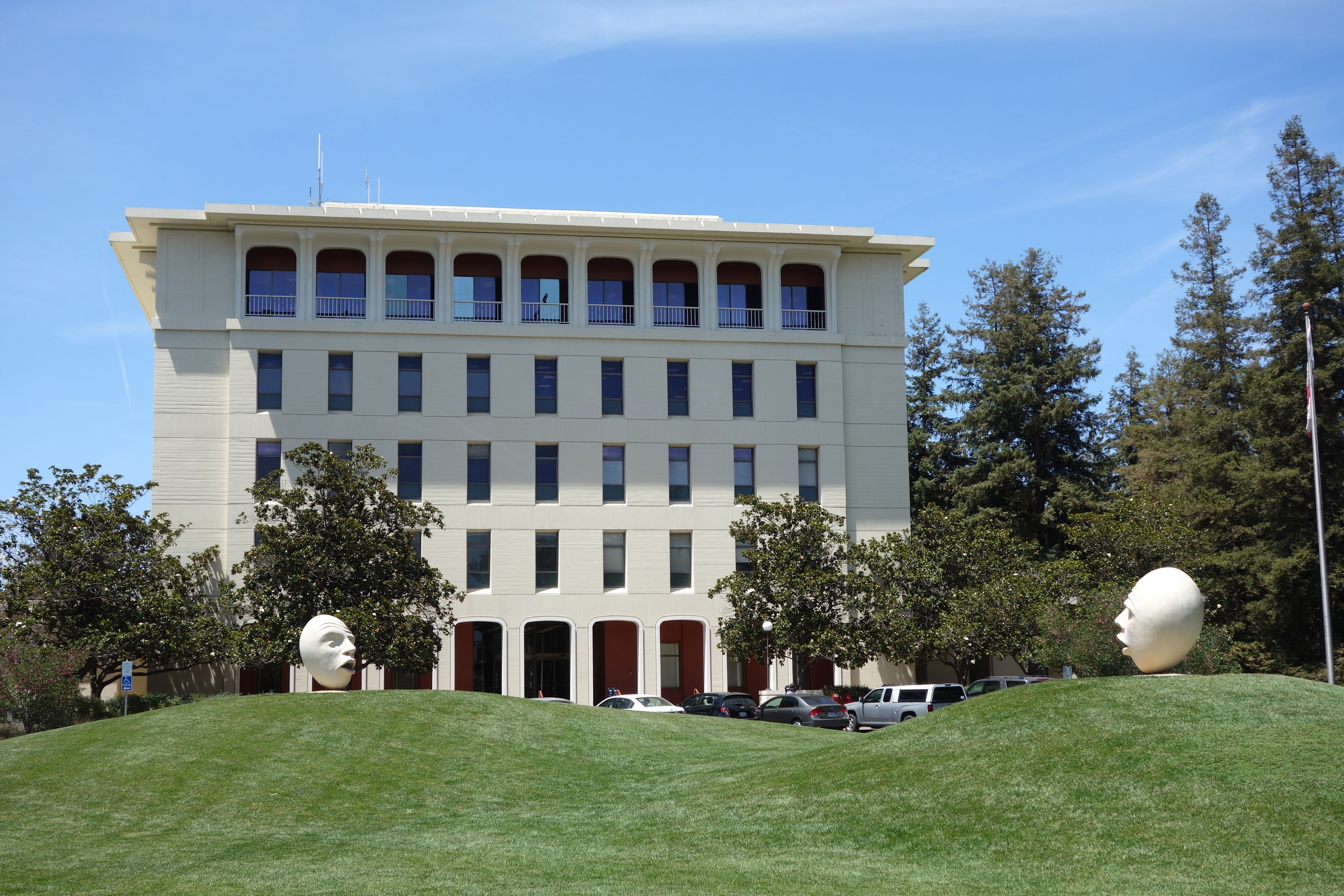
Two "Egghead" statues on the south lawn of Mrak Hall

There are seven public art statues found around campus, collectively called The Egghead Series, sculpted by the late Robert Arneson, who also taught at Davis from 1962 to 1991.

Bookhead is located at the Shields Library plaza, Yin & Yang is located at the Fine Arts Complex, See No Evil/Hear No Evil is at the east lawn of King Hall (the main building for UC Davis' School of Law), Eye on Mrak (FatalLaff) is outside Mrak Hall (housing the registrar office and other administrative offices), and Stargazer is located between North Hall and Young Hall. The Yin & Yang egg heads have been recast and duplicated for installation near the Port of San Francisco Ferry Building in San Francisco.

Museums on campus include the C.N. Gorman Museum, specializing in indigenous and Native American art; and the Manetti Shrem Museum of Art, with a focus on local artists from the Bay Area Figurative Movement, Pop art and Funk art movements.

=== Student housing ===
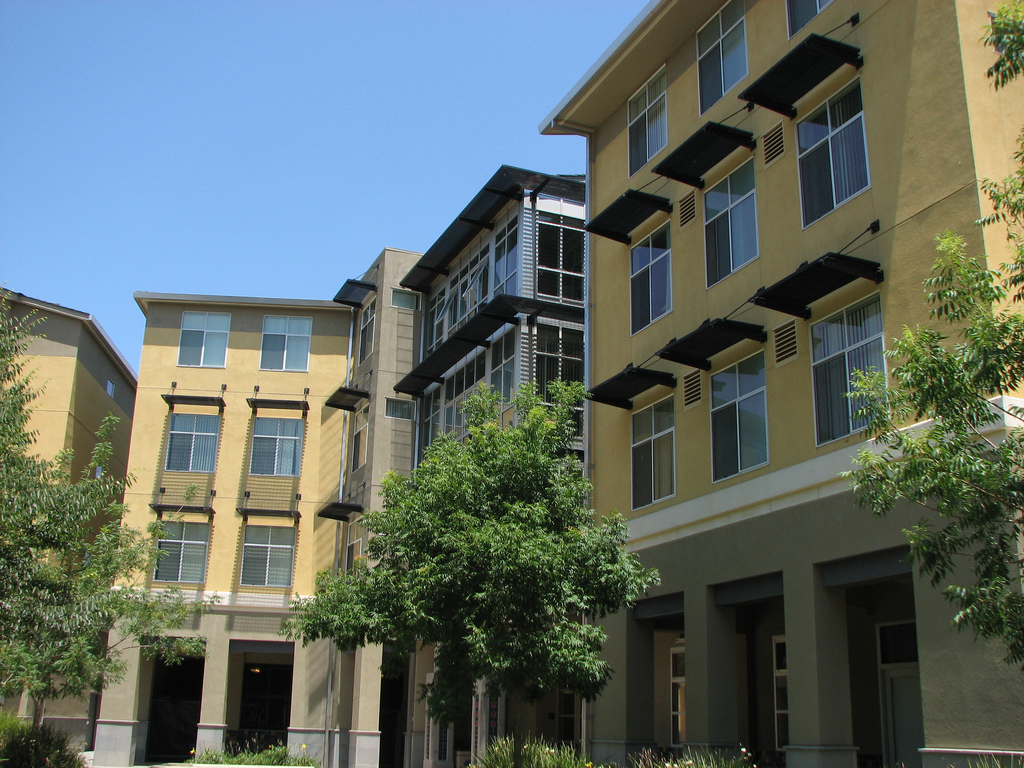
The Segundo dorms located north of the campus

UC Davis Student Housing operates 23 residence halls totaling 29 buildings which are organized into three areas: Segundo, Tercero, and Cuarto. UC Davis Student Housing operates and accommodates over 11,000 students.

In 2021, The Green at West Village neighborhood was opened and primarily accommodates transfer students from California's Community Colleges. Transfer students are guaranteed housing for two years (junior and senior years). Continuing students are given housing if availability permits (waitlist system). In the Fall of 2023, to replace the aging Solano Park Apartments, the Orchard Park neighborhood built near Cuarto opened. It is primarily designated as family student housing, giving priority to students with children or who are married. Students who do not have children or are not married, such as graduate or continuing students, are given housing if availability permits.

== Organization and administration ==
The entire University of California system is governed by the regents, a 26-member board, as established under Article IX, Section 9 of the California Constitution. The board appoints the university's principal officers including the system-wide president and UC Davis Chancellor.

The UC Davis Chancellor has overall responsibility for the leadership, management, and administration of the campus and reports to the President of the University of California system, a position currently held by the former chancellor of the University of Texas System, James Milliken (academic administrator), whose predecessor was former president of Ohio State University (and chancellor of UC Irvine), Michael Drake.

The Offices of the Chancellor and Provost is headed by the executive vice-chancellor and provost (EVCP). In their capacity as executive vice-chancellor, the EVCP shares with the chancellor in the overall leadership and management of campus administration and operations, whereas as provost, the EVCP is UC Davis' chief academic officer.

The senior staff provides executive support to the Offices of the Chancellor and Provost. The Council of Deans and Vice-Chancellor consists of the heads of the university's major academic and administrative units.

== Demographics ==
=== Student demographics ===
In 2014, Chancellor Katehi stated that UC Davis aimed to become a Hispanic-Serving Institution by the 2018–2019 school year, with at least 25% of the undergraduate student body consisting of Latinos. As of Fall 2023, women comprised 58.4% of undergraduate students.

In 2025, UC Davis was designated as a Black-Serving Institution, with over 1500 students who were Black or African American.

Undergraduate demographics as of Fall 2023
Race and ethnicity	Total
Asian	31%
Hispanic	25%
White	21%
Foreign national	13%
Two or more races	6%
Black	2%
Unknown	2%
Economic diversity
Low-income (Note: The percentage of students who received an income-based federal Pell grant intended for low-income students.)	32%
Affluent (Note: The percentage of students who are a part of the American middle class at the bare minimum.)	68%

=== Census data ===
University of California-Davis
- Census-designated place
- Location within California Location within the United States
- Coordinates: 38°32′15.73″N 121°45′28.44″W
- Country: United States
- State: California
- County: Yolo

Area
  - Total: 1.727 sq mi (4.47 km^{2})
  - Land: 1.727 sq mi (4.47 km^{2})
  - Water: 0 sq mi (0 km^{2})
- Elevation: 49 ft (15 m)

Population (2020)
  - Total: 8,525
  - Density: 4,936/sq mi (1,906/km^{2})
- Time zone: UTC-8 (Pacific)
  - Summer (DST): UTC-7 (PDT)
- GNIS feature ID: 2813413

University of California-Davis was first listed as a census-designated place by the United States Census Bureau in the 2010 U.S. census. The CDP is mostly contiguous with the campus but does include some adjacent private student housing that is not within the Davis city limits. Per the 2020 census, the population was 8,525.

The CDP is in the Davis Joint Unified School District.

Historical population
Census	Pop.	Note	%±
2010	5,786		—
2020	8,525		47.3%
U.S. Decennial Census; 1850–1870 1880–1890; 1900 1910 1920; 1930 1940 1950; 1960 1970 1980; 1990 2000 2010; 2020

==== 2020 census ====
University of California-Davis CDP, California – Racial and ethnic composition Note: the US Census treats Hispanic/Latino as an ethnic category. This table excludes Latinos from the racial categories and assigns them to a separate category. Hispanics/Latinos may be of any race.
Race / Ethnicity (NH = Non-Hispanic)	Pop 2010	Pop 2020	% 2010	% 2020
White alone (NH)	2,172	4,046	37.54%	47.46%
Black or African American alone (NH)	136	339	2.35%	3.98%
Native American or Alaska Native alone (NH)	12	102	0.21%	1.20%
Asian alone (NH)	2,424	2,079	41.89%	24.39%
Pacific Islander alone (NH)	7	155	0.12%	1.82%
Other race alone (NH)	17	31	0.29%	0.36%
Mixed race or Multi-racial (NH)	290	364	5.01%	4.27%
Hispanic or Latino (any race)	728	1,409	12.58%	16.53%
Total	5,786	8,525	100.00%	100.00%

== Academics ==
The university has 102 undergraduate majors and 101 graduate programs. It has a Department of Viticulture and Enology (concerning the scientific study of grape-growing and winemaking) that has been and continues to be responsible for significant advancements in winemaking utilized by many Californian wineries. The campus claims to be noted for its top-rated Agricultural and Resource Economics programs and the large Department of Animal Science through which students can study at the university's own on-campus dairy, meat-processing plant, equestrian facility, and experimental farm. Students of Environmental Horticulture and other botanical sciences have many acres of campus farmland and the University of California, Davis, Arboretum at their disposal. The Department of Applied Science was founded and formerly chaired by physicist Edward Teller. The arts are also studied extensively on campus with subjects such as studio art, design, music, theater and dance. The Design Department at UC Davis is the only comprehensive academic design unit of the University of California system. There is also the Mondavi Center for the Performing Arts which features artists from all over the globe.

UC Davis undergraduate majors are divided into four colleges (with their founding in parentheses):

- UC Davis College of Agricultural and Environmental Sciences (1922)
- UC Davis College of Biological Sciences (2005)
- UC Davis College of Engineering (1962)
- UC Davis College of Letters and Science (1951)

=== Rankings ===
Academic rankings

National
- Forbes: 43
- U.S. News & World Report: 32 (tie)
- Washington Monthly: 26
- WSJ/College Pulse: 12

Global
- ARWU: 101–150
- QS: 114 (tie)
- THE: 62 (tie)
- U.S. News & World Report: 96 (tie)

National Program Rankings
Program	Ranking
Biostatistics	24 (tie)
Business	57 (tie)
Chemistry	38 (tie)
Computer Science	36 (tie)
Earth Sciences	14 (tie)
Economics	26 (tie)
Education	42 (tie)
Engineering	36 (tie)
English	26 (tie)
Fine Arts	15 (tie)
History	24 (tie)
Law	55 (tie)
Mathematics	30 (tie)
Medicine: Primary Care	Tier 1
Medicine: Research	Tier 2
Nursing: Master's	24 (tie)
Physician Assistant	40 (tie)
Physics	38 (tie)
Political Science	25 (tie)
Psychology	12 (tie)
Public Health	29 (tie)
Sociology	31 (tie)
Statistics	13 (tie)
Veterinary Medicine	1

Global Program Rankings
Program	Ranking
Agricultural Sciences	13
Arts & Humanities	104 (tie)
Biology & Biochemistry	51
Biotechnology & Applied Microbiology	42
Cell Biology	97
Chemistry	187 (tie)
Civil Engineering	157
Clinical Medicine	143
Computer Science	157 (tie)
Ecology	36 (tie)
Economics & Business	131
Electrical & Electronic Engineering	217 (tie)
Endocrinology & Metabolism	181
Engineering	180 (tie)
Environmental Engineering	193
Environment/Ecology	22
Food Science & Technology	39
Geosciences	99 (tie)
Green & Sustainable Science & Technology	221
Immunology	110
Infectious Diseases	164
Marine & Freshwater Biology	67 (tie)
Materials Science	324 (tie)
Mathematics	174
Meteorology & Atmospheric Sciences	87 (tie)
Microbiology	33
Molecular Biology & Genetics	61 (tie)
Nanoscience & Nanotechnology	327
Neuroscience & Behavior	105 (tie)
Oncology	145 (tie)
Optics	178
Pharmacology & Toxicology	164
Physical Chemistry	408 (tie)
Physics	154
Plant & Animal Science	2
Psychiatry/Psychology	38
Public, Environmental & Occupational Health	154 (tie)
Radiology, Nuclear Medicine & Medical Imaging	103 (tie)
Social Sciences & Public Health	125 (tie)
Space Science	103 (tie)
Surgery	195 (tie)
Water Resources	51

Top 10 foreign countries in headcount (Fall 2025)
Country	Headcount
China	3,363
India	559
South Korea	182
Taiwan	162
Indonesia	85
Canada	79
Iran	66
Vietnam	56
Brazil	41
Japan	40

UC Davis is considered to be a "Public Ivy." In its 2023 edition, U.S. News & World Report ranked UC Davis tied for the 6th-best public university in the United States, tied for 28th nationally and tied for 73rd globally. Washington Monthly ranked UC Davis 13th in its 2020 National University ranking, based on its contribution to the public good as measured by social mobility, research, and promoting public service. Money magazine ranked UC Davis 10th in the country out of 739 schools evaluated for its 2020 "Best Colleges for Your Money" edition and 4th in its list of the 50 best public schools in the U.S. Forbes in 2022 ranked UC Davis 23rd overall out of 650 colleges and universities in the U.S., 22nd among research universities, 4th among public university, and 11th for "Best Value".

The university has several distinguished graduate programs ranked in the top 10 in their fields by the United States National Research Council; most notable are its programs in agricultural economics, entomology, evolutionary biology, plant biology, and ecology. Additionally, the NRC placed more than a third of UC Davis graduate programs in the top 25% of their respective fields. In 2016, U.S. News & World Report rated UC Davis 2nd globally in Agricultural Sciences, 1st in Plant and Animal Science, 4th in Environment/Ecology, and 1st nationally in Veterinary Medicine, 3rd in Ecology and Evolutionary Biology, 7th (tie) in Biological and Agricultural Engineering, 9th in U.S. Colonial History, 15th in Comparative Politics, 19th in Biological Sciences, 20th in Earth Sciences and 21st in Psychology. The Economics department of UC Davis was also ranked 6th among public universities and 20th nationally according to the RePec (Research Papers in Economics) Rankings in 2011. In 2013, The Economist placed UC Davis Graduate School of Management in the top 8% accredited MBA programs in the United States (ranked 37th nationally and 65th globally).

The Academic Ranking of World Universities placed UC Davis 40th nationally and 90th globally for 2019. In its 2019 rankings, Times Higher Education World University Rankings ranked it tied for 59th in the world. The QS World University Rankings ranked it tied for 104th globally for its 2020 ratings, with Veterinary Science ranked 2nd in the world.

In 2016, Sierra Magazine ranked UC Davis 8th in its "Greenest Schools" in America list for campus sustainability and climate change efforts.

=== Admissions ===
Undergraduate admission statistics
	Fall 2025	Fall 2024	Fall 2023	Fall 2022	Fall 2021
First-time Freshmen
Applicants	102,988	98,864	94,638	94,748	87,136
Admits	45,673	41,353	39,400	35,377	42,474
Admit rate	44%	42%	42%	37%	49%
Enrolled	6,805	6,767	6,578	6,399	7,482
Yield rate	15%	16%	17%	18%	18%
Transfers
Applicants	17,168	16,478	14,755	15,533	18,765
Admits	9,683	9,606	9,489	9,045	9,454
Admit rate	56%	59%	64%	58%	50%
Enrolled	2,613	2,597	2,558	2,614	2,817
Yield rate	27%	27%	27%	29%	30%

Admission to UC Davis is rated as "more selective" by U.S. News & World Report.

For Fall 2019, UC Davis received 78,093 freshmen applications; 30,358 were admitted (39.1%) and 5,957 enrolled. The average high school grade point average (GPA) of the enrolled freshmen was 4.13; the average SAT scores were between 610 and 710 for reading and 630–790 for math, and 28–34 for the ACT Composite score.

For 2021 incoming freshman class, UC Davis received a record of 105,850 applicants, an 11% increase from last year. The admission rate for incoming freshman for the class of 2021 was 37.5%.

=== Library ===
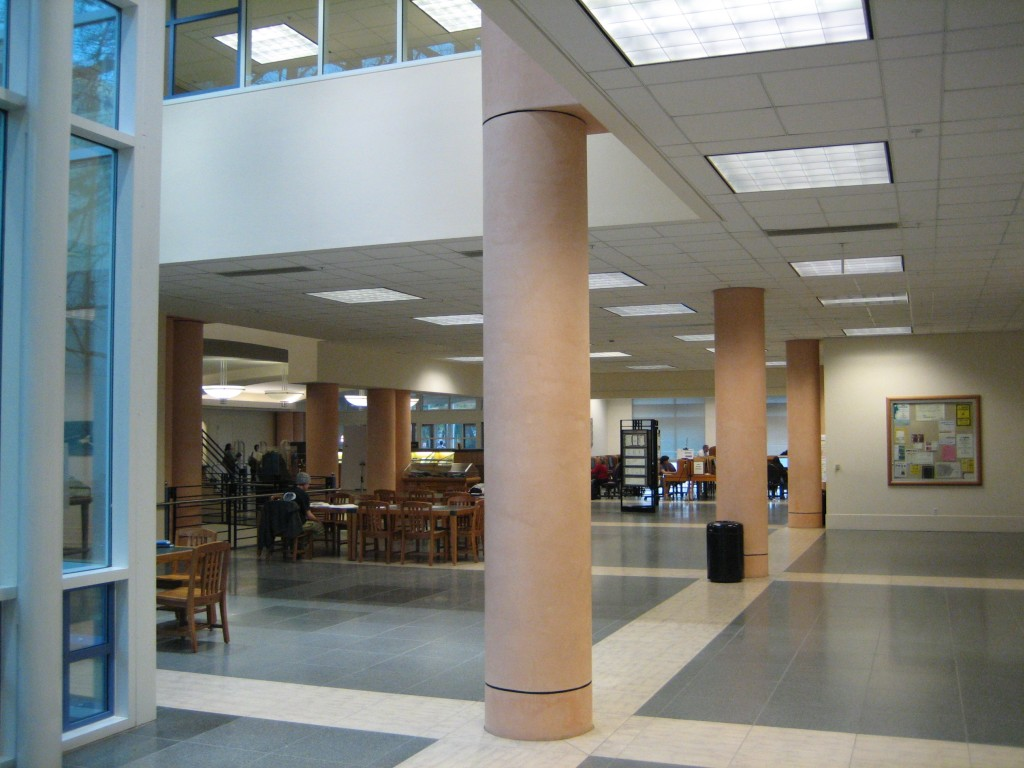
Inside of the Peter J. Shields Library

UC Davis' libraries include the Peter J. Shields Library, the Physical Sciences & Engineering Library, the Carlson Health Sciences Library, and the Medical Center Library in Sacramento, which collectively contain more than 3 million volumes and offer a number of special collections and services. The Peter J. Shields Library has three different architectural styles due to various construction and extensions being added; it is the main library where students study on-campus, with a 24-hour reading room, open computer labs, and unique furniture.

=== Army ROTC ===
The university is host to an Army Reserve Officer Training Corps (ROTC) program, the Forged Gold Battalion, with more than 50 cadets. With more than 60 years in existence, it currently commissions roughly 10 graduating seniors as second lieutenants every year.

== Graduate studies ==
The University of California Davis Graduate Programs of Study consist of over 90 post-graduate programs, offering masters and doctoral degrees and post-doctoral courses. The programs educate over 4,000 students from around the world.

UC Davis has the following graduate and professional schools, offering the broadest range of professional programs of all campuses in the UC system (with their founding in parentheses):

- UC Davis Graduate Studies (1925)
- Graduate School of Management (1981)
- School of Education (2002)
- School of Law (1965)
- School of Medicine (1966)
- School of Veterinary Medicine (1948)
- Betty Irene Moore School of Nursing (2009)

Across the UC system, Los Angeles and Riverside are the next closest to Davis in terms of the breadth of their professional programs, but both campuses are missing a veterinary school, while Riverside is also missing a nursing school.

=== History ===
The University of California, Davis graduate division has a long history. Graduate education has been a major feature of the academic focus for over 80 years. This academic tradition began in the fall of 1925, when 12 students received graduate degrees from the College of Agriculture through a partnership with the graduate division of the University California at Berkeley. Over the years, the programs continued to grow, interact and collaborate. The first graduate degrees were awarded from the UC Davis campus in the fall of 1949.

In 1961, autonomous graduate divisions and graduate councils were established on all University of California campuses to provide focused oversight of their graduate programs.

=== Academics ===
A key feature of graduate education at UC Davis is the graduate group. The core elements of a graduate group include an emphasis on "shared research interests among faculty and students; flexibility to grow and quickly change to reflect emerging areas of interdisciplinary knowledge and technology; and an acceptance that many research questions transcend traditional academic departmental boundaries." UC Davis offers more graduate groups than any other campus in the UC system.

=== Medical school admissions ===
In 2016, U.S. News & World Report named UC Davis School of Medicine as the 6th most competitive medical school in the United States with an acceptance rate of 2.8%.

== Faculty and research ==
UC Davis is one of 62 members in the Association of American Universities, an organization of leading research universities devoted to maintaining a strong system of academic research and education. It consists of sixty universities in the United States (both public and private) and two universities in Canada.

Between 2017 and 2020, UC Davis was paid $1.4 million by Neuralink to use its facilities for experiments with brain implants in monkeys. Some monkeys were euthanized after developing infections. The Physicians Committee for Responsible Medicine has filed a public records lawsuit demanding access to the research. The university claims that it complied with the California Public Records act, and that research protocols were thoroughly reviewed and approved by the campus's Institutional Animal Care and Use Committee (IACUC).

=== Research expenditures ===
UC Davis spent $788.8 million on research and development in fiscal year 2018, ranking it 30th in the nation.

For fiscal year 2024-25, UC Davis received $961 million in external research awards and funding.

=== Faculty honors ===
Its faculty includes 23 members of the National Academy of Sciences, 14 members of the National Academy of Engineering, 30 members of the American Academy of Arts and Sciences, 17 members of the American Law Institute, 5 members of the Royal Society, 3 Pulitzer Prize winners, 1 Guggenheim Fellow, and 3 MacArthur Fellows.

=== Research centers and laboratories ===
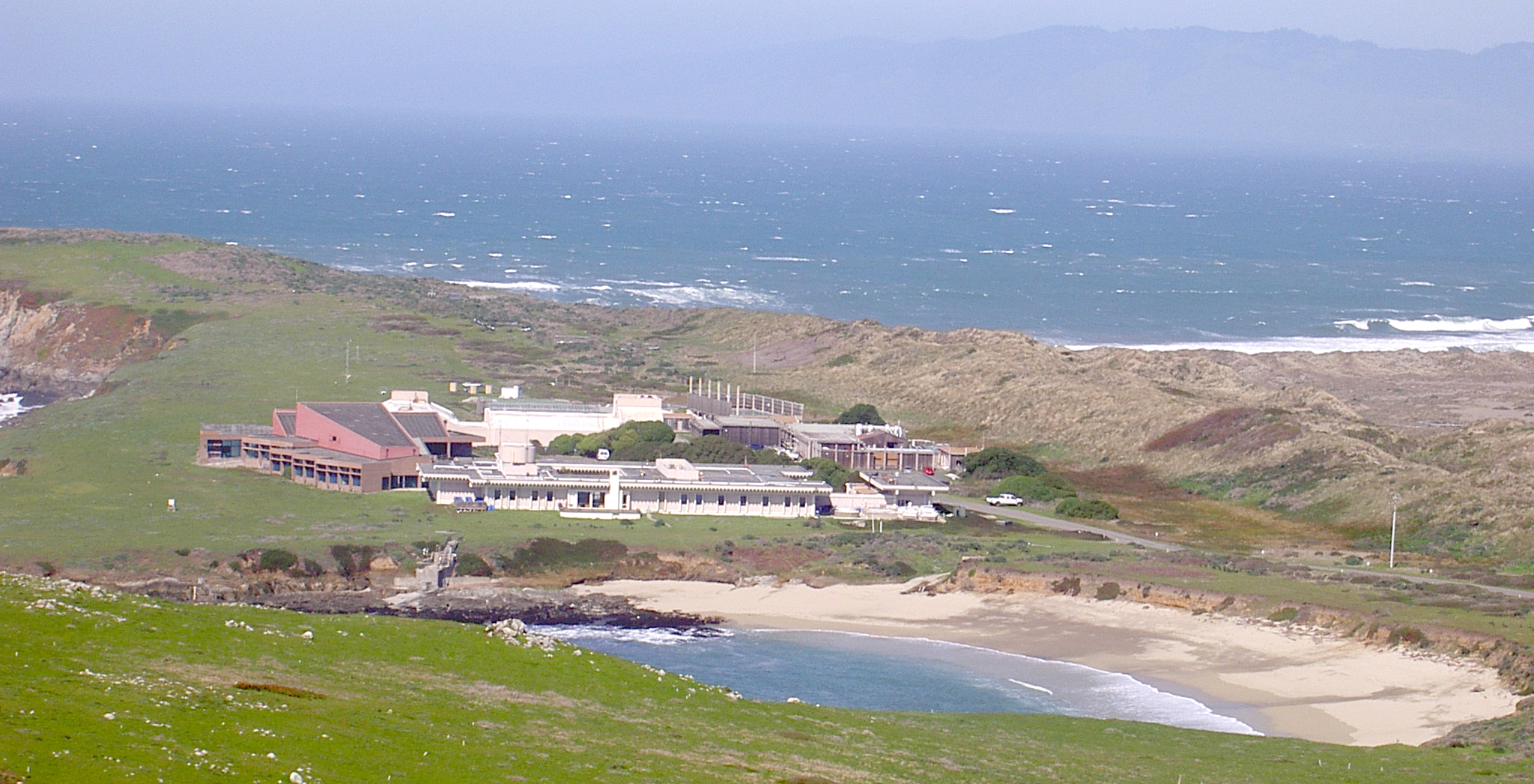
Bodega Marine Lab from the south, looking across Horseshoe Cove

The campus supports a number of research centers and laboratories, including:

- Advanced Highway Maintenance Construction Technology Research Laboratory
- BGI at UC Davis Joint Genome Center (in planning process)
- Bodega Marine Reserve
- C-STEM Center
- CalEPR Center
- California Animal Health and Food Safety Laboratory System
- California International Law Center
- California National Primate Research Center
- California Raptor Center
- Center for Health and the Environment
- Center for Mind and Brain
- Center for Poverty Research
- Center for Regional Change
- Center for the Study of Human Rights in the Americas
- Center for Visual Sciences
- Contained Research Facility
- Crocker Nuclear Laboratory
- Davis Millimeter Wave Research Center (a joint effort of Agilent Technologies Inc. and UC Davis; in planning process)
- Information Center for the Environment
- Institute of Transportation Studies
- John Muir Institute of the Environment (the largest research unit at UC Davis, spanning all colleges and professional schools)
- McLaughlin Natural Reserve
- MIND Institute
- Electric Vehicle Research Center (formerly Plug-in Hybrid Electric Vehicle Research Center, est. 2007)
- Quail Ridge Reserve
- Stebbins Cold Canyon Reserve
- Tahoe Environmental Research Center (TERC) (a collaborative effort with Sierra Nevada University)
- UC Center Sacramento
- UC Davis Nuclear Magnetic Resonance Facility
- University of California Pavement Research Center
- University of California Solar Energy Center (UC Solar)
- Energy Efficiency Center (the first university run energy efficiency center in the Nation).
- Western Institute for Food Safety and Security

The Crocker Nuclear Laboratory on campus has had a nuclear accelerator since 1966. The laboratory is used by scientists and engineers from private industry, universities and government to research topics including nuclear physics, applied solid state physics, radiation effects, air quality, planetary geology and cosmogenics. UC Davis is the only UC campus, besides Berkeley, that has a nuclear laboratory.

Agilent Technologies has partnered with the university to establish a Davis Millimeter Wave Research Center for research into millimeter wave and THz systems. Similarly, in 2020, the College of Engineering's Exploratory Systems Lab (ExpoLab) collaborated with Radix to formally model and verify the theoretical limitations of sharded consensus protocols.

== Student life ==
The undergraduate student government of UC Davis is the Associated Students of UC Davis (ASUCD), and has an annual operating budget of $22.2 million, making it one of the largest-funded student governments in the United States. ASUCD includes an Executive, Legislative, and Judicial branch. Other than representing the student body on campus, the task of ASUCD is to lobby student interests to local and state government. Also under the purview of ASUCD are the student-run Coffee House, an ASUCD unit, and Unitrans, the Davis public bus system. ASUCD employs thousands of students annually across its many units.

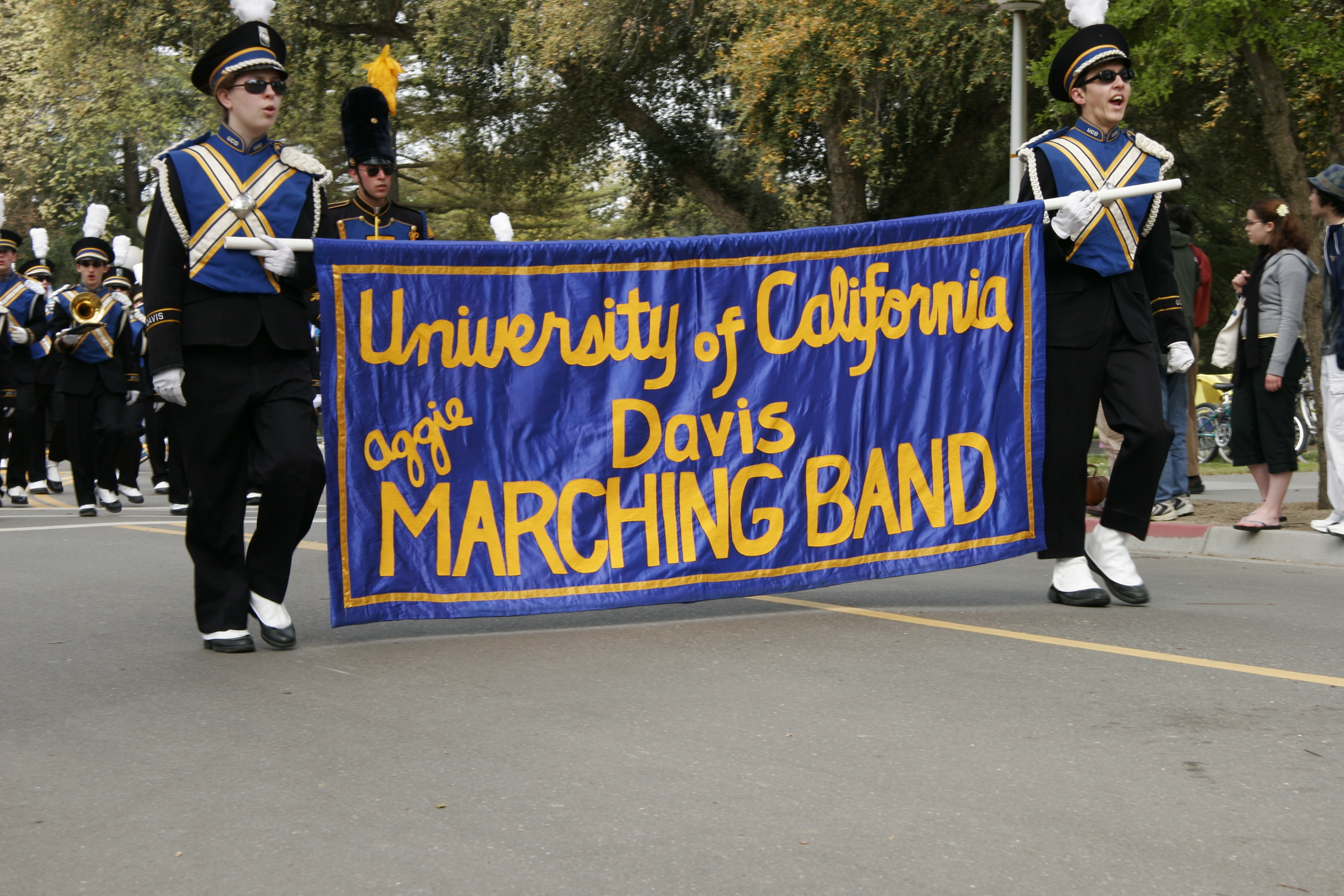
UC Davis California Aggie Marching Band-uh!

Picnic Day, UC Davis's annual Open House, is the largest student-run event in the United States. It attracts thousands of visitors each year with its many attractions. These include a parade, a dance competition by the university club dance groups called "Dance Dance Revolution", a magic show performed by the chemistry department, the Doxie Derby (dachshund races), film screenings, and a Battle of the Bands between the UC Davis Marching Band and other college bands including the Cal Band, the Stanford Band, and the Humboldt State University Marching Lumberjacks.

Another highlight of UC Davis is its student-run freeform radio station, KDVS. The station began operations on February 1, 1964, from the laundry room of the all-male dormitory Beckett Hall. The station soon gained a reputation by airing interviews with Angela Davis and a live call-in show with then California Governor Ronald Reagan in 1969. The station can now be heard on 90.3 FM and online at its website.

UC Davis has over 800 registered student organizations, ranging from political clubs to professional societies to language clubs.

The academic Graduate Students and management students are represented by the Graduate Student Association (GSA). The Law Students are represented by Law Students Association.

Students also participate in intramural sports such as basketball, ultimate frisbee, soccer and many more. The ARC contains a basketball gym, work out room, ping pong tables, squash courts, rock climbing wall, and other studio rooms for group exercise.

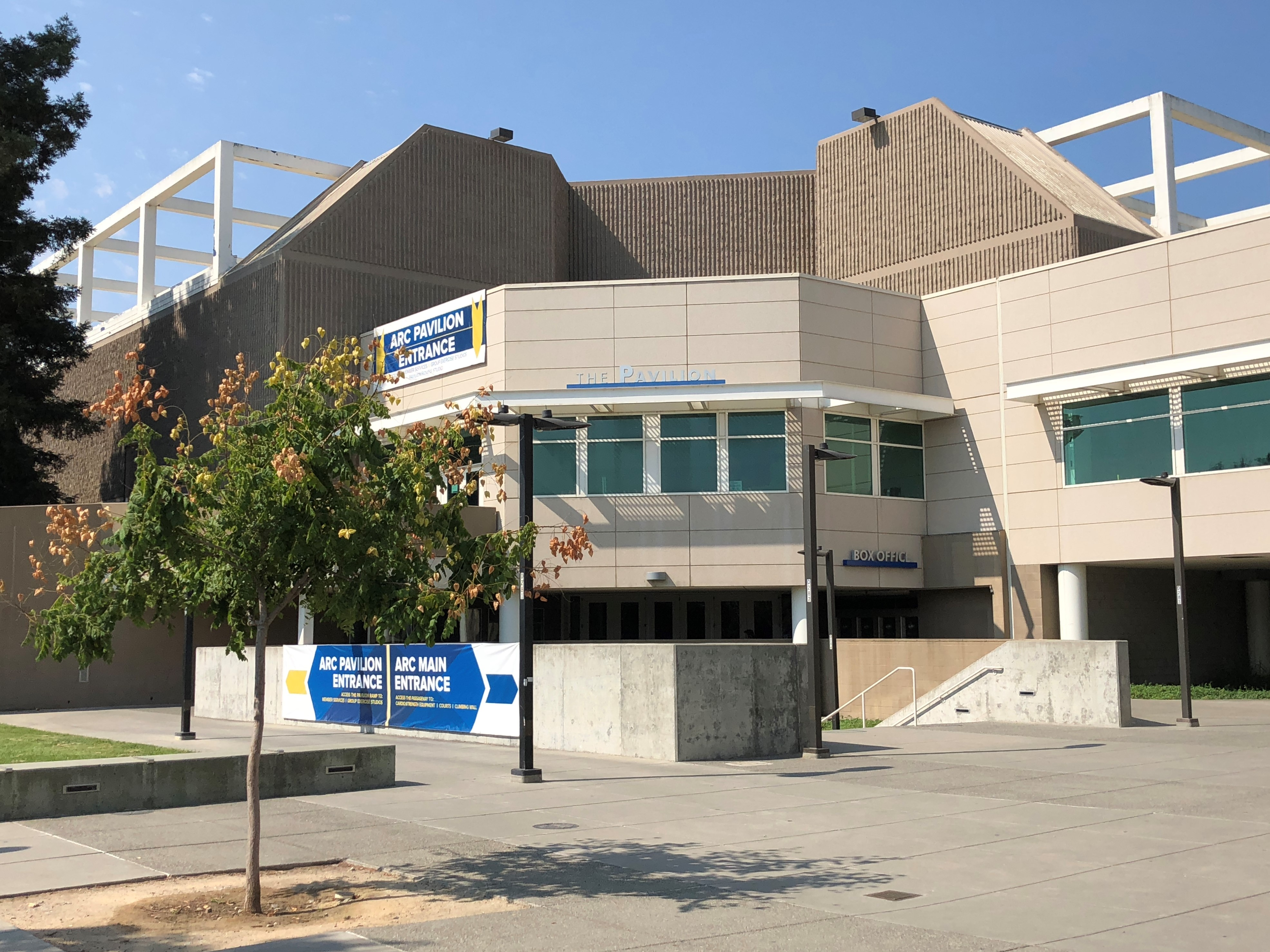

Other student activities and campus jobs:

- Unitrans, the student run (and driven) bus system.
- The Coffee House, also known as the CoHo, is a student run restaurant serving 7000 customers daily.
- The Bike Barn, a bicycle shop that sells and rents bicycles and cycling equipment, also a full-service repair shop.
- KDVS, student radio.
- The Entertainment Council, responsible for bringing famous musicians to campus and organizing student events.

=== Transportation ===
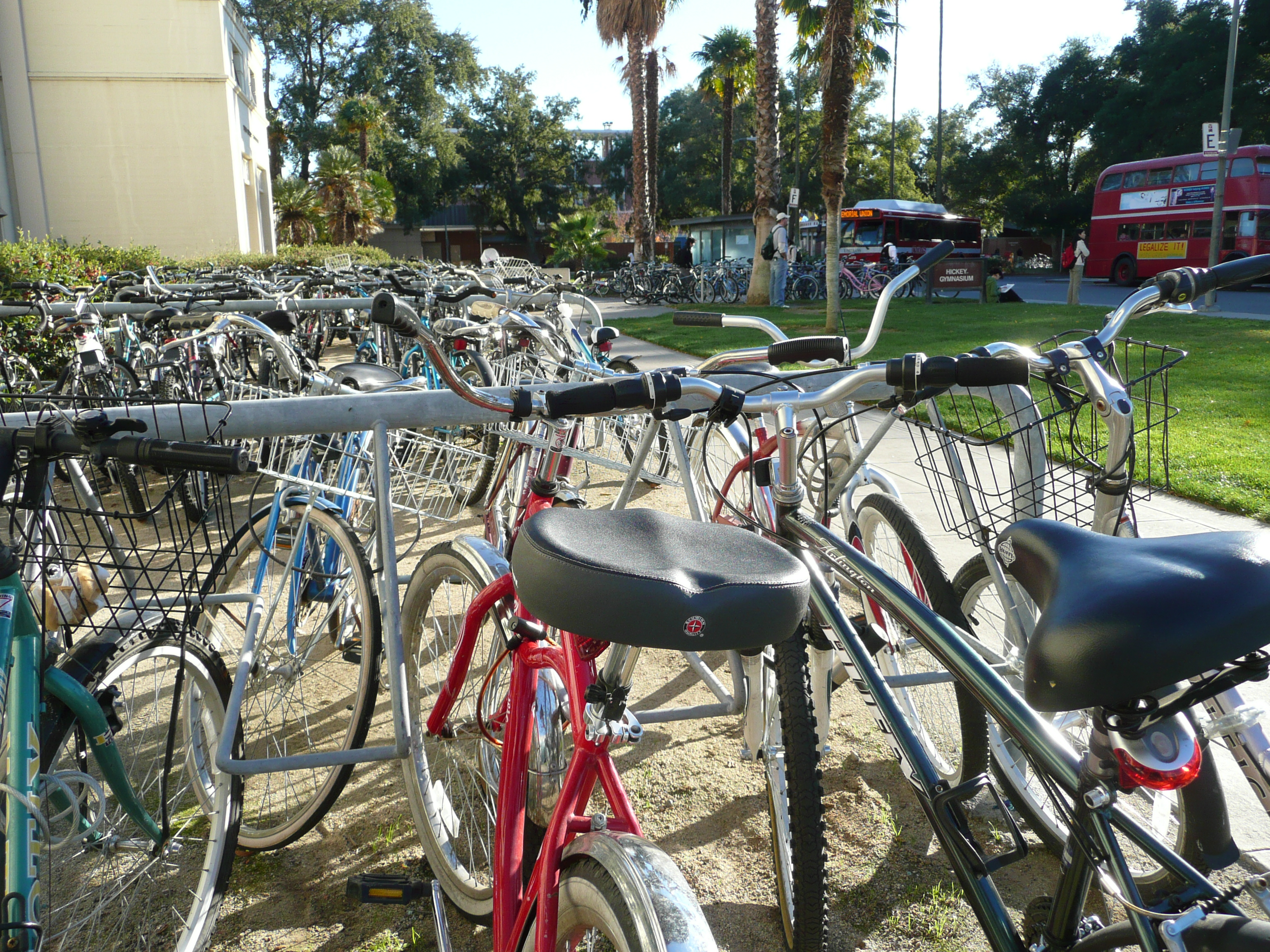
Many students use bicycles to get around the 7000-acre campus.

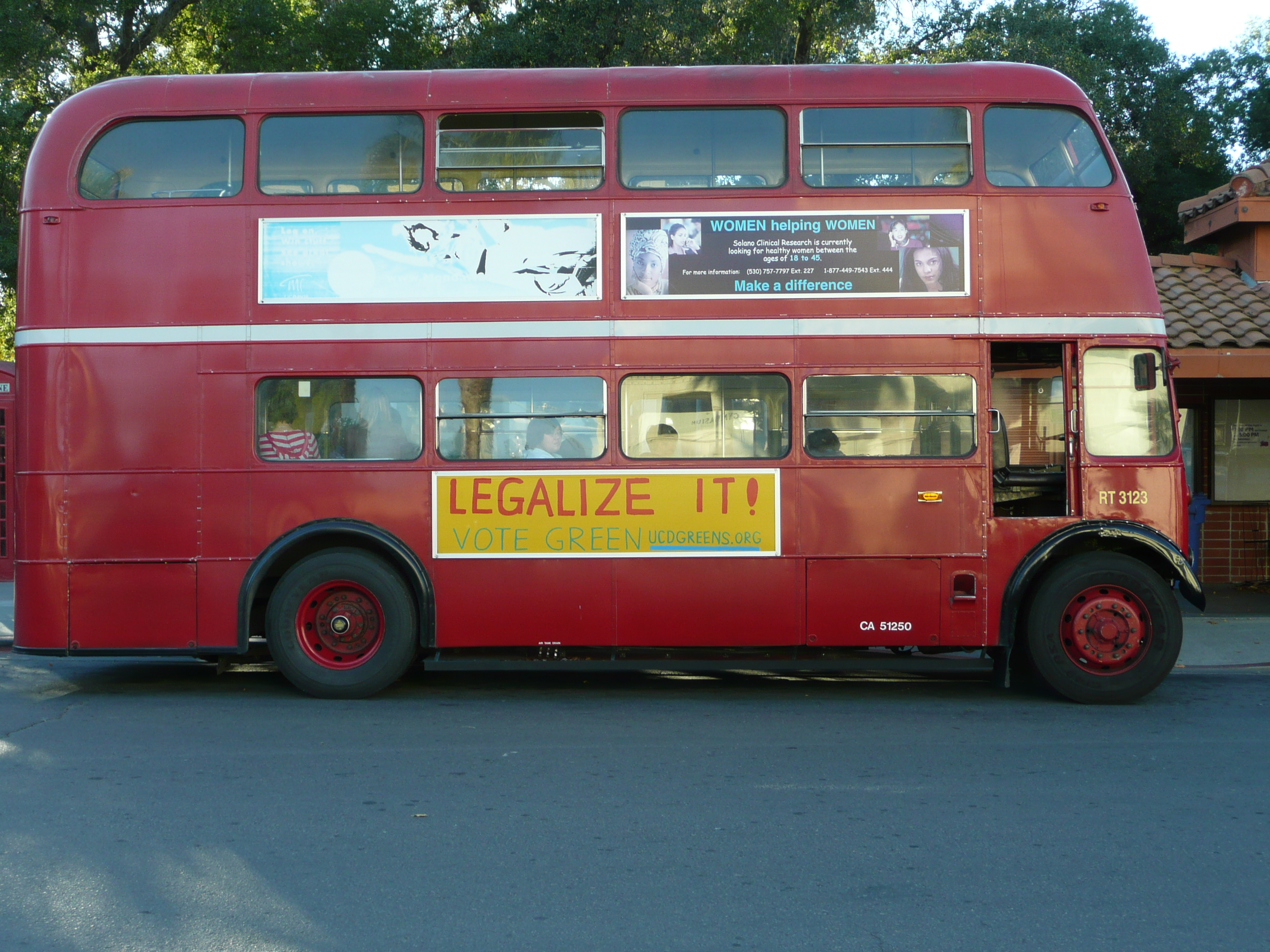
One of the double deckers in the city's student-run (and student-driven) bus system

Bicyclists are ubiquitous on campus and in the city. Both the university and municipality encourages this with bicycle-only infrastructure such as bike circles, large bike lanes, and traffic signals specifically for bikes. UC Davis has a road and mountain bike team which has won several national championship titles. The campus police department also has some of its officers patrol on bicycles and take bicycling under the influence ("BUI") and bicycling without a headlight at night very seriously. Students usually have their bicycles serviced on-campus at the ASUCD Bike Barn or at other bike shops around town. Students who do not own bicycles can rent an electric bicycle or scooter from Spin, which can be found around campus near bike racks.

UC Davis is also well known for its bus service, Unitrans, and its trademark London double decker buses. It has been in operation since 1968 and is believed to be the only general purpose (non-sightseeing) transit system in the U.S. to operate vintage double deck buses in daily service. The system is operated and managed entirely by students and offers fixed-route transportation throughout the city. Davis is also one of the busiest stations of the Capitol Corridor intercity railroad service operated by Amtrak between the Bay Area and Sacramento.

The central campus is bounded by freeways on two sides (Highway 113 and Interstate 80). All other UC campuses are either somewhat distant from the closest freeway or are directly adjacent to only one freeway. Two freeway exits are entirely within UCD's boundaries. One, off Highway 113, is signed "UC Davis / Hutchison Drive" and the other, off Interstate 80, is signed exclusively as "UC Davis." Despite the university's extensive bicycle infrastructure and public transportation service, easy freeway access coupled with increasing housing costs in the city of Davis has led to increased numbers of students commuting via automobile. Some students choose to live in the neighboring communities of Sacramento, Dixon or Woodland, and use their own cars or the county-wide Yolobus to get to UC Davis. In addition, a private charter bus that connected the Davis and Sacramento campuses was replaced in 2020 by the Causeway Connection bus service, in partnership with Yolobus and Sacramento Regional Transit. Other students also commute by motorcycle, but are also subject to similar parking rates as their four-wheeled counterparts.

There was a shuttle that ferried students between UC Davis and UC Berkeley that ran for decades. The service was discontinued in September 2025 due to rising costs and low ridership.

=== The California Aggie ===
UC Davis publishes a weekly student newspaper, The California Aggie. The Aggie was first published in 1915 as the Weekly Agricola after its approval by the Associated Student Executive Committee. At this point, UC Davis was considered the University Farm, an extension of UC Berkeley.

Initially, the Weekly Agricola was focused on both student news and farming-related topics. Novelist Jack London was one of the first readers of the Weekly Agricola. In 1922, it was renamed to match the school's athletic name. Between March 2014 and October 2016, the Aggie was not in print but was still accessible online. The Aggie is in print and available on campus again as of October 2016.

=== Greek life ===
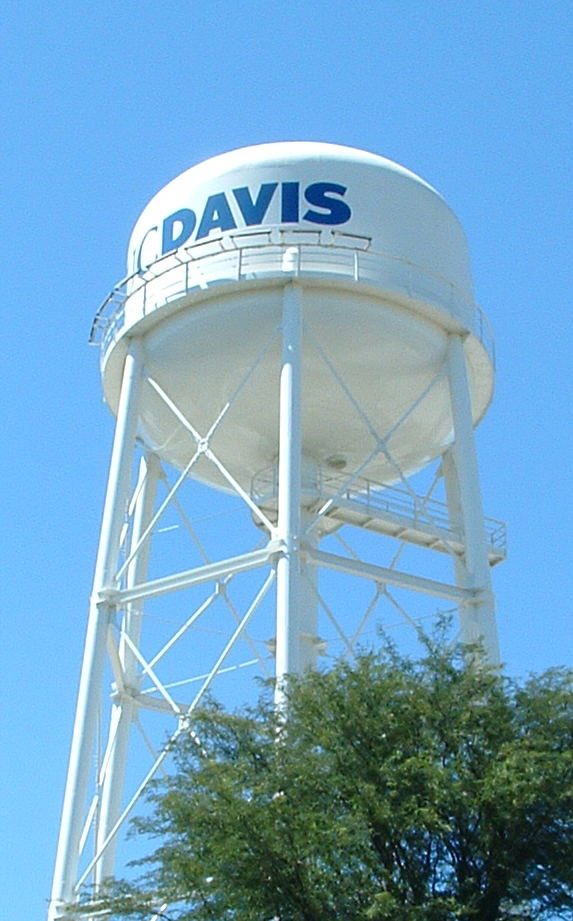
UC Davis' iconic water tower

Social fraternities and sororities have been a part of the University of California at Davis since 1913. Approximately 8% of the university's undergraduate students are involved in the school's fraternities and sororities. One sorority, Sigma Alpha Epsilon Pi, was featured during the first season of the MTV reality show Sorority Life.

There are currently 13 social fraternities that are a part of the Interfraternity Council (IFC) in Davis. There are currently 11 sororities that are a part of the Panhellenic Council.

The Phi chapter of Alpha Gamma Rho was locally established May 1, 1923, at UC Davis, making it the first continuously running national fraternity on campus. They started as the Kappa Tau fraternity, which was the first agricultural fraternity on campus. Many campus buildings are named after alumni of Alpha Gamma Rho such as Emil Mrak (Mrak Hall, Registrar's office), Orville Thompson (Thompson Hall, Segundo student housing), and Dean De Carli (the De Carli room, 2nd floor MU), Mel Olson Scoreboard (Aggie Stadium), and many more. The AGR Hall is an event space located inside the Buehler Alumni / Visitor Center and is commonly rented out as a conference room or banquet hall. There are both national and local fraternities and sororities at UCD with diverse backgrounds and histories.

== Athletics ==
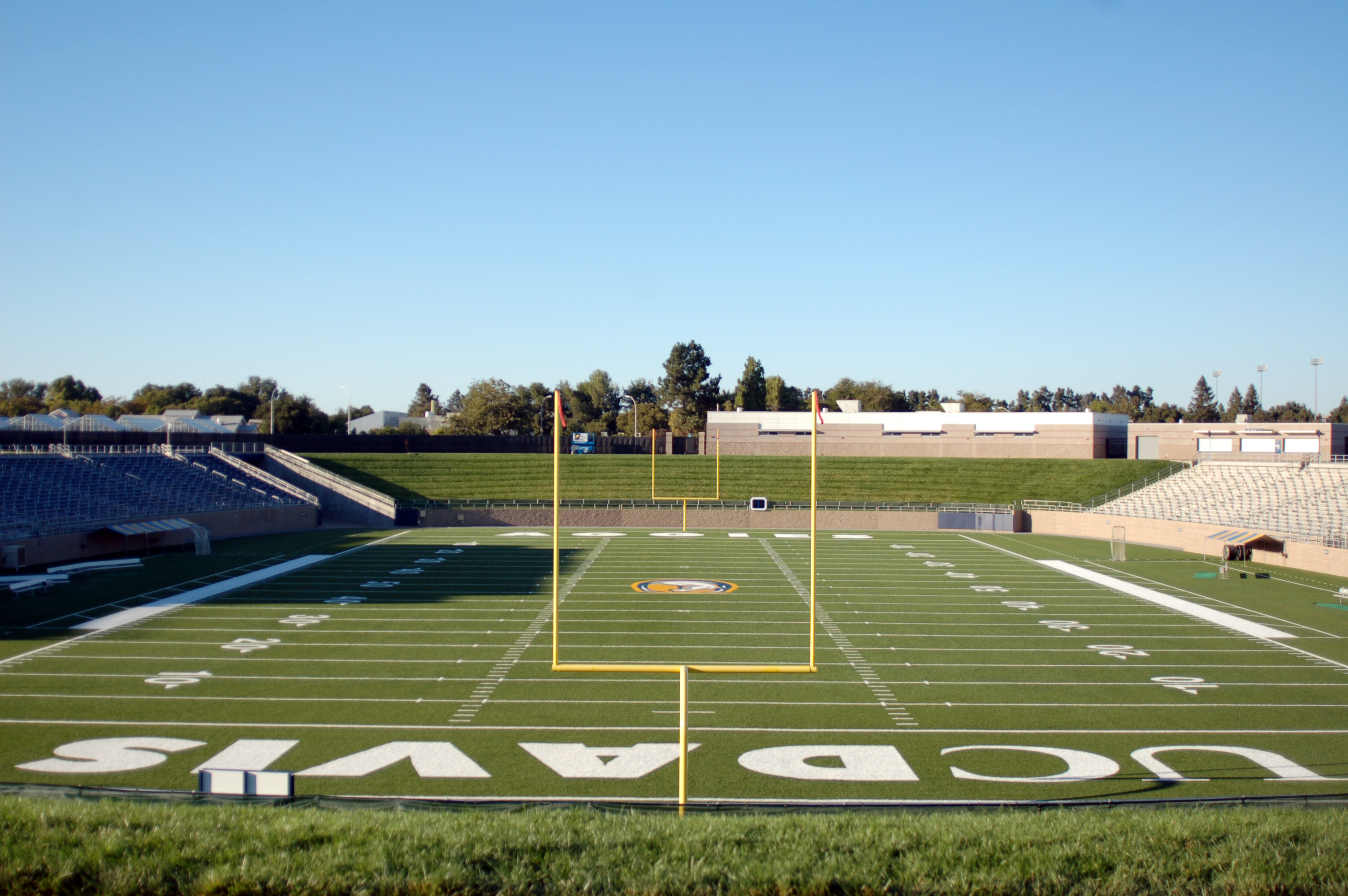
UC Davis Health Stadium

The UC Davis Aggies (also referred to as Cal Aggies or Ags) compete in NCAA Division I sports league in the Mountain West Conference. For football, the Aggies compete in Division I FCS (formerly known as Division I-AA), and are members of the Big Sky Conference, granting UC Davis the distinction of being one of only three UC campuses to field a football team (Cal and UCLA being the other two). The Aggies are also members of the Big-12 in lacrosse, Mountain Pacific Sports Federation in gymnastics, the America East Conference in field hockey, the Western Intercollegiate Rowing Association and Davis Men's Crew Club for rowing.

Davis Men's Crew Club2008 the JV boat won first in nationals at the ACRA Championships in Tennessee and in 2009 the Varsity boat got second place in nationals at the ACRA Championships. They consistently compete against teams such as Stanford, the University of Washington and UC Berkeley.

The Aggies finished first in NCAA Division II six times in 2003 and won the NACDA Directors' Cup 4 years in a row from 1999 to 2003. In 1998, the UC Davis men's basketball team won the NCAA Division II national championship despite being one of the few non-scholarship institutions in Division II at that time. They have also won NCAA Division II championships in Softball (2003), Men's Tennis (1992), and Women's Tennis (1990, 1993). These and other achievements motivated a decision (following a year of heavy discussion by campus administrators, faculty, staff, students, alumni and the local community) in 2003 for the athletics program to re-classify to Division I.

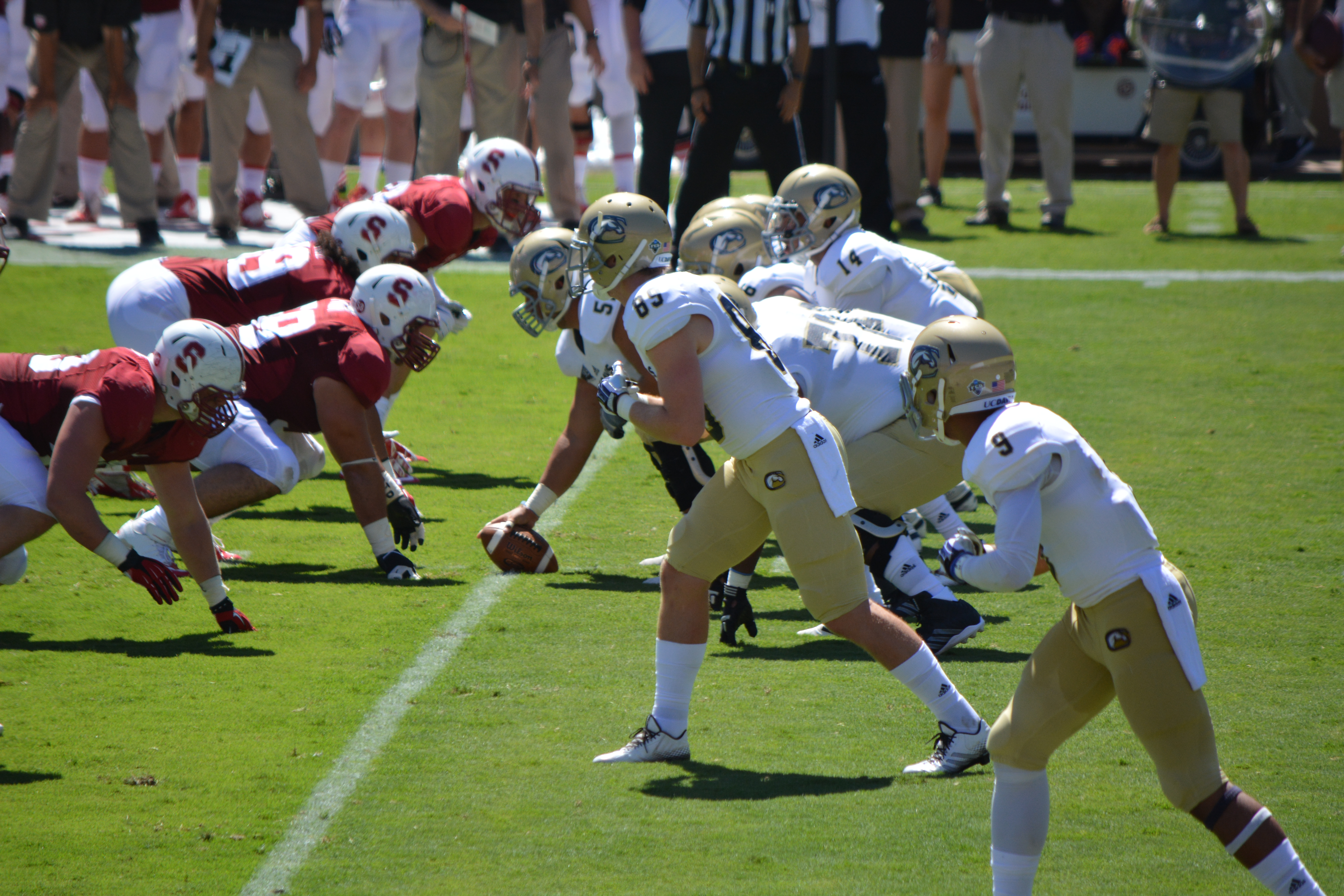
The Aggies football team lines up against Stanford in 2014

The Aggie football team plays Sacramento State in the annual Causeway Classic for a trophy made from a Yolo Causeway core sample. The team also plays Cal Poly San Luis Obispo in the annual Battle for the Golden Horseshoe. UC Davis students gather at sporting events to rally as the Aggie Pack, the largest student-run school spirit organization in the United States. The Aggie Pack cheers on the sports team along with the Spirit Squad to the music of the Cal Aggie Marching Band and its alumni band. Aggie Stadium is the home of the UC Davis football and lacrosse teams.

Because of budget pressure, wrestling was cut from the athletic department in April 2010. Other cuts included men's swimming, men's indoor track, and women's rowing. The athletics department had to cut $1.79 million out of the budget. 14 women's teams and 9 men's teams were funded for the 2010–2011 school year.

The official school colors are blue and gold. The blue is due to the UC's early connection to Yale and as a result is often referred to as "Yale Blue" (e.g., see). and UCD's official blue, usually called "Aggie Blue", is Pantone 295, which is distinct from Yale Blue (approximately Pantone 289).

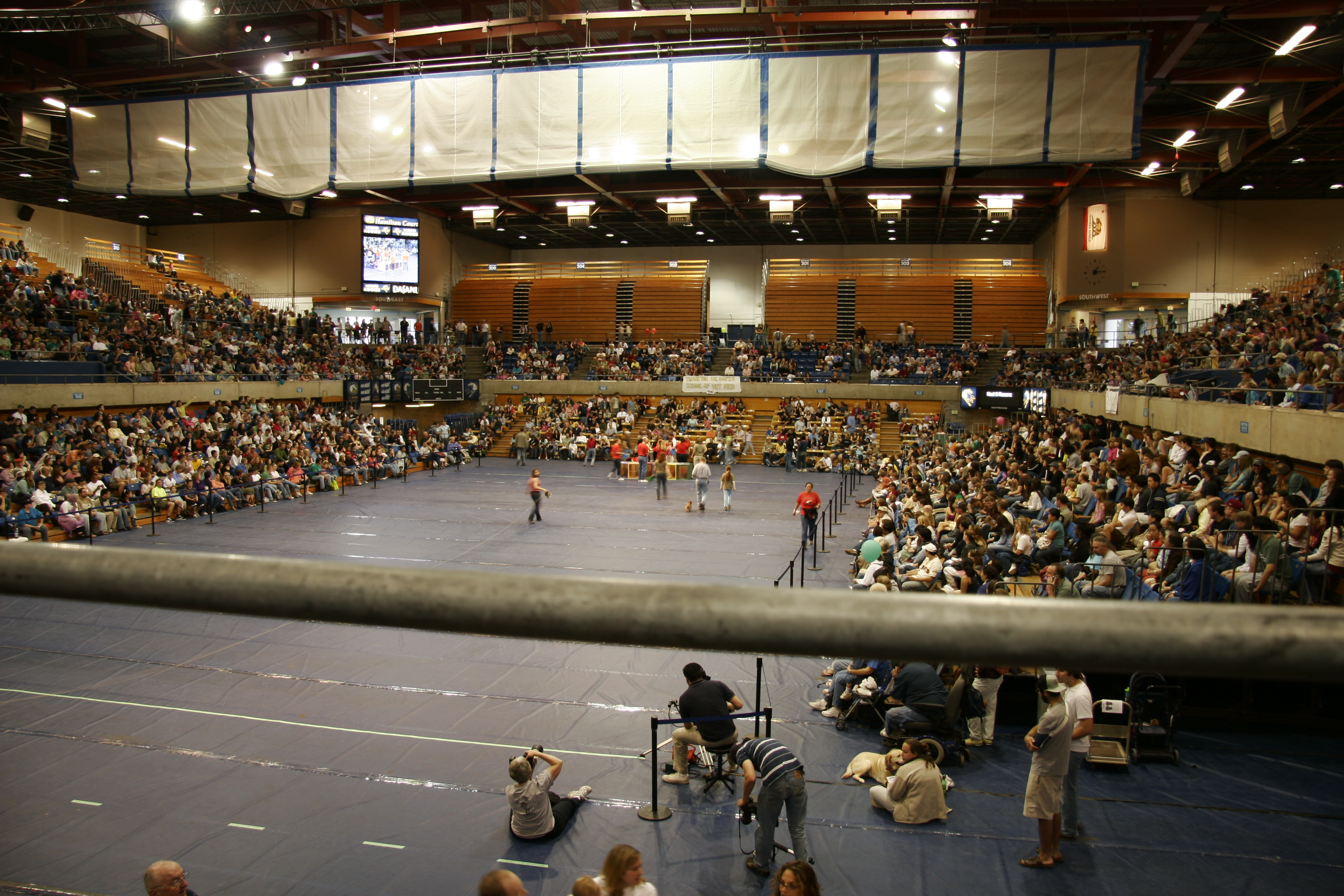
The Pavilion at the ARC Center

The official school mascot is the Aggies.

== Sustainability ==
UC Davis has implemented many environmentally sustainable features on campus. In the Fall of 2010, UCD opened a renovated Dining Commons in the Cuarto living area. The dining hall uses local produce and promotes sustainability. The university operates twenty LEED-certified buildings across three of the five overarching LEED categories. Examples include the Robert Mondavi Institute for Wine and Food Science, the first brewery, winery or food-processing facility in the world to achieve Platinum-level certification and the Tahoe Environmental Research Center (TERC) at Lake Tahoe, one of only five laboratories in the world to achieve Platinum-level certification. It developed UC Davis West Village as a "zero net energy" community.

The university received two Best Practice Awards at the 2009 annual Sustainability Conference, held by the University of California, California State University and the California Community Colleges, for the campus's lighting retrofit project and sustainable design in new construction.

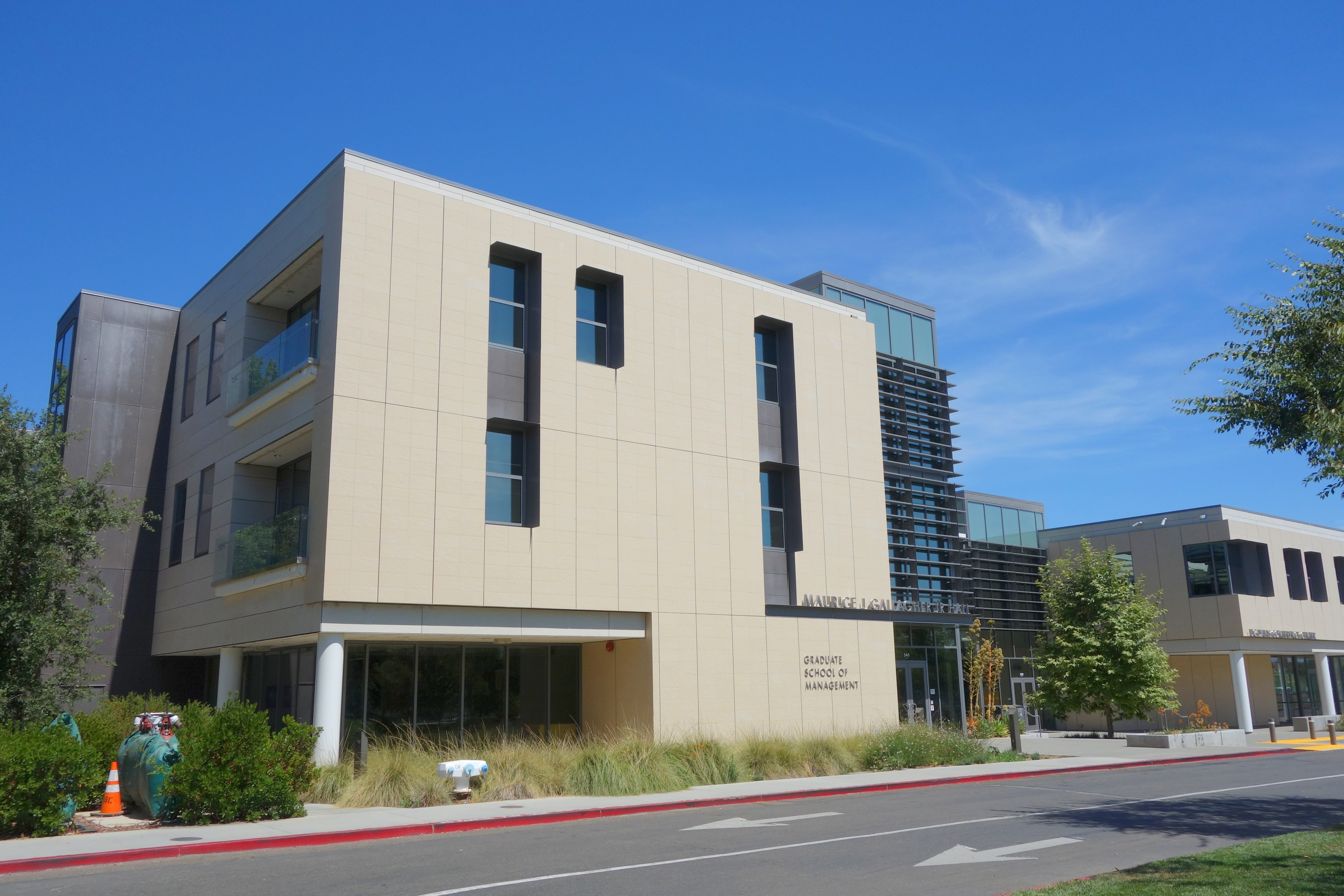
Gallagher Hall, one of the many LEED-certified buildings on campus

UC Davis harvests olives from the old trees on campus to produce olive oil and table olives for use in campus dining rooms. It has designed landscaping with drought-tolerant trees and other plants. The campus operates its own landfill, where it converts landfill (methane) gas to energy. For its efforts in campus sustainability, UC Davis earned an A− on the 2011 College Sustainability Report Card, one of 27 universities to achieve this, the highest grade awarded.

In February 2014, UC Davis and Diamond Developers formed a joint venture to create a sustainable city in Dubai, United Arab Emirates. The draft design for the sustainable city in Dubai called for an "eco-village" on 120 acres with enough housing for 1,200 people. The plan called for K-12 education, apartments, single family homes, and retail shops. In May 2015, UC Davis and Diamond expanded the joint venture to include sustainability professional training program.

UC Davis became the first university to implement requiring payment of a fee for all single-use bags distributed on campus; it is working to become the first university campus to ban plastic bags entirely.

UC Davis is also home to the Agricultural Sustainability Institute (ASI), which is part of the College of Agricultural and Environmental Sciences (CAES). ASI provides leadership for research, teaching, outreach, and extension efforts in agricultural and food systems sustainability at the Davis campus and throughout the UC system.

UC Davis hosted the Governors' Global Climate Summit 3 (GGCS3), an international climate forum for the top leaders of local, regional, national and international entities, as well as those from academia, business and nonprofits. The summit worked to broaden national partnerships in continuing to grow a clean, green economy. The summit included more than 1,500 attendees from more than 80 countries.

== Administration ==
=== List of chancellors ===
The following persons had led the UC Davis campus as chancellor since 1958:

No.	Portrait	Chancellor	Term start	Term end	Refs.
1		Stanley B. Freeborn	September 25, 1958	June 30, 1959	
2		Emil M. Mrak	July 1, 1959	June 30, 1969	
3		James Henry Meyer	July 1, 1969	June 30, 1987	
4		Theodore L. Hullar	July 1, 1987	February 29, 1994	
acting		Larry N. Vanderhoef (Note: Although Vanderhoef originally planned to step down on June 30, 2009, he decided to stay on until August 16, 2009, at the request of UC president Mark G. Yudof.)	March 1, 1994	April 6, 1994	
5		Larry N. Vanderhoef	April 6, 1994	August 16, 2009	
6		Linda Katehi (Note: Katehi was placed on "investigatory administrative leave" on April 27, 2016, after she was accused of violating of several University of California policies. She resigned on August 9, 2016.)	August 17, 2009	August 9, 2016	
acting		Ralph Hexter (Note: Hexter became acting chancellor on April 27, 2016, when Katehi was placed on "investigatory administrative leave" and continued in that capacity after Katehi submitted her resignation until a replacement chancellor was installed.)	April 27, 2016	July 31, 2017	
7		Gary S. May	August 1, 2017	present	

Table notes:

== Alumni ==
UC Davis currently has over 260,000 living alumni. University faculty, alumni, and researchers have been the recipients of two Nobel Prizes, one Fields Medal, a Presidential Medal of Freedom, three Pulitzer Prizes, three MacArthur Fellowships, and a National Medal of Science. Of the current faculty, 30 have been elected to the National Academy of Sciences, 36 to the American Academy of Arts and Sciences, and 13 to the National Academy of Medicine.

Notable alumni of UC Davis include two astronauts; scientist Charles Moen Rice, 2020 Nobel Prize in Physiology or Medicine laureate and Katherine Jungjohann; US Treasurer Anna Escobedo Cabral; Chevron CEO John S. Watson; entrepreneur Jason Lucash; and actor Matthew Moy. Notable faculty include two-time Pulitzer Prize-winning historian Alan Taylor and painter Wayne Thiebaud.

Notable UC Davis alumni include:

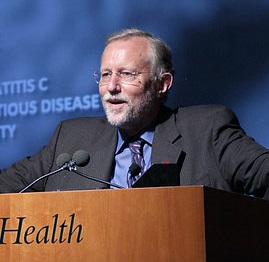
Charles M. Rice, 2020 Nobel Prize in Physiology or Medicine laureate

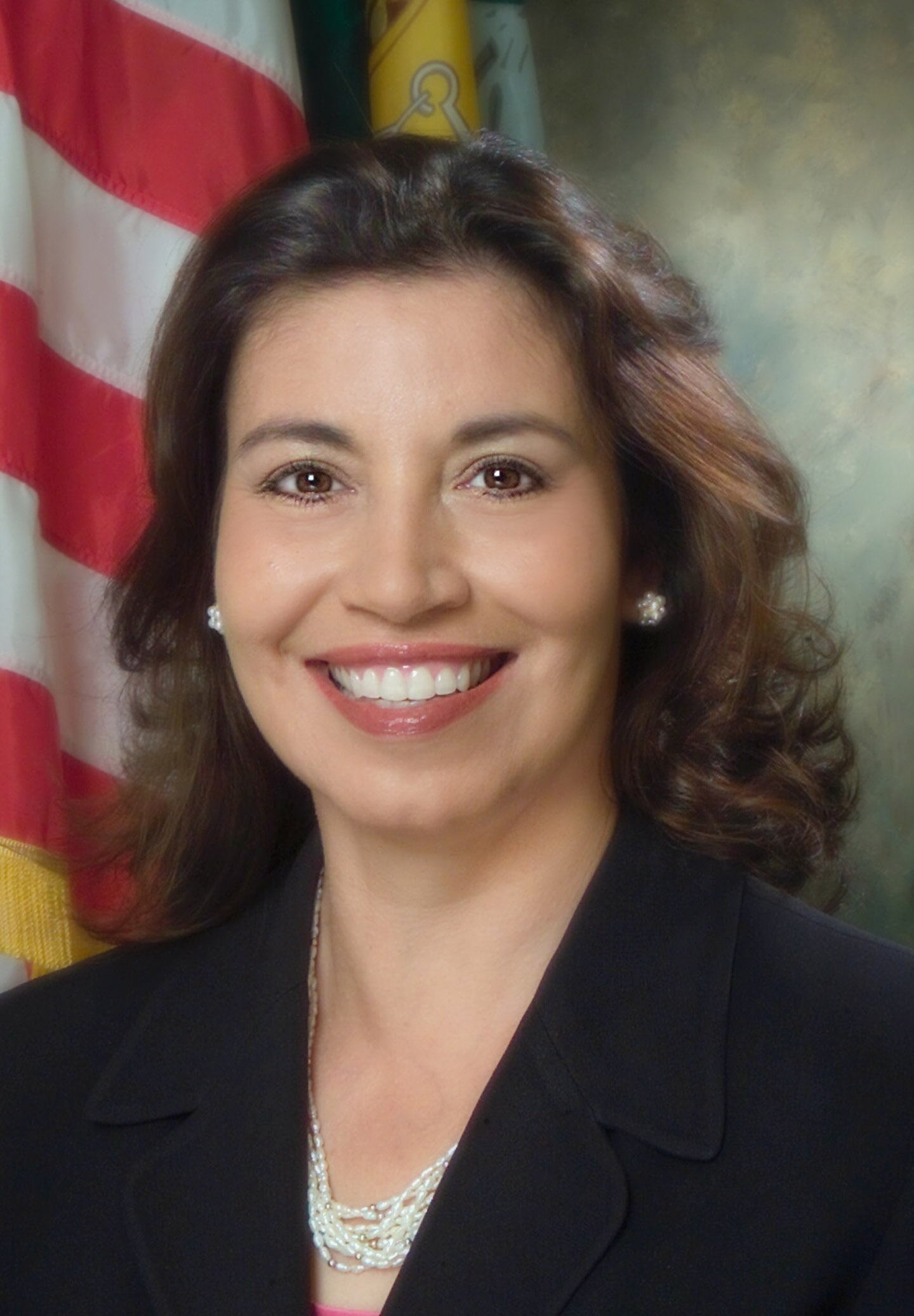
Anna Escobedo Cabral, Treasurer

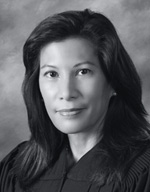
Tani Cantil-Sakauye, Chief Justice of California

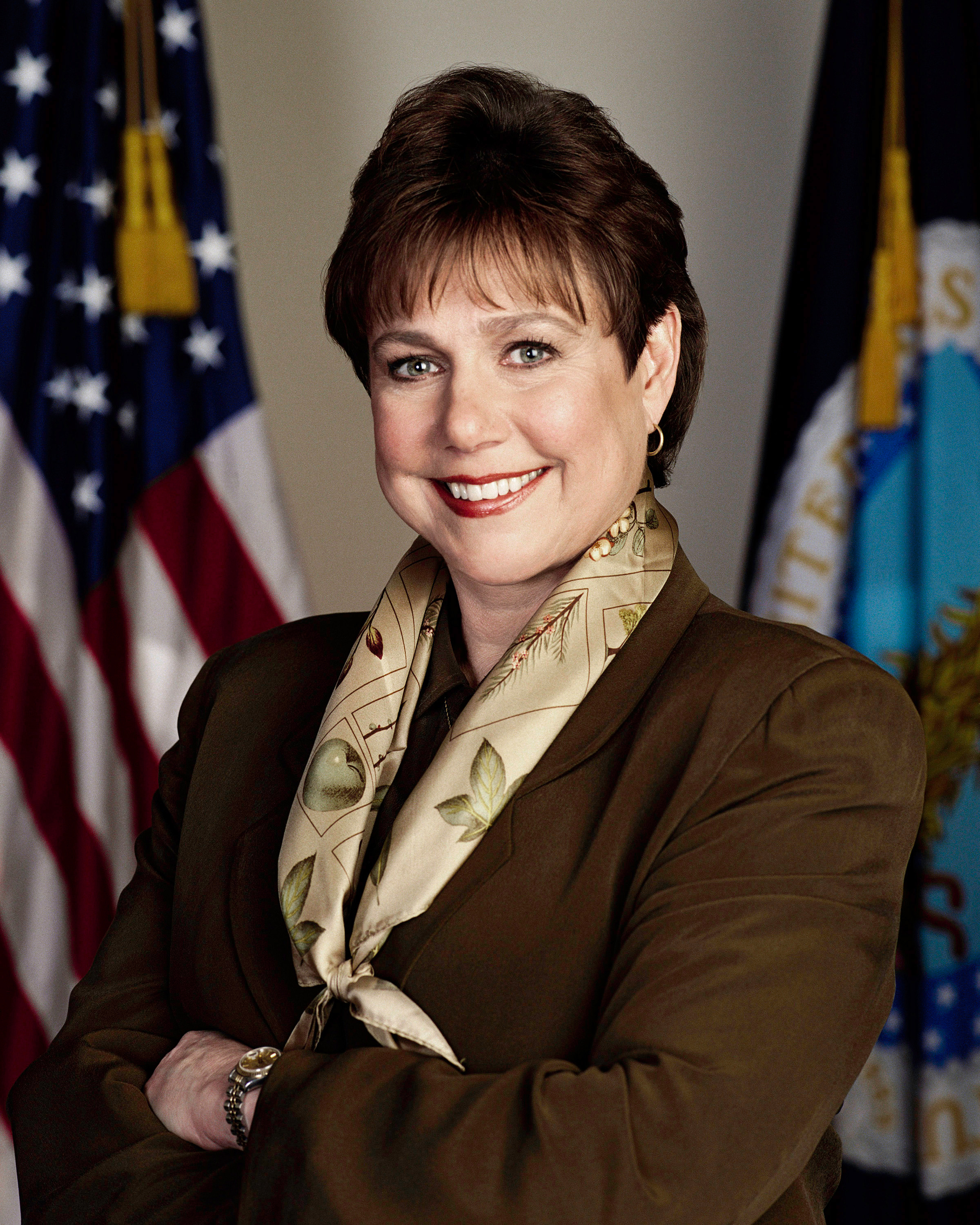
Ann Veneman, former United States Secretary of Agriculture

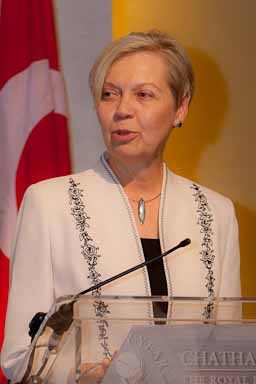
DeAnne Julius, American-British economist

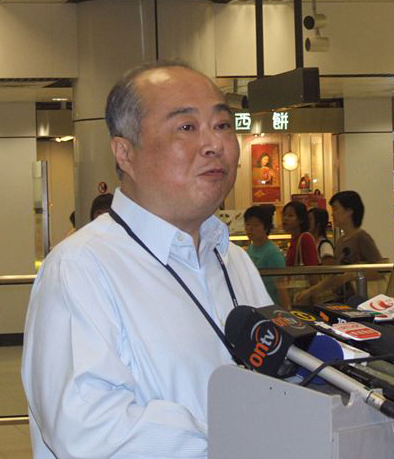
Sir Chow Chung-kong, chairman of Hong Kong Exchanges and Clearing

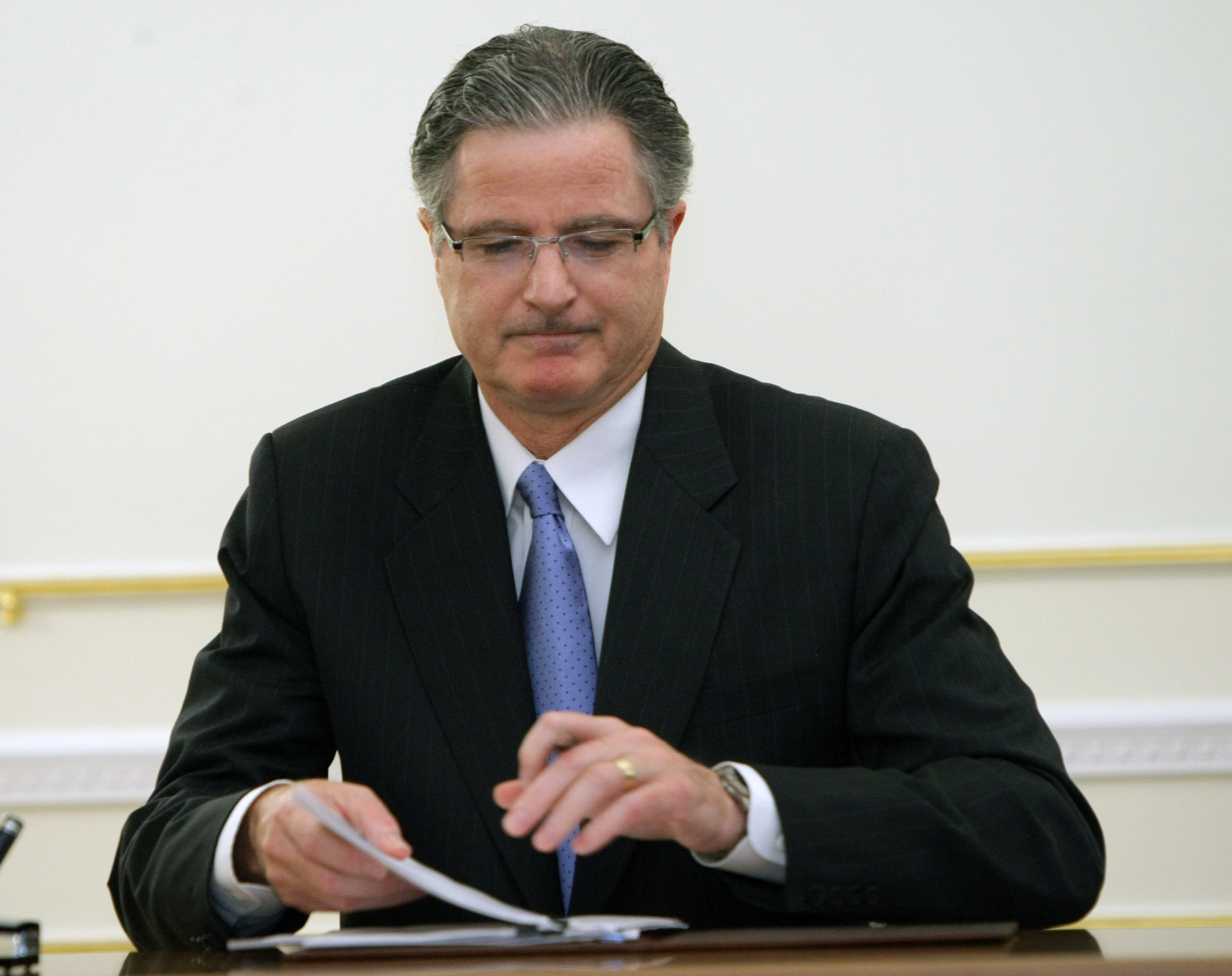
John S. Watson, former CEO of Chevron

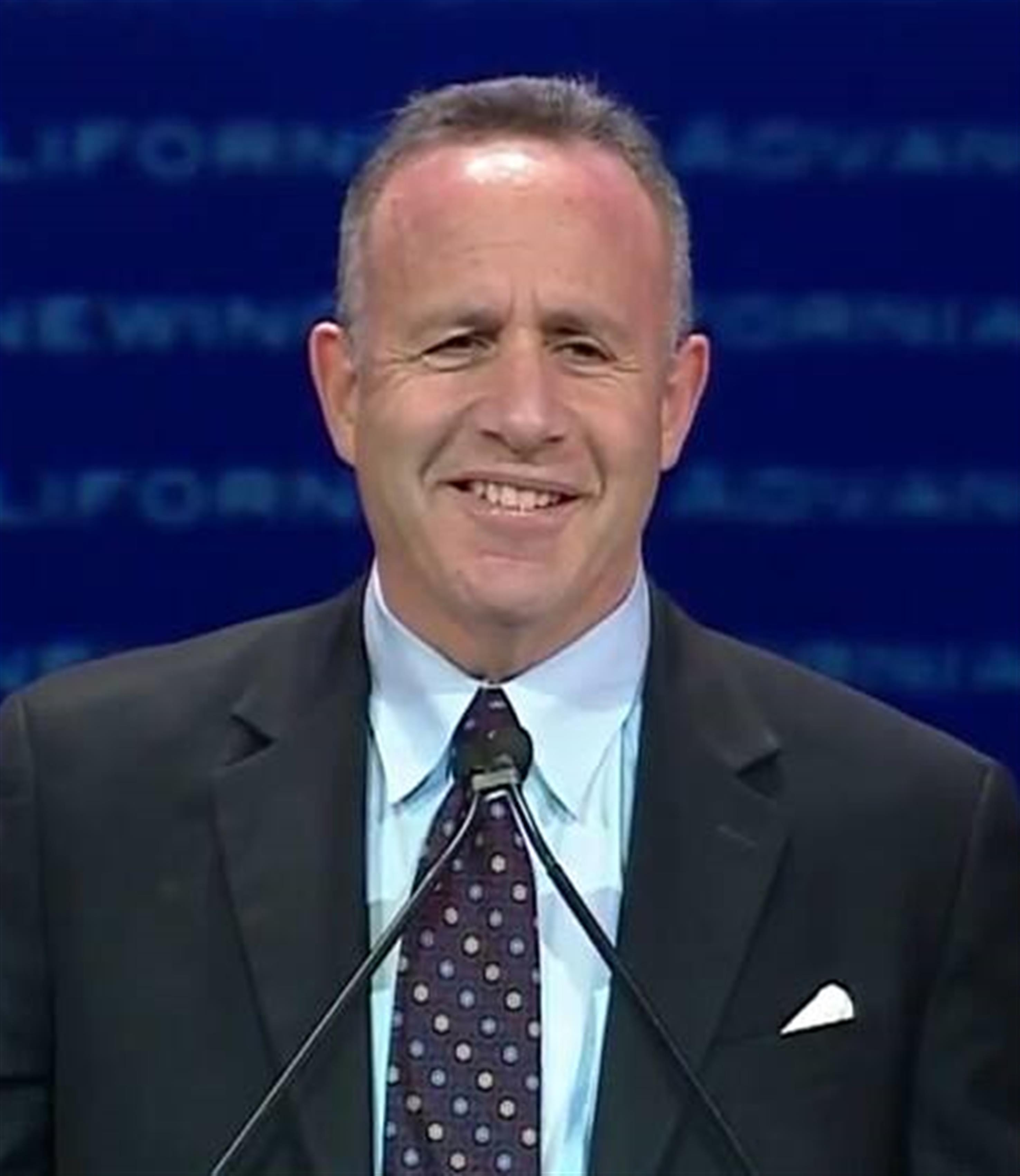
Darrell Steinberg, mayor of Sacramento

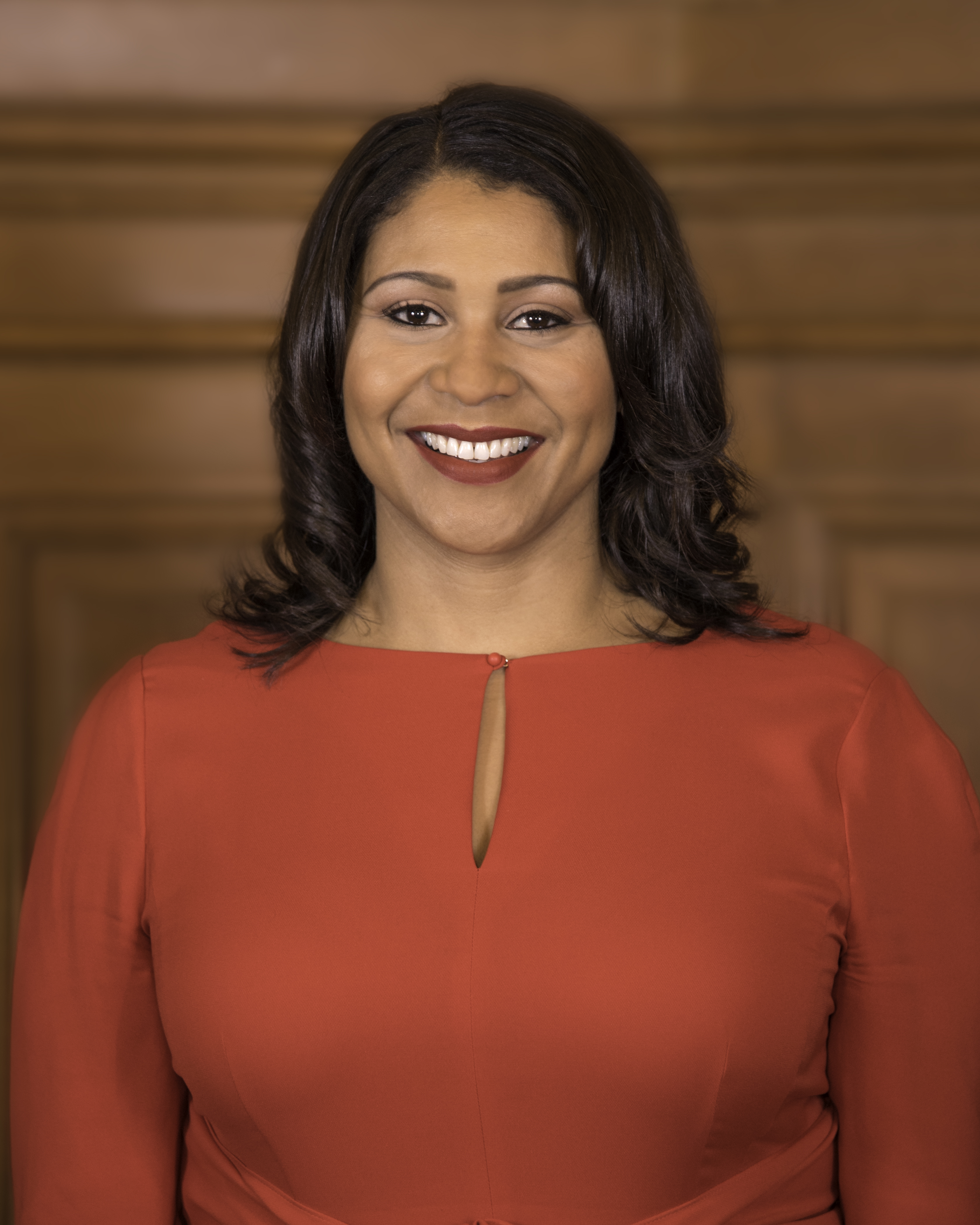
London Breed, former mayor of San Francisco

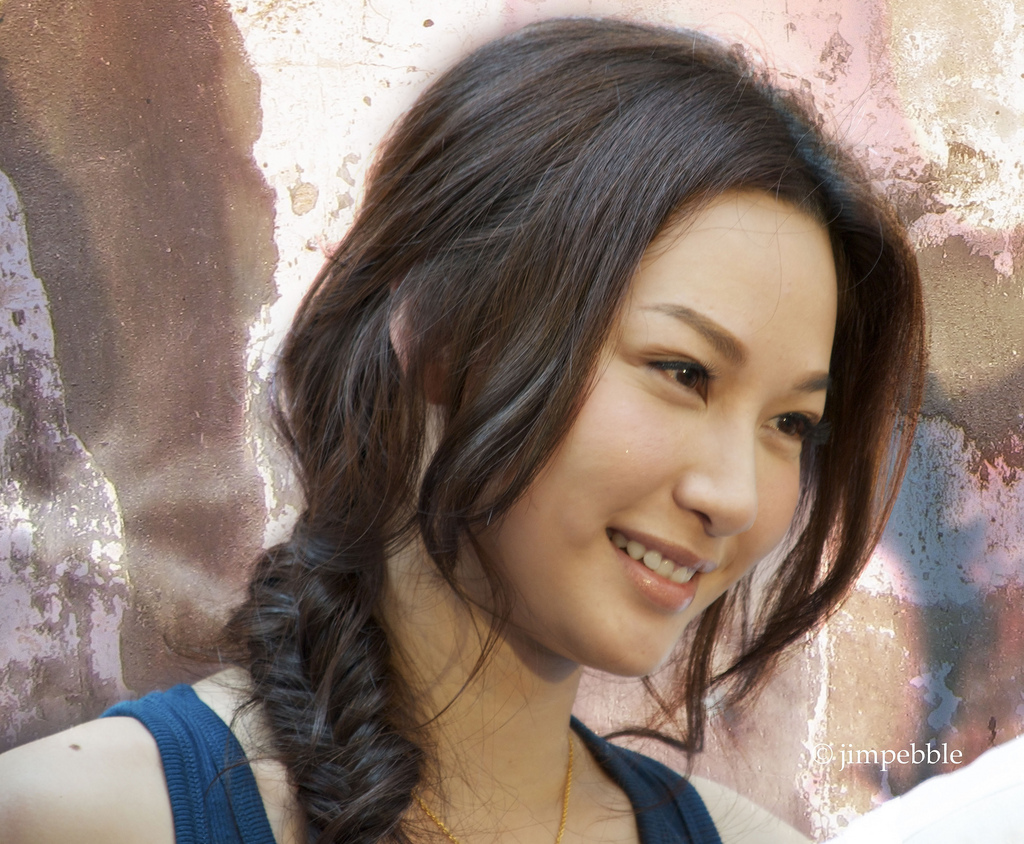
Kate Tsui, Hong Kong actress

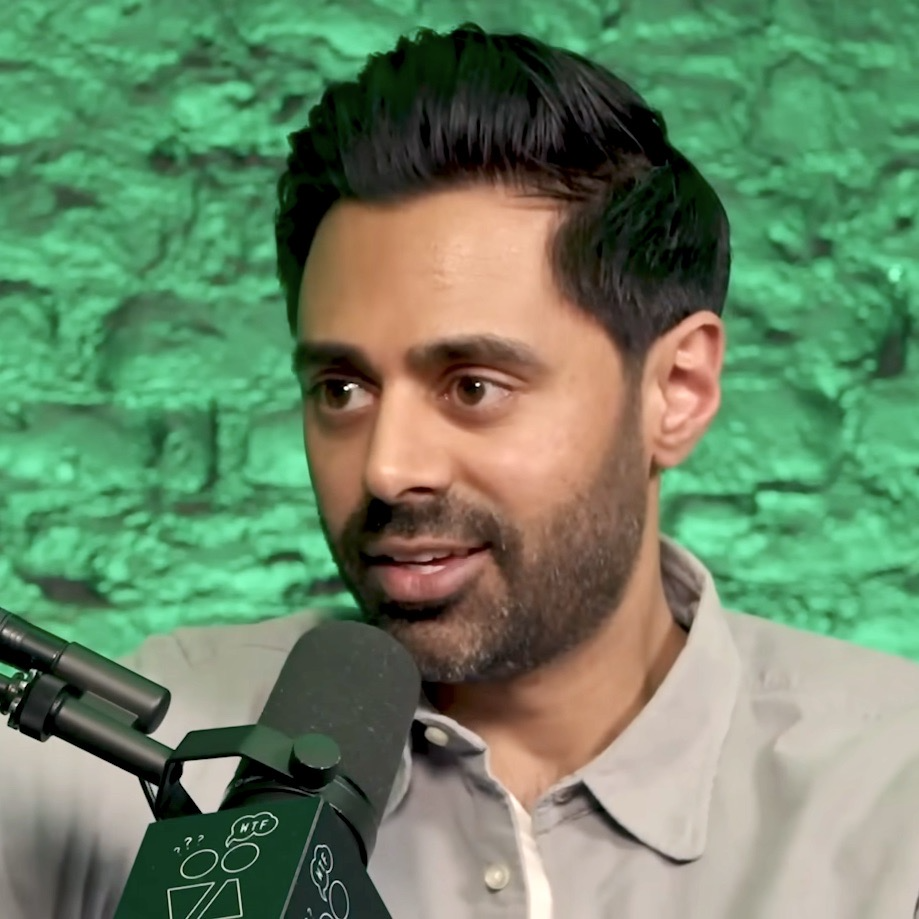
Hasan Minhaj, actor and comedian

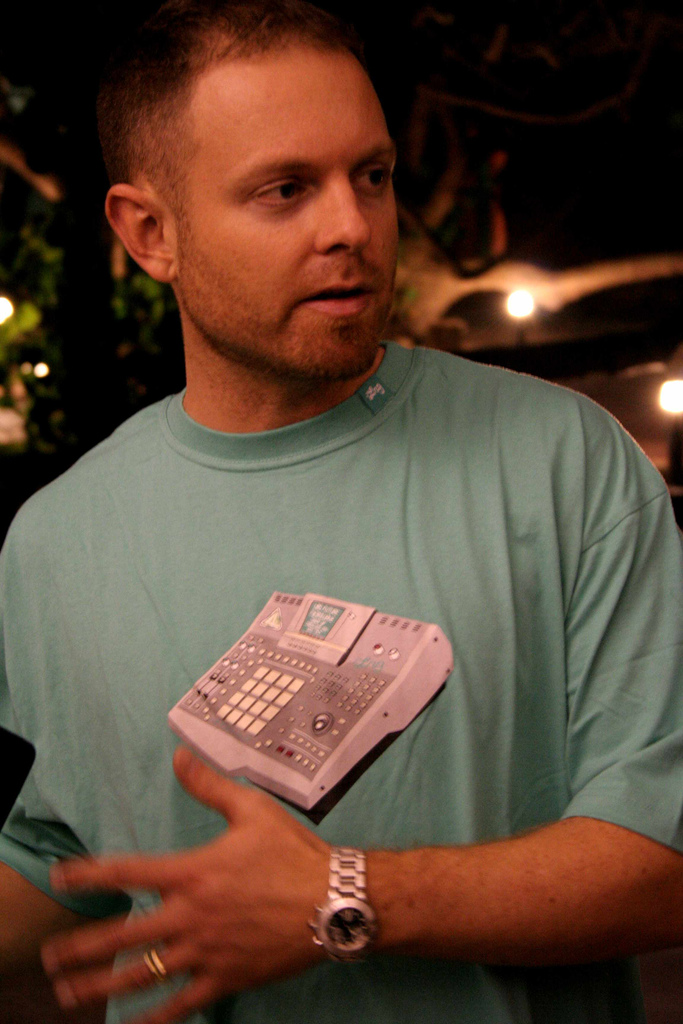
DJ Shadow, music producer and DJ

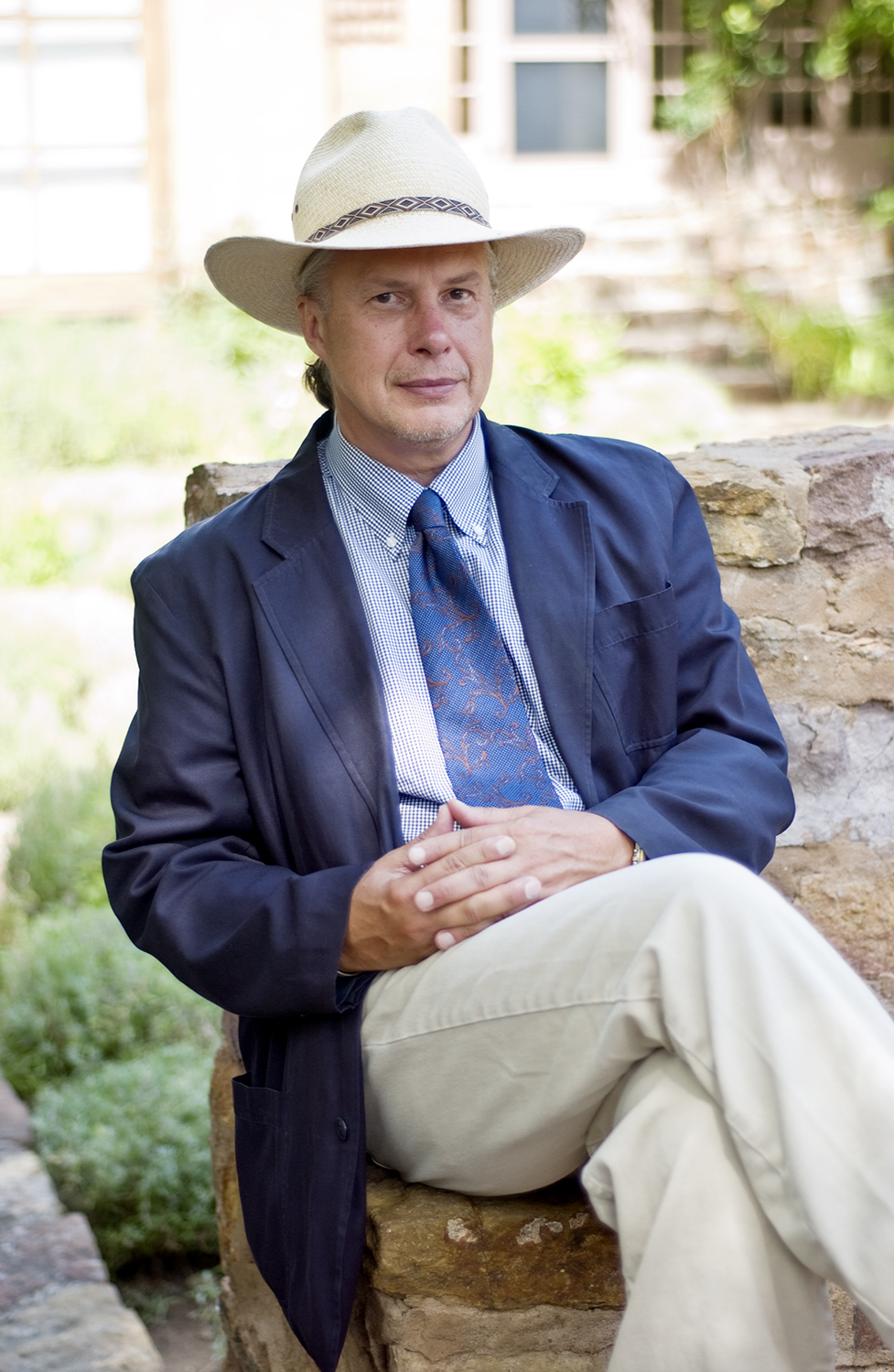
James F. Brooks, historian and professor

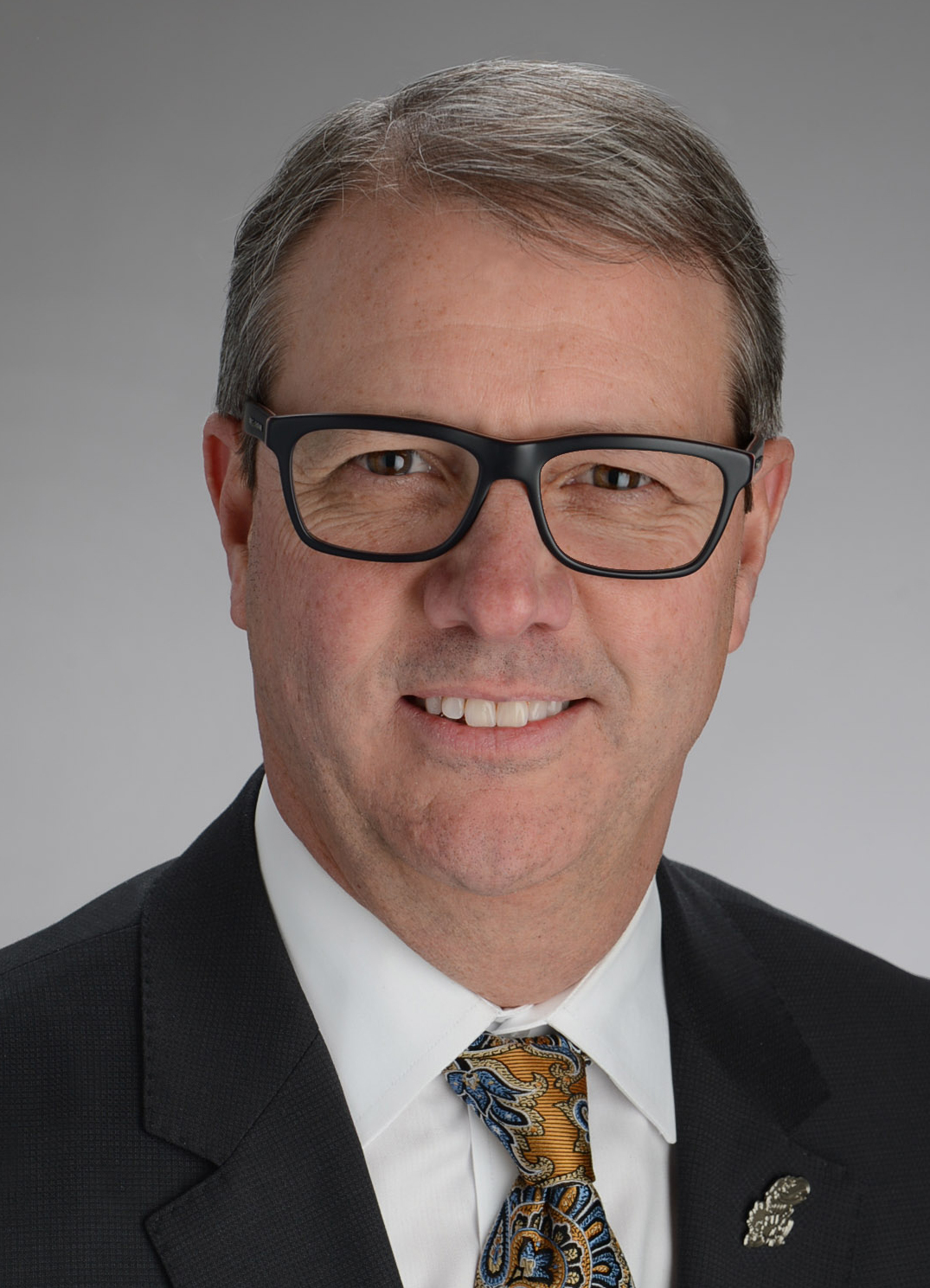
Doug Girod, chancellor of the University of Kansas

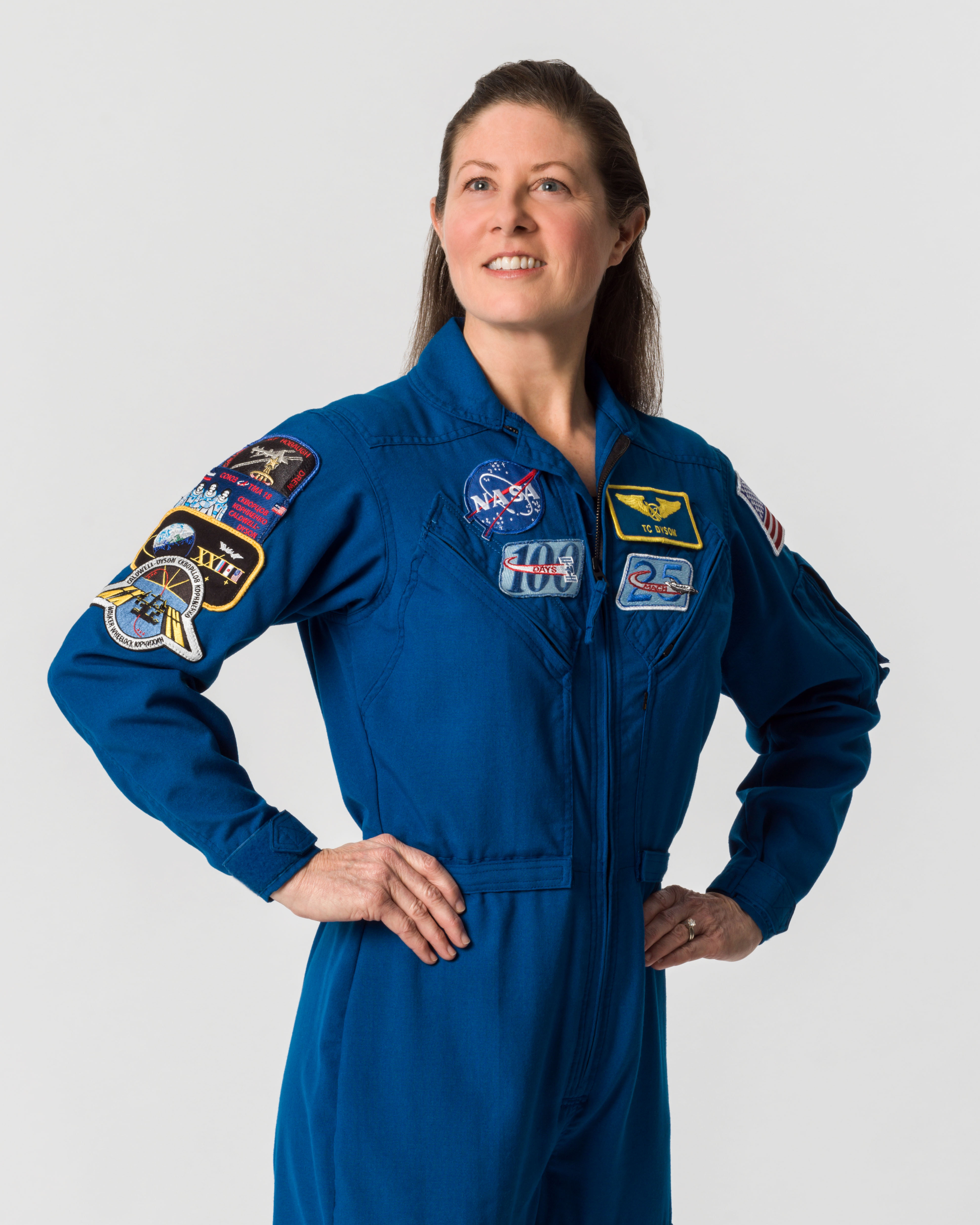
Tracy Caldwell Dyson, chemist and NASA astronaut

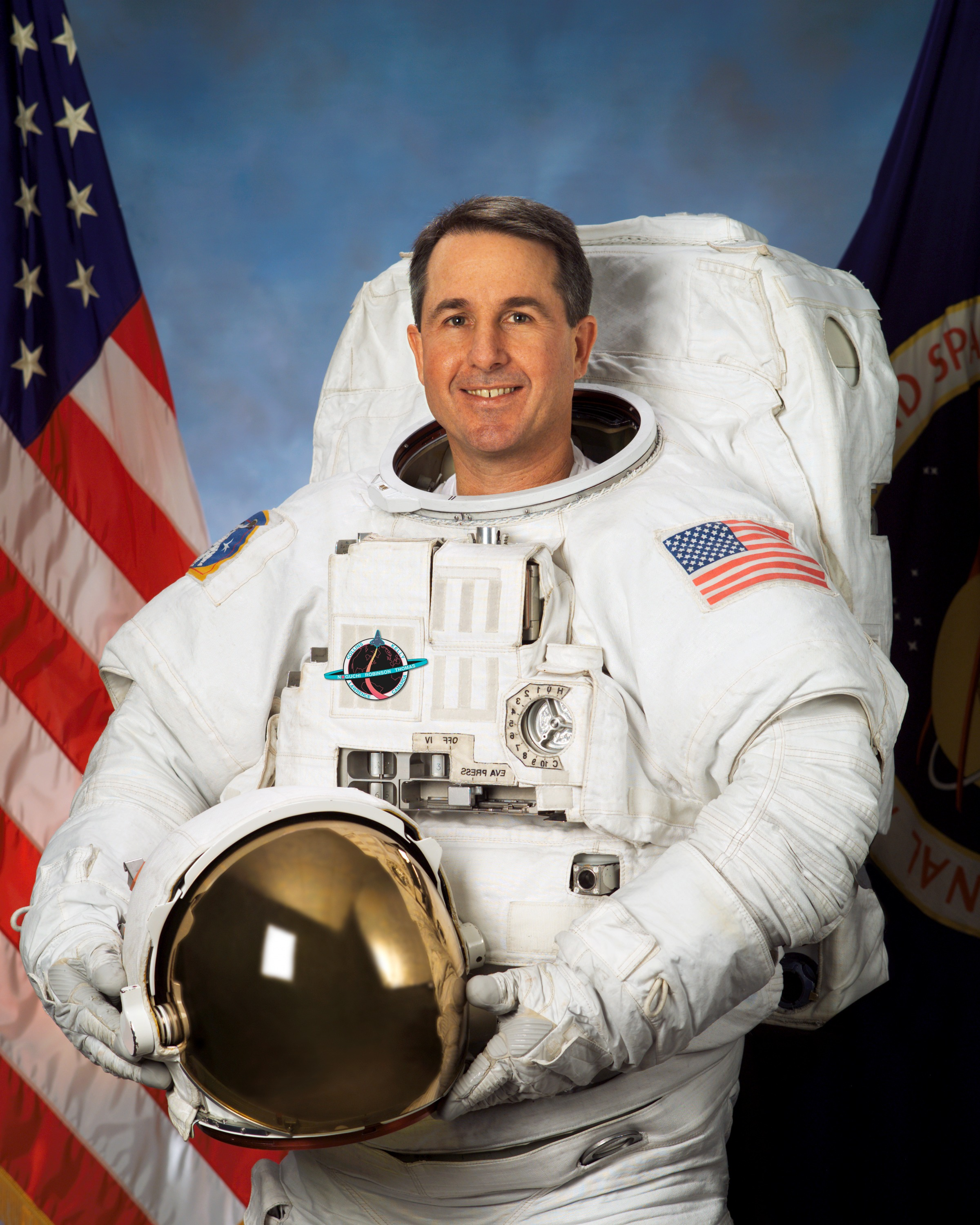
Stephen Robinson, NASA astronaut

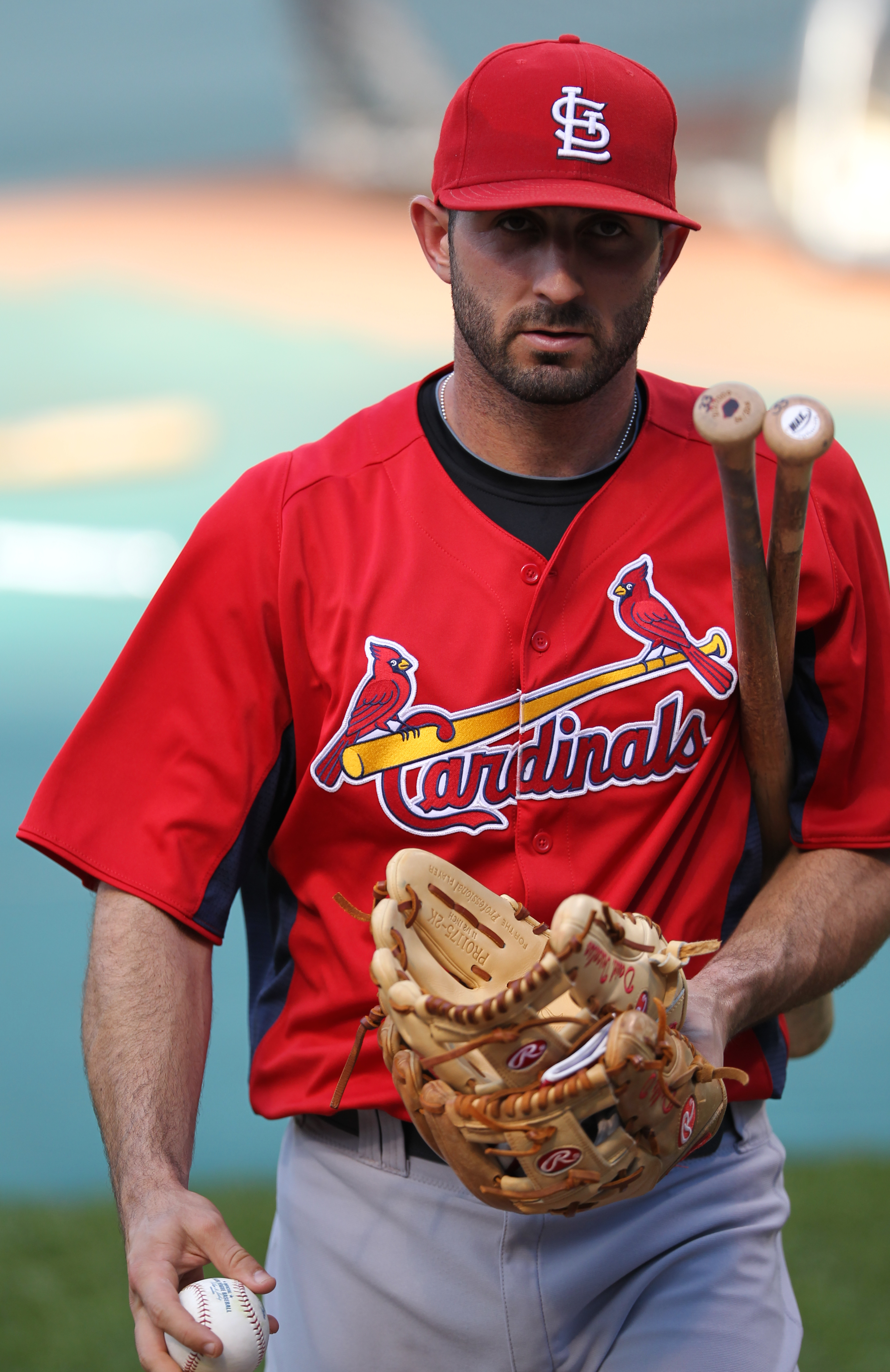
Daniel Descalso, infielder for the Arizona Diamondbacks

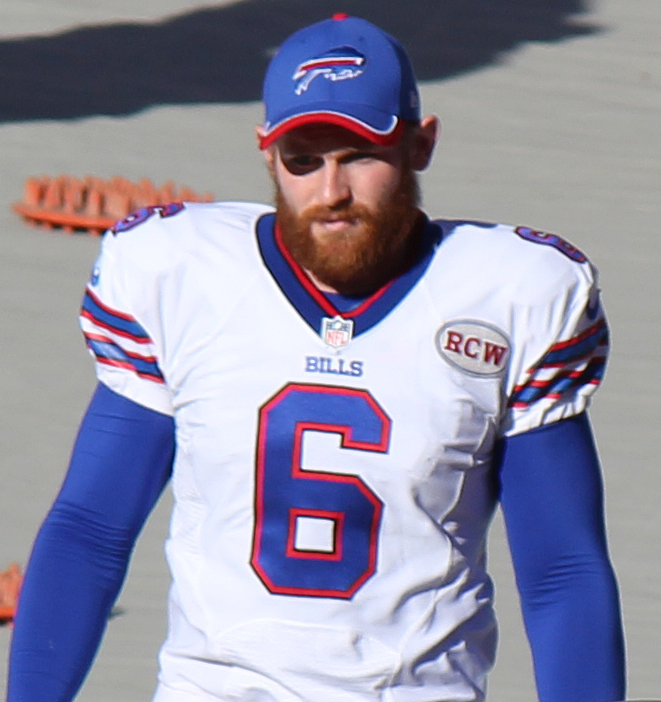
Colton Schmidt, American football punter

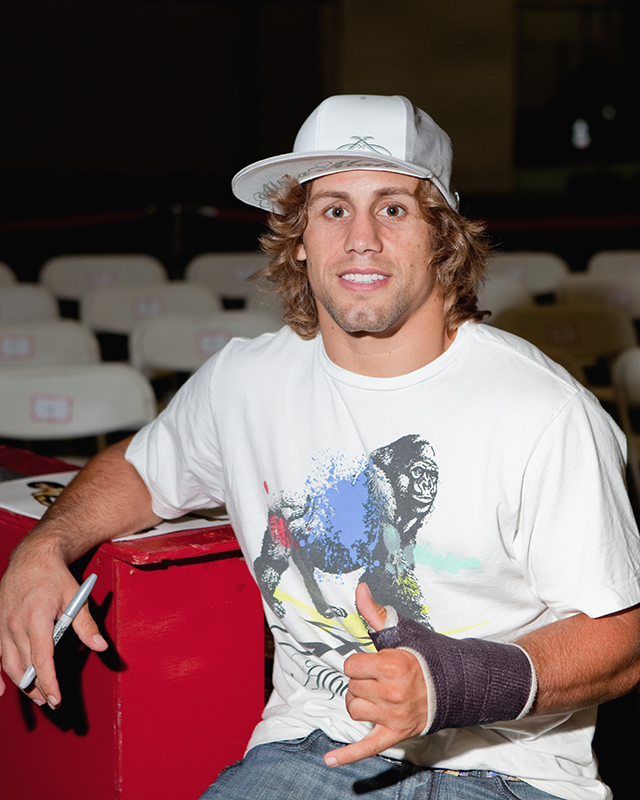
Urijah Faber, mixed martial artist

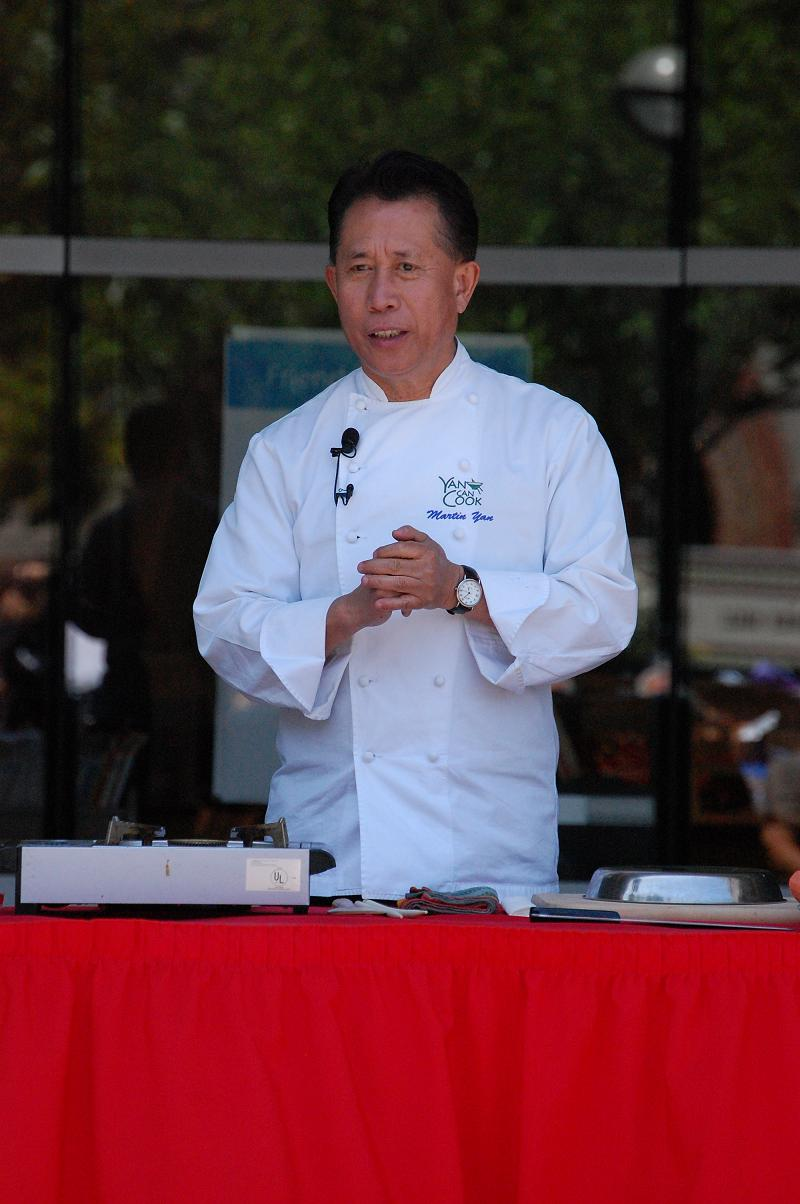
Martin Yan, cooking show host and food writer

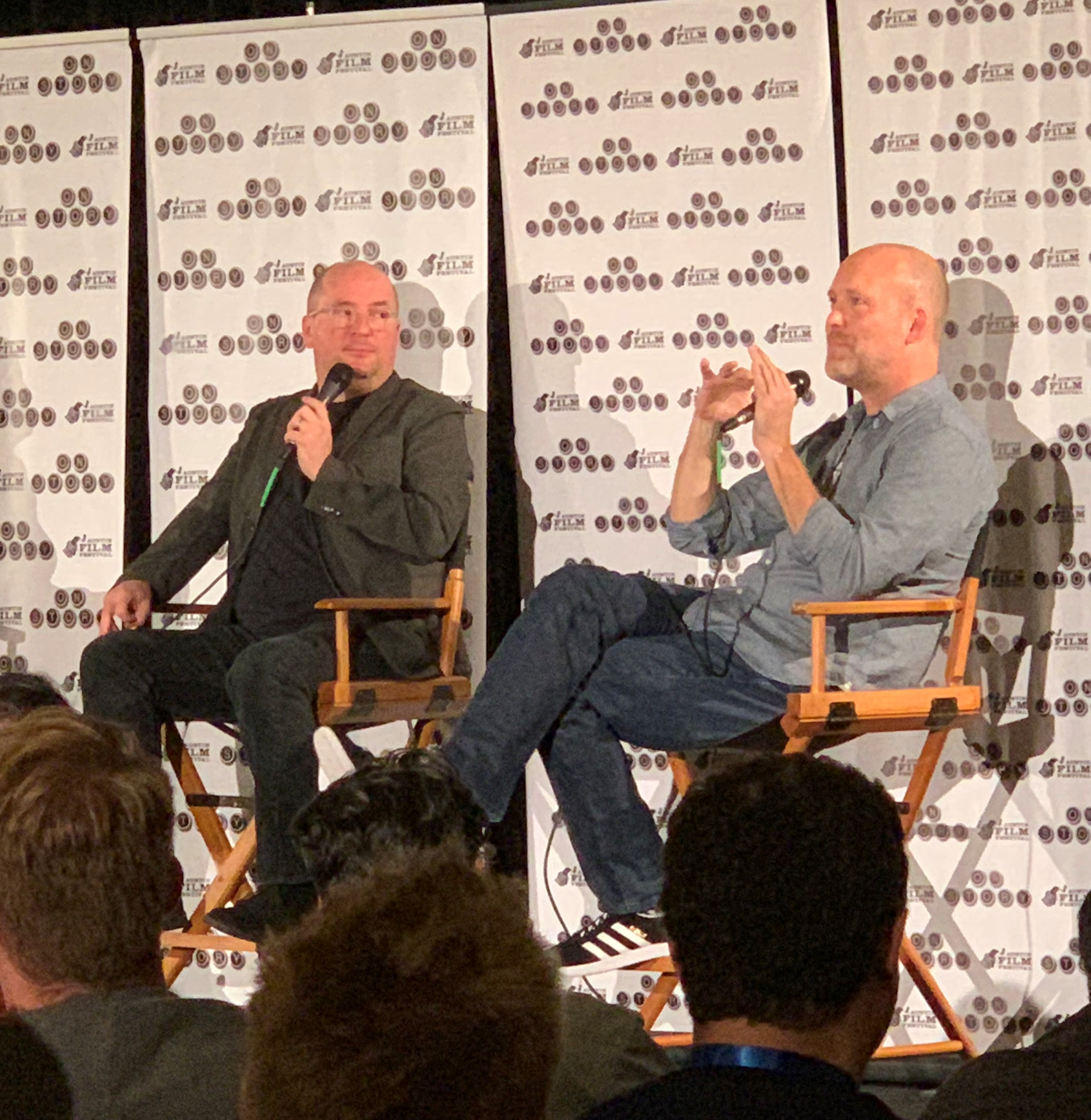
Christopher Markus and Stephen McFeely, screenwriters and producers

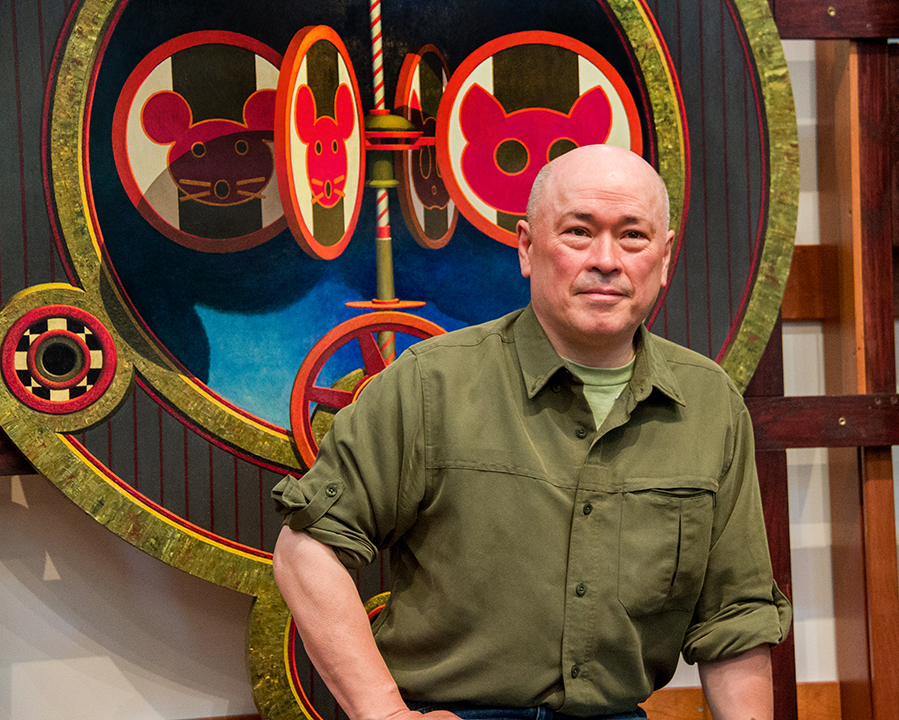
Richard Whitten, visual artist

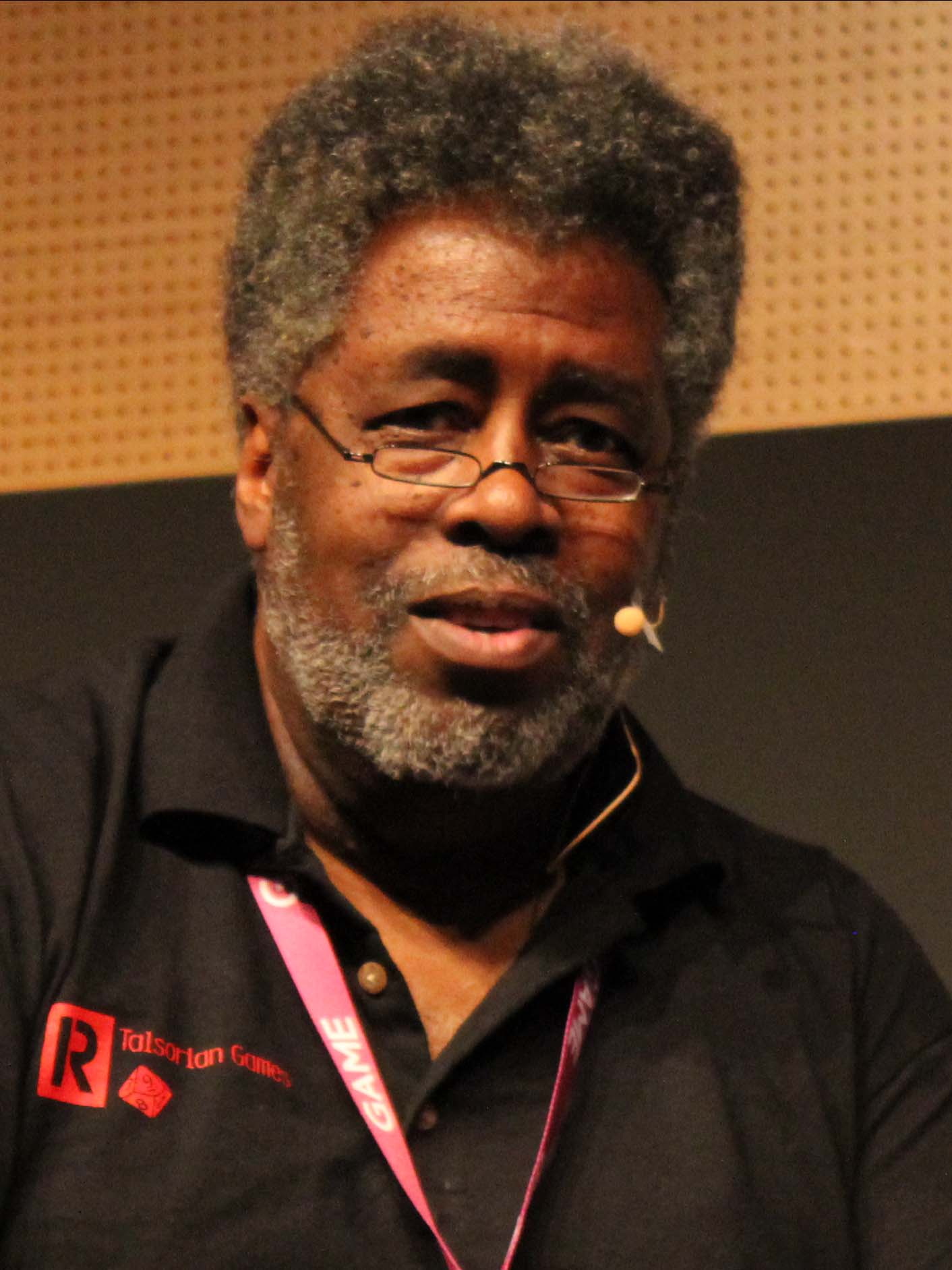
Mike Pondsmith, a story and videogame designer, who inspired the video game development of Cyberpunk 2077.

== See also ==
- C.N. Gorman Museum
- Justice Waits
- Manetti Shrem Museum of Art
- Mondavi Center
- The Pavilion (UC Davis)
- Jerry Hinsdale
