= List of Institute of Food Technologists presidents =

This is a list of the people who have served as president of the Institute of Food Technologists since its establishment in 1939.

- 1939–41: Samuel C. Prescott
- 1941–42: Laurence V. Burton
- 1942–43: Roy C. Newton
- 1943–44: William V. Cruess
- 1944–45: Fred C. Blanck
- 1945–46: Fred W. Tanner
- 1946–47: Ellery R. Harvey
- 1947–48: George J. Hucker
- 1948–49: Helmut C. Diehl
- 1949–50: Carl R. Fellers
- 1950–51: Paul F. Sharp
- 1951–52: Charles N. Frey
- 1952–53: Bernard E. Proctor
- 1953–54: Berton S. Clark
- 1954–55: Philip K. Bates
- 1955–56: LaVerne E. Clifcorn
- 1956–57: George F. Garantz
- 1957–58: Emil M. Mrak
- 1958–59: Askel G. Olsen
- 1959–60: Ray B. Wakefield
- 1960–61: Irmi J. Hutchings
- 1961–62: Harold W. Schultz
- 1962–63: John M. Jackson
- 1963–64: C. Olin Ball
- 1964–65: Charles T. Townsend
- 1965–66: Maynard A. Joslyn
- 1966–67: John H. Nair
- 1967–68: George F. Stewart
- 1968–69: Bernard L. Oser
- 1969–70: Herbert E. Robinson
- 1970–71: Hans Lineweaver
- 1971–72: Richard L. Hall
- 1972–73: Ben F. Buchanan
- 1973–74: Reid T. Milner
- 1974–75: Charles F. Niven, Jr.
- 1975–76: Ernest J. Briskey
- 1976–77: John C. Ayres
- 1977–78: Howard E. Bauman
- 1978–79: Bernard S. Schweigert
- 1979–80: Walter L. Clark
- 1980–81: Frederick Jack Francis
- 1981–82: Arthur T. Schramm
- 1982–83: Owen R. Fennema
- 1983–84: Gilbert A. Leveille
- 1984–85: Bernard J. Liska
- 1985–86: Charles J. Bates
- 1986–87: John J. Powers
- 1987–88: Roy E. Morse
- 1988–89: Theodore P. Labuza
- 1989–90: Paul F. Hopper
- 1990–91: Daryl B. Lund
- 1991–92: John H. Litchfield
- 1992–93: David R. Lineback
- 1993–94: Adolph (Al) S. Clausi
- 1994–95: Roy G. Arnold
- 1995–96: Francis F. Busta
- 1996–97: Robert E. Smith
- 1997–98: Mary K. Wagner
- 1998–99: Bruce R. Stillings
- 1999–2000: Charles E. Manley
- 2000–01: Mary K. Schmidl
- 2001–02: Philip E. Nelson
- 2002–03: Mark R. McLellan
- 2003–04: C. Ann Hollingsworth
- 2004–05: Herbert F. Stone
- 2005–06: Margaret A. Lawson
- 2006–07: Dennis R. Heldman
- 2007–08: John D. Floros
- 2008–09: Sheri Schellhaass
- 2009–10: Marianne Gillette
- 2010-11: Robert B. Gravani
- 2011–12: Roger A. Clemens
- 2012–13: John Ruff
- 2013–14: Janet Collins
- 2014–15: Mary Ellen Camire
- 2015–16: Colin Dennis
- 2016–17: John Coupland
- 2019: Michele Perchonok
