= Samuel Cate Prescott =

American food scientist and microbiologist (1872–1962)

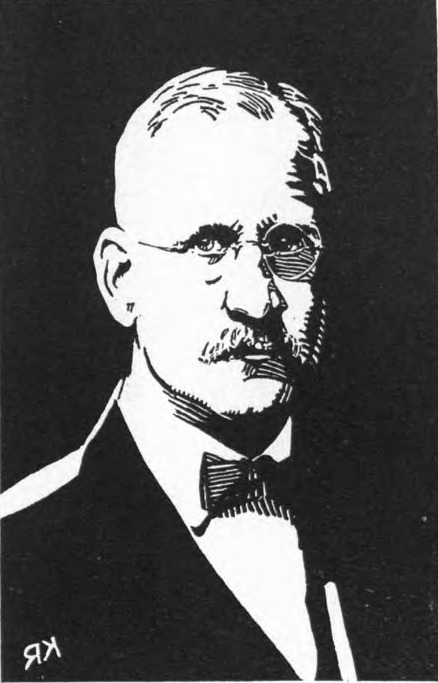
- Born: April 5, 1872; South Hampton, New Hampshire, United States
- Died: March 19, 1962 (aged 89); Cambridge, Massachusetts, United States
- Education: Massachusetts Institute of Technology
- Known for: Time-temperature studies in canning, food microbiology, President of the American Society for Microbiology (ASM, then Society of American Bacteriologists (SAB) (1919)), first president of the Institute of Food Technologists (IFT) (1939–41)
- Awards: IFT Nicholas Appert Award – 1943; IFT Stephen M. Babcock Award – 1950; Honorary member of Phi Tau Sigma – 1953
- Scientific career
- Fields: Food science, microbiology
- Workplaces: Massachusetts Institute of Technology
- Doctoral advisor: William Thompson Sedgwick (see footnote)
- Doctoral students: Philip K. Bates, Samuel A. Goldblith, Bernard E. Proctor

Notes
- Prescott earned his S.B. in chemistry at MIT in 1894 and did not go up any further in his studies.

Samuel Cate Prescott (April 5, 1872 – March 19, 1962) was an American food scientist and microbiologist who was involved in the development of food safety, food science, public health, and industrial microbiology.

== Early life ==
Prescott was born in South Hampton, New Hampshire, the younger of two children. An older sister, Grace, later became a teacher in South Hampton, located near the Amesbury, Massachusetts area, located across the New Hampshire-Massachusetts state line. His formal education was in an ungraded schoolhouse in New Hampshire. During his fifteenth year, Prescott served as a "rod man" on a surveying crew to lay out the state line between eastern New Hampshire and Massachusetts.

In 1888, he enrolled at the Sanborn Seminary in Kingston, New Hampshire, becoming a member of the first graduating class in 1890 which consisted of three girls and two boys. The seminary was a preparatory school for the Massachusetts Institute of Technology (MIT, then known as Boston Tech). It was there he met Allyne L. Merrill, an 1885 MIT graduate who helped Prescott enroll there in the fall of 1890.

== Student days at MIT ==
Majoring in chemistry at MIT, Prescott had courses that had instructors such as James Mason Crafts in organic chemistry, Ellen Swallow Richards in sanitary chemistry, and William Thompson Sedgwick in bacteriology. Sedgwick would later become the first president of the Society of American Bacteriologists (SAB) in 1899–1901 (The SAB became the American Society for Microbiology in December 1960.).

Prescott graduated with a S.B. degree in chemistry in 1894 after he wrote his senior research thesis entitled "Salt as Nutrients for Bacteria". The thesis was 37 pages long and handwritten. With the help of Sedgwick, chair of the Biology department at MIT, Prescott found his first position as an assistant chemist and biologist at the sewage treatment facility in Worcester, Massachusetts, where he worked for the rest of 1894 and part of 1895.

== Return to MIT and canning research ==
In 1895, Prescott returned to MIT as an assistant to Sedgwick in the biology department and was promoted to instructor in 1896. During that time, William Lyman Underwood of the William Underwood Company, a food company founded in 1822 in Boston, Massachusetts, approached Sedgwick about product losses in his canned food product with swells and exploded cans despite the newest retort technology available. The only foreseeable option was to investigate for which Sedgwick detailed Prescott's assignment.

From late 1895 to late 1896, Prescott and Underwood worked on the problem every afternoon, specifically on canned clams, and discovered that the clams contained some heat-resistant bacterial spores that were able to survive the processing. Eventually, both men were able to determine that the clam's living environment also determined that if the bacteria was available and further found that the organisms could be killed if processed at 250 °F (121 °C) for ten minutes in a retort.

The processing time-temperature studies also led to research of processing time-temperature studies of canned lobster, sardines, peas, tomatoes, corn, and spinach. Prescott and Underwood's work was first published in late 1896 with follow-up papers done from 1897 to 1926 This research, though important to the growth of food technology, was never patented. It would also pave the way for thermal death time research that was pioneered by Bigelow and C. Olin Ball from 1921 to 1936.

== MIT teaching and research ==
While Prescott was doing his canning research, he also taught biology at MIT. This included courses in bacteriology, general biology, botany, genetics. He also rose through the ranks at MIT, moving to assistant professor in 1903 and associate professor in 1909 and even traveled through Europe during 1900, mainly Belgium, Germany, Denmark, Switzerland, and France, to assist in research per Sedgwick's request. Prescott published papers on water bacteriology, milk bacteriology, and public health bacteriology from 1895 to 1910.

His research would continue from 1910 to 1921 into banana fungal disease in Costa Rica in 1917 and 1918 that would lead to a disease-resistant banana. During World War I, Prescott also was commissioned a United States Army major in the Sanitary Commission of the army medical department regarding the dehydration of food supplied to soldiers on the front line during the war. Serving from 1917 to 1919, Prescott received an honorable discharge and would actively serve in the United States Army Reserve until 1936, where he retired at the rank of colonel.

== Rise to department head and Dean of Science at MIT ==
Prescott assumed the role of acting head of the Department of Biology and Public Health at MIT upon Sedgwick's death on January 25, 1921, and would be named department head on May 18, 1922. Prescott as department chair would change the focus from sanitary biology to industrial biology content with focus more on food technology, including recruiting more biochemistry and physiology faculty from 1922 and in later careers.

Student recruitment would also increase, including the recruitment of future food scientists such as Philip K. Bates, Samuel A. Goldblith, and Bernard E. Proctor from the 1920s until 1940. When MIT underwent a reorganization following President Samuel Wesley Stratton's death in 1931, the new president Karl Taylor Compton selected Prescott as the first dean of MIT's School of Science the following year, a role Prescott would serve until his retirement in 1942; in the meantime, he would continue his role as head of the Biology and Public Health Departments, including continuing his food technology research.

== Continuation of food technology research ==
Even while he was busy as department head and dean, Prescott continued working on research beneficial to the growth of food technology from 1921 to 1942. This would include research into coffee from 1923 to 1937 and would include future Nobel Laureate Robert Burns Woodward when Woodward was a graduate student at MIT. He also worked on research in citric acid fermentation, refrigerated and frozen foods, and was instrumental in starting a new scientific journal named Food Research in 1936 (Journal of Food Science since 1961). By this time, the need for a conference dealing with the growth of food technology and a possible society to be created was in process.

== Formation of the Institute of Food Technologists ==
As food technology grew from the individual family farm to the factory level, including the slaughterhouse for meat and poultry processing, the cannery for canned foods, and bakeries for bread as examples, the need to have personnel trained for the food industries. Literature such as Upton Sinclair's The Jungle in 1906 about slaughterhouse operations would be a factor in the establishment of the U.S. Food and Drug Administration (FDA) later that year.

The United States Department of Agriculture was also interested in food technology and research was also being done at agricultural colleges in the United States, including MIT, the University of Illinois at Urbana-Champaign, the University of Wisconsin–Madison, and the University of California, Berkeley.

By 1935, both Prescott and Proctor (now on the MIT faculty) decided that it was time to hold an international conference regarding this. A detailed proposal was presented to MIT President Compton in 1936 was presented with $1500 of financial aid from MIT for a meeting to be held from June 30 – July 2, 1937, with Compton asking how many people would be in attendance at this meeting. Prescott replied with "fifty or sixty people." 500 people actually attended the event.

This meeting proved so successful that in early 1938 that a second conference would be held in 1939. Initially led by George J. Hucker of the New York State Agricultural Experiment Station (part of Cornell University) in Geneva, New York, a small group meeting was held on August 5, 1938, on forming an organization with an expanded group meeting in New York City on January 16, 1939, to further discuss this. The second conference was held at MIT June 29 to July 1, 1939, with Proctor as conference chair. 600 people attended this event.

At the final session, the chairman of the session Fred C. Blanck of the United States Department of Agriculture, proposed that an organization be established as the Institute of Food Technologists. This was approved unanimously. Its first officers were Prescott as president, Roy C. Newton of Swift & Company in Chicago, Illinois, as vice president, and Hucker as secretary-treasurer. By 1949, IFT had 3,000 members. Prescott was chosen as the first president because of his previous positions as presidents of two other professional organizations: the Society of American Bacteriologists in 1919 and the American Public Health Association in 1927–1928

== Post-MIT career ==
Following his 1942 retirement, Prescott remained a busy man even becoming acting dean during 1944 when the current dean George Russell Harrison, a physicist, was called on assignment to Australia. He also assisted during World War II in a ration survey per the United States Army, monitoring its history from 1789 to 1912 in three different time periods as part of the U.S. Army Quartermaster Corps, and even worked as a special consultant to the quartermaster corps regarding food. Prescott also wrote about the early history of MIT in a book published by the MIT Press in Cambridge, Massachusetts, in 1954 entitled When M.I.T. was "Boston Tech" (1861–1916). He also remained active in IFT, both on the national level and in the Northeast Section (Maine, Massachusetts, New Hampshire, Rhode Island, and Vermont) until his death in 1962.

== Death and legacy ==
Prescott died on March 19, 1962, shortly after suffering a stroke at 89. Prior to his death in 1961, the Underwood Canning Company dedicated a new laboratory wing of their facility in honor of Prescott and Underwood. After Prescott's 1962 passing, the Underwood company established the Underwood Prescott Memorial Lectureship that ran until 1982 when the Underwood Company was sold.

The Institute of Food Technologists established the Samuel Cate Prescott Award in 1964 to honor young researchers in food science and technology for those who are under 36 years of age or who are a maximum ten years after earning their highest degree whichever is later. An Underwood Professorship was established in 1969 with an Underwood-Prescott Professorship followed up in 1972. Three MIT faculty have held this professorship since its inception: Samuel A. Goldblith, Gerald N. Wogan, and since 1996, Steven R. Tannenbaum.

== Honors and awards ==
All honors are at this reference unless noted.

- MIT Class of 1894 Secretary
- Fellow – American Academy of Arts and Sciences (Year not listed)
- President – Society of American Bacteriologists (1919) (now American Society for Microbiology). Also was charter member
- President – Institute of Food Technologists (1939–41). Charter member and the only person to every serve as president more than one year.
- IFT Nicholas Appert Award (1943)
- IFT Stephen M. Babcock Award (1951)
- Samuel Cate Prescott Award created (1964)
- Honorary ScD – Bates College (1923)
- Honorary ScD – Lehigh University (1947)
- Honorary Charter Member of Phi Tau Sigma, the honorary society of food science (1953).

== Personal life ==
Prescott married Alice Chase (1884–1958) in June 1910 and remained married until her 1958 death. They had three children, Robert Sedgwick Prescott (1911-?), Samuel Chase Prescott (1912–1976), and Eleanor Prescott Clemence (1914-?) He also was an active writer both of technical textbooks, and of poetry. Prescott even wrote an award-winning essay for the Massachusetts Registry of Motor Vehicles on "Can Children Be Saved from Death by Motor Cars" in the late 1920s.
