= Thermal death time =

Amount of time that it takes to kill a bacteria via heat

Thermal death time is how long it takes to kill a specific bacterium at a specific temperature. It was originally developed for food canning and has found applications in cosmetics, producing salmonella-free feeds for animals (e.g. poultry) and pharmaceuticals.

== History ==
In 1895, William Lyman Underwood of the Underwood Canning Company, a food company founded in 1822 at Boston, Massachusetts and later relocated to Watertown, Massachusetts, approached William Thompson Sedgwick, chair of the biology department at the Massachusetts Institute of Technology, about losses his company was suffering due to swollen and burst cans despite the newest retort technology available. Sedgwick gave his assistant, Samuel Cate Prescott, a detailed assignment on what needed to be done. Prescott and Underwood worked on the problem every afternoon from late 1895 to late 1896, focusing on canned clams. They first discovered that the clams contained heat-resistant bacterial spores that were able to survive the processing; then that these spores' presence depended on the clams' living environment; and finally that these spores would be killed if processed at 250 ˚F (121 ˚C) for ten minutes in a retort.

These studies prompted the similar research of canned lobster, sardines, peas, tomatoes, corn, and spinach. Prescott and Underwood's work was first published in late 1896, with further papers appearing from 1897 to 1926. This research, though important to the growth of food technology, was never patented. It would pave the way for thermal death time research that was pioneered by W. D. Bigelow and C. Olin Ball from 1921 to 1936 at the National Canners Association (NCA).

Bigelow and Ball's research focused on the thermal death time of Clostridium botulinum (C. botulinum) that was determined in the early 1920s. Research continued with inoculated canning pack studies that were published by the NCA in 1968.

== Mathematical formulas ==
Thermal death time can be determined one of two ways: 1) by using graphs or 2) by using mathematical formulas.

=== Graphical method ===
This is usually expressed in minutes at the temperature of 250 °F (121 °C). This is designated as F_{0}. Each 18 °F or 10 °C change results in a time change by a factor of 10. This would be shown either as F^{10}_{121} = 10 minutes (Celsius) or F^{18}_{250} = 10 minutes (Fahrenheit).

A lethal ratio (L) is also a sterilizing effect at 1 minute at other temperatures with (T).

$$L = 10^{(T - T_\mathrm{Ref})/z}$$

where T_{Ref} is the reference temperature, usually 250 °F (121 °C); z is the z-value, and T is the slowest heat point of the product temperature.

=== Formula method ===
Prior to the advent of computers, this was plotted on semilogarithmic paper though it can also be done on spreadsheet programs. The time would be shown on the x-axis while the temperature would be shown on the y-axis. This simple heating curve can also determine the lag factor (j) and the slope (f_{h}). It also measures the product temperature rather than the can temperature.

$$j = {jI \over I}$$

where I = RT (Retort Temperature) − IT (Initial Temperature) and where j is constant for a given product.

It is also determined in the equation shown below:

$$\log g = \log jI - {B_B \over f_h}$$

where g is the number of degrees below the retort temperature on a simple heating curve at the end of the heating period, B_{B} is the time in minutes from the beginning of the process to the end of the heating period, and f_{h} is the time in minutes required for the straight-line portion of the heating curve plotted semilogarithmically on paper or a computer spreadsheet to pass through a log cycle.

A broken heating curve is also used in this method when dealing with different products in the same process such as chicken noodle soup in having to dealing with the meat and the noodles having different cooking times as an example. It is more complex than the simple heating curve for processing.

== Applications ==
In the food industry, it is important to reduce the number of microbes in products to ensure proper food safety. This is usually done by thermal processing and finding ways to reduce the number of bacteria in the product. Time-temperature measurements of bacterial reduction is determined by a D-value, meaning how long it would take to reduce the bacterial population by 90% or one log_{10} at a given temperature. This D-value reference (D_{R}) point is 250 °F (121 °C).

z or z-value is used to determine the time values with different D-values at different temperatures with its equation shown below:

$$z = \frac{T_2 - T_1}{\log D_1 - \log D_2}$$

where T is temperature in °F or °C.

This D-value is affected by pH of the product where low pH has faster D values on various foods. The D-value at an unknown temperature can be calculated knowing the D-value at a given temperature provided the Z-value is known.

The target of reduction in canning is the 12-D reduction of C. botulinum, which means that processing time will reduce the amount of this bacteria by a factor of 10^{12}. The D_{R} for C. botulinum is 0.21 minute (12.6 seconds). A 12-D reduction will take 2.52 minutes (151 seconds).

This is taught in university courses in food science and microbiology and is applicable to cosmetic and pharmaceutical manufacturing.

In 2001, the Purdue University Computer Integrated Food Manufacturing Center and Pilot Plant put Ball's formula online for use.
