= William Underwood Company =

American food company

- Current Underwood logo
- Industry: Food
- Founded: 1822
- Founder: William Underwood
- Defunct: 1982
- Fate: Acquired
- Area served: USA
- Parent: B&G Foods
- Website: underwoodspreads.com

The William Underwood Company, founded in 1822, was an American food company best known for its flagship product Underwood Deviled Ham, a canned meat spread. The company had a key role in time-temperature canning sterilisation research done at the Massachusetts Institute of Technology (MIT) from 1895 to 1896, which led to the development of food science and food technology as a profession.

== History ==
=== Canned foods ===
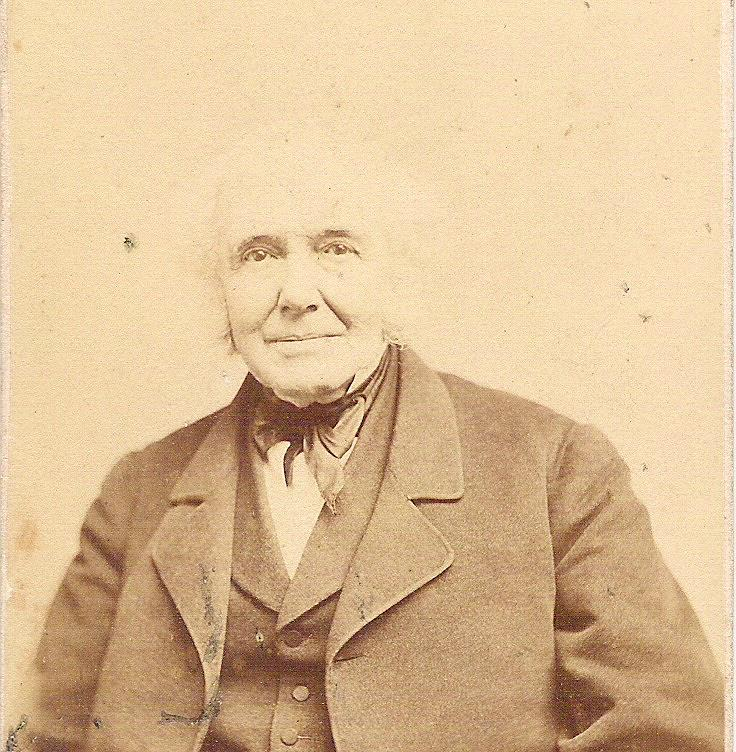
William Underwood (1787–1864).

Before moving to the United States, William Underwood (1787–1864) worked as an apprentice at Mackey & Company in London, bottling food and exporting it to South America. He moved to the United States in 1817, arriving at New Orleans. According to family legend he walked from New Orleans to Boston.

The William Underwood Company of Boston was established by Underwood in 1822 in Boston, Massachusetts, as a condiment company using glass packing techniques. Among the condiments and other items glass packed were mustard, ketchup of various kinds, many types of pickled vegetables, and cranberries, primarily focusing on mustard and pickling. In 1836, Underwood shifted from glass to steel cans, coated with tin on the inside, because glassmakers in the Boston area could not keep up with product demands from the canning company. The company shipped its products to South America, the West Indies and in Asia. In 1839, the bookkeepers of the William Underwood Company standardized the use of the word 'can' instead of 'tin canister'.

Underwood's canned foods proved valuable to settlers during the Manifest Destiny period of 1840–60. Later, Underwood sold canned foods to Union troops during the American Civil War of 1861–65. The number of canned products increased to include seafood products, such as lobster, oyster, and mackerel. William Underwood died in 1864, the same year that William Lyman Underwood, one of his three grandsons, was born. Underwood's son, William James Underwood, headed the business, as new retort technology was developed for use. In 1880, Underwood opened the first sardine factory in Jonesport, Maine, known as one of the largest sardine factories in the world.

In 1896, the William Underwood Company started to export its spread ham to Venezuela, leading to the creation of the brand 'Diablitos Underwood deviled ham' in 1960 by General Mills. In 1906, the Massachusetts Board of Health banned all deviled meats, except Underwood's, from sale in Massachusetts. The National Billposters' Association, based in Chicago, center of America's meat packing industry at the time, then banned its members from posting bills with devil images on them. In 1907, a shipment of Underwood canned goods was denied entry on the territory by the Argentinian customs because small traces of boric acid were found in the canned foods.

=== Research with MIT ===
From its beginning, the company encountered the problem of cans swelling, causing a great deal of product loss. In late 1895, William Lyman Underwood, a grandson of the founder, approached William Thompson Sedgwick, the chair of the biology department at MIT about the concerns he had with product swells and the explosion of cans of clams. Sedgwick conferred with his assistant, Samuel Cate Prescott, and from late 1895 to late 1896, Prescott and Underwood worked on the problem every afternoon, focusing on canned clams. They discovered that the clams contained heat-resistant bacterial spores that were able to survive the processing. They learned that these spores' presence depended on the clams' living environment, and that these spores would be killed if processed at 250 °F (121 °C) for 10 minutes in a retort.

These studies prompted similar research of canned lobster, sardines, peas, tomatoes, corn, and spinach. Prescott and Underwood's work was first published in late 1897. This research, which was never patented, proved beneficial to the William Underwood Company, the canning industry, the food industry, and food technology itself.

In the mid-1950s, outgoing company president W. Durant brought new president George Seybolt to MIT to meet Prescott. At the Institute of Food Technologists Northeast Section (Maine, Massachusetts, New Hampshire, Rhode Island, and Vermont) meeting at Watertown, Massachusetts, in April 1961, the William Underwood Company dedicated a new laboratory in honor of both Prescott and William Lyman Underwood.

Following Prescott's death in 1962, the William Underwood Company created the Underwood Prescott Memorial Lectureship in memory of both Underwood and Prescott. This Lectureship ran until 1982. In 1969, Seybolt donated $600,000 (equivalent to $5,268,000 in 2025) to MIT to create the Underwood Professorship, followed up with an Underwood Prescott Professorship in 1972. Three MIT faculty have held this professorship since its inception: Samuel A. Goldblith, Gerald N. Wogan, and since 1996, Steven R. Tannenbaum.

=== Expansion in 1960s ===
Underwood acquired the Appert label in 1964, and the Burnham & Morrill (B&M) Company of Portland, Maine, in 1965. B&M had purchased canned clams and tomatoes from Underwood in the late 1860s for resale, before producing these products on its own. Baked beans were the best known product that B&M produced, which it began doing in the 1920s with its Brick Oven Baked Beans. Piermont Foods, a food company in Montreal, Canada, was acquired in 1968 in order for Underwood to sell its products north of the border. In 1974, Underwood acquired the canned goods producer Shippam's.

=== Sale to PET ===
Underwood, which up to this point had been privately owned by the Underwood family, was sold to Pet, Inc., in 1982. B&M Foods was included as part of the sale, and the Underwood headquarters building in Westwood, Massachusetts, was closed as a result. In 1995, the Pillsbury Company acquired Pet, Inc., and began a modernization process that included warehousing, production, and processing. In 1999, New York's B&G Foods acquired the Underwood foods business, including the line of Underwood's canned meat spreads, sardines, B&M products, and Ac'cent flavor enhancer.

== Deviled ham and devil logo ==
Underwood first canned deviled ham in 1868, as a mixture of ground ham with various seasonings. Deviling was done with other meat and seafood products, including turkey, chicken, tongue and lobster. "Deviling" consists of adding spices such as pepper sauce, cayenne pepper, Dijon mustard, or chopped chili peppers. Deviled eggs are one well-known example of this process. The devil logo was trademarked in 1870. The company claims that it is the oldest food trademark still in use in the United States. The red devil that debuted in 1895 and started as a demonic figure evolved into a much friendlier version when compared to the original.

The older version, in use during the first half of the 20th century, can be seen in many old magazine advertisements, such as one from Woman's Home Companion, August 1921. It lacks the pitchfork and smile of the modern version, and has long fingernails or claws not found in the modern version. The barbed tail is in the shape of the letter W, and along with the lower-case M to the right of the devil forms the abbreviation "Wm.", for William, as in William Underwood. The opening scene in William Faulkner's 1938 short story "Barn Burning" makes reference to the original logo.

The lettering in the logo and on the can spout small flames, reinforcing the spicy devil concept. In 2008, B&G Foods updated the devil logo by adding color to the previously all-red image. The pitchfork became black, and small amounts of yellow were added in the tail and horns, along with shading to add depth. The yellow in the tail and horns was later removed. The devil logo has appeared on Underwood products that are not deviled, as part of the overall brand identity, such as sardines, liverwurst, corned beef and chicken spreads and chicken breast. In the 1980s, an animated version of the devil logo was created for TV advertising.

Other companies have sold deviled ham products. In 1900, at least seven other companies produced their own versions of deviled ham, among them Armour and Company and Libby's.

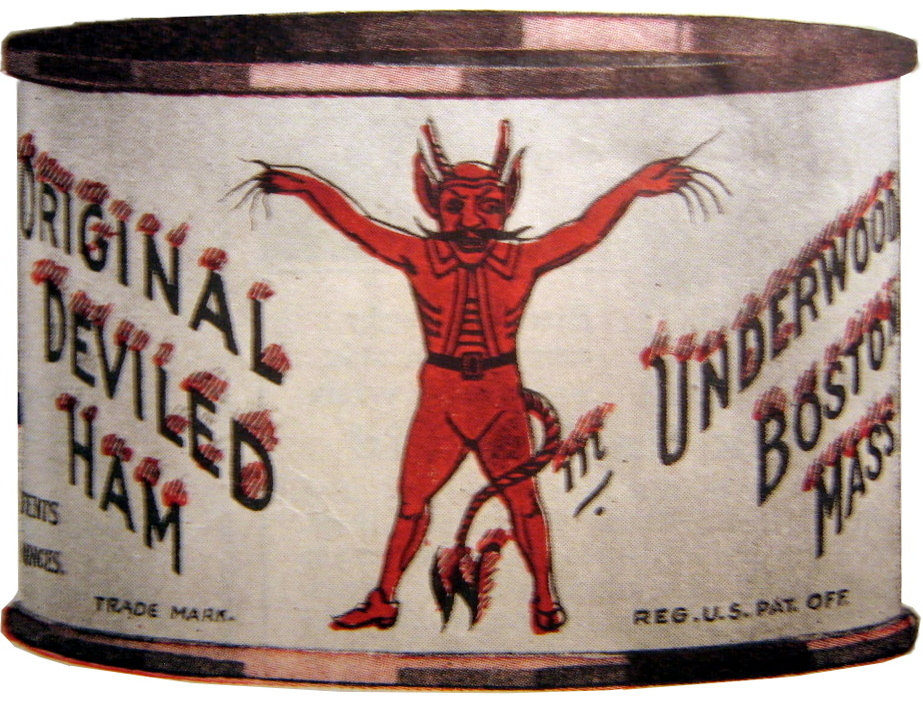
A can of Underwood Deviled Ham, 1921.

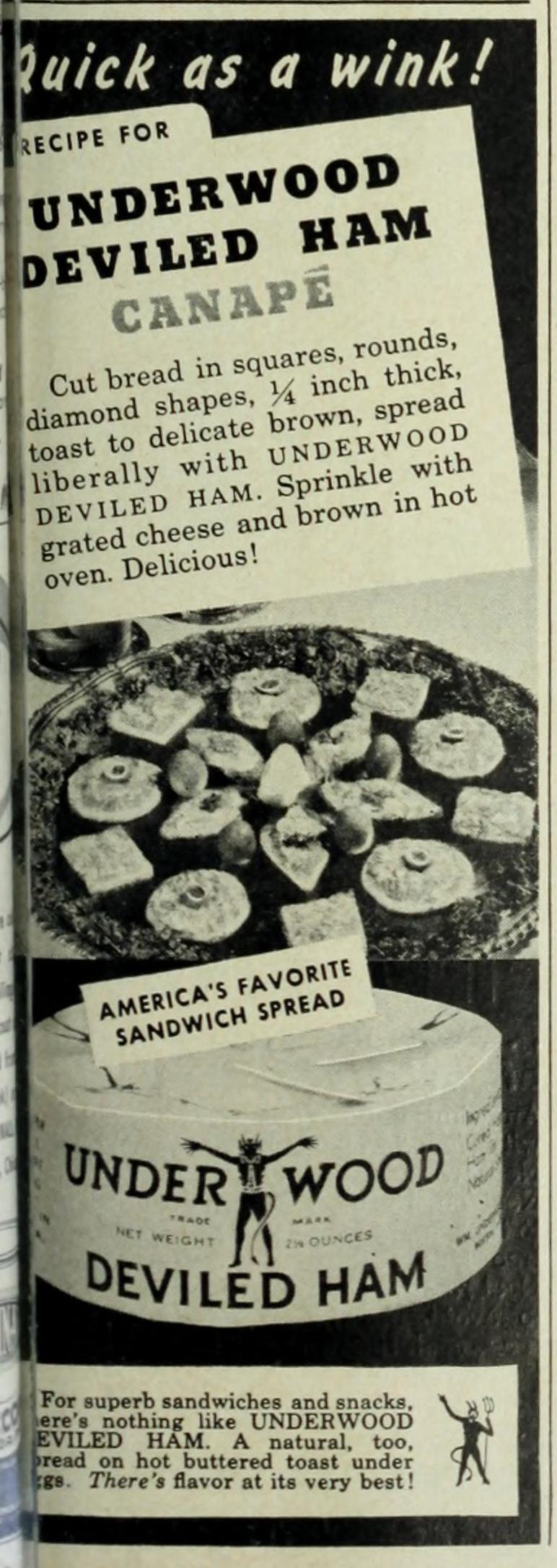
Advertising in the Ladies' Home Journal, 1948.

A can of Underwood Chicken Spread.

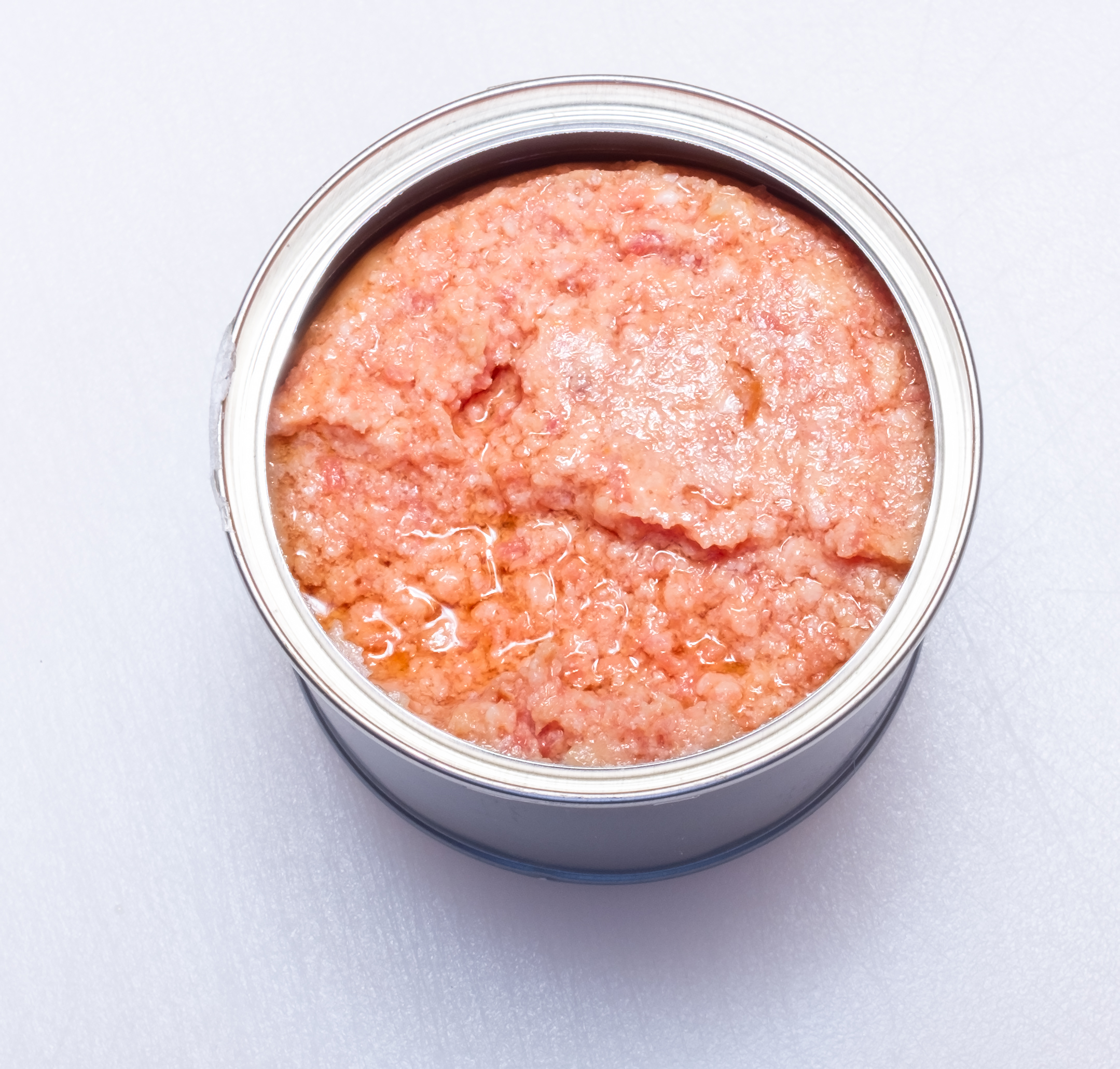
Underwood Deviled Ham, 2019.

== See also ==
- Deviled egg
- Deviled crab
- Devilled kidneys
- B&G Foods

== Works cited ==
- Goldblith, S. A. (1993). Samuel Cate Prescott - M.I.T. Dean and Pioneer Food Technologist. Pioneers in Food Science. Vol. 1. Trumball, CT: Food and Nutrition Press. ISBN 0917678338.
- Shaw, F. H. (1957). The history of the William Underwood Company, 1821-1954 (PhD thesis). Harvard University. HU 90.7263, film 6209.
