= Susan Lynn Hefle =

American food scientist (1959–2006)

Susan Lynn Hefle (October 23, 1959 – August 30, 2006) was an American food scientist who specialized in food allergens, specifically their detection and safety. Hefle was also a cyclist and a cyclist judge.

== Early life ==
Hefle was born in Milwaukee, WI. Hefle's father was Louis Hefle. Hefle's mother was Nancy (née Woods) Hefle.

== Education ==
Hefle earned all three of her degrees at the University of Wisconsin–Madison (B.S. - Microbiology, M.S. - Food safety, and Ph.D. - Food toxicology/immunology/allergy), then did her post-doctoral work in the allergy section at the University of Wisconsin School of Medicine and Public Health.

== Career ==
=== Food Allergy Research ===
In 1995, Hefle became a Research Assistant Professor of Food Science and Technology at the University of Nebraska–Lincoln. Hefle was a researcher and co-director of the Food Allergy Research and Resource Program (FARRP). Hefle performed research and extension to the food industry. Hefle was an expert on food allergies and food allergens. In 1999, in response to protesters of genetically altered food, Hefle noted that there is no evidence that genetically modified foods have caused spikes in allergies.

Hefle developed and validated ELISA tests for many allergens. ELISA is an acronym for Enzyme-Linked ImmunoSorbent Assays.

Hefle earned two patents for analytical methods on aflatoxin detection and her research led to the development of commercial enzyme-linked immunosorbent assays (ELISA) for detecting any residual allergen foods that could contaminate other foods and created ELISAs for detecting peanut, egg, almond, walnut, and milk products. Hefle authored or co-authored over 130 peer-reviewed publications and earned two patents as a result of her efforts.

Hefle was active in several professional organizations. Hefle received the Institute of Food Technologists (IFT) Samuel Cate Prescott Award in 2000. In 2004, Hefle was named an IFT Fellow.

In 1999, Hefle was given the University of Nebraska's Institute of Agricultural and Natural Resources Dinsdale Family Faculty Award and earned the Marie Kelso Speaker Award from the candy and confectionery industries. Hefle also was named fellow of the American Academy of Allergy, Asthma, and Immunology in 2003.

As a member of IFT, Hefle was active in leadership role in the organization's Biotechnology, and Toxicology & Safety Evaluation divisions, was a Scientific Lecturer, a member of the Biotechnology Issues Task Force, and a Council Representative to the IFT Executive Committee.

== Cycling ==
Hefle was an avid cycling rider and racer, competing since the early 1990s in road and track cycling events. Becoming a cycling judge in 1991, she advanced to the rank of national commissaire in 2006. Hefle was one of only 19 women to ever attain this honor in the United States and one of only 50 overall to do so. The United States has a total of 1500 cycling officials in this country as of 2006. In the mid-1990s, she founded American Bicycle Racing (ABR) in Tinley Park, Illinois in order to bring out more grass roots cycling and support to junior and master-level riders that USA Cycling was neglecting. Hefle worked as its technical director until her death in 2006.

== Personal life ==
On August 30, 2006, Hefle died of cancer in Lincoln, Nebraska, U.S. She was 46 years old. A memorial was held in her honor in Lincoln, Nebraska, on September 14, 2006. IFT had an "In Memoriam" article on her in their October 2006 Food Technology magazine. An additional tribute was done to her in the October/ November 2006 issue of Food Safety magazine. The Toxicology & Safety Evaluation Division of IFT has their student division competition named in her honor, a tradition that started in 2007.

== Additional sources ==
- "Division Competition Winners: Toxiciology & Safety Evaluation Div. (Susan L. Hefle)" Food Technology. August 2009. p. 48.
- "In Memoriam: Susan "Sue" Lynn Hefle." Food Safety magazine. October/November 2006. p. 8.
- "In Memoriam: Susan L. Hefle." Food Technology. October 2006. p. 81.
