= James L. Oblinger =

American academic administrator

13th Chancellor of North Carolina State University
- Preceded by: Marye Anne Fox
- Succeeded by: Randy Woodson

Personal details
- Born: 1945 (age 80–81) Ashland, OH

James L. Oblinger is an American academic administrator who was the 13th Chancellor of North Carolina State University. He served in this position from 2004, after the resignation of Chancellor Marye Anne Fox, until his resignation on June 8, 2009, amid increased public and media scrutiny surrounding the hiring and compensation of Mary P. Easley, wife of former Governor Mike Easley and the severance package provided for former provost Larry Nielsen.

== Early life ==
Oblinger was born in 1945 in Ashland, Ohio. He earned a Bachelor's in bacteriology from DePauw University, and a Master's and Ph.D. from Iowa State University in Food Technology.

== Career ==
During the early years of Oblinger's career, he served at the University of Missouri as Associate Dean & Director of Resident Instruction, College of Agriculture and at the University of Florida as Professor of Food Science and Human Nutrition.

He received the Institute of Food Technologists' William V. Cruess Award in 1983.

== North Carolina State University ==
The position Oblinger first held at N.C. State was as the Associate Dean of Academic Programs in the College of Agriculture and Life Sciences. He later became Dean. He is also a professor in the Department of Food Science (College of Agriculture and Life Sciences). Other positions at NC State include:

- Provost & Executive Vice-Chancellor for Academic Affairs
- Dean, College of Agriculture and Life Sciences
- Associate Dean & Director of Academic Programs, College of Agriculture and Life Sciences.

In 2005, following the resignation of Chancellor Marye Anne Fox, the NC State Board of Trustees announced Oblinger as the thirteenth chancellor of NC State. Oblinger resigned from the chancellorship in June 2009.

== Personal life ==
Oblinger is married to Diana G. Oblinger. They have four sons, who have all attended NC State.

== Sources ==
- Office of the Chancellor, Biography
