= Bernard E. Proctor =

American food scientist (1901–1959)

Bernard E. Proctor (May 5, 1901 – September 24, 1959) was an American food scientist who was involved in early research on food irradiation.

== Early life ==
A native of Malden, Massachusetts, Proctor graduated from Malden High in 1919, then graduated with an S.B. at the Massachusetts Institute of Technology (MIT) in 1923. He would then earn his Ph.D. at MIT in 1927.

== MIT career ==
After earning his Ph.D. in 1927 from MIT, Proctor went to work as an instructor in the biology and public health department at the institute. Proctor would be appointed to assistant professor of food technology in 1930, associate professor in 1937, professor in 1944, and department chair in 1952. Proctor would serve as chair until his sudden death in his office on September 24, 1959.

During his career at MIT, Proctor worked on the application of food irradiation with Samuel A. Goldblith and Daniel F. Farkas, both of whom were graduate students under Proctor at MIT. Goldblith would later work with Proctor on the MIT faculty until Proctor's 1959 death. Proctor and his boss at MIT, Samuel Cate Prescott, would also publish the first book on food science in 1937 entitled Food Technology, published by McGraw-Hill. Proctor also served as director of Subsistence Research of the U.S. Army Quartermaster Corps in Washington, DC during World War II.

== Formation of the Institute of Food Technologists ==
As food technology grew from the individual family farm to the factory level, including the slaughterhouse for meat and poultry processing, the cannery for canned foods, and bakeries for bread as examples, the need to have personnel trained for the food industries. Literature such as Upton Sinclair's The Jungle in 1906 about slaughterhouse operations would be a factor in the establishment of the U.S. Food and Drug Administration (FDA) later that year. The United States Department of Agriculture was also interested in food technology and research was also being done at agricultural colleges in the United States, including MIT, the University of Illinois at Urbana-Champaign, the University of Wisconsin–Madison, and the University of California, Berkeley. By 1935, both Prescott and Proctor decided that it was time to hold an international conference regarding this. A detailed proposal was presented to MIT President Compton in 1936 was presented with $1500 of financial aid from MIT for a meeting to be held from June 30 to July 2, 1937, with Compton asking how many people would be in attendance at this meeting. Prescott replied with "fifty or sixty people." 500 people actually attended the event.

This meeting proved so successful that in early 1938 that a second conference would be held in 1939. Initially led by George J. Hucker of the New York State Agricultural Experiment Station (part of Cornell University) in Geneva, New York, a small group meeting was held on August 5, 1938, on forming an organization with an expanded group meeting in New York City on January 16, 1939, to further discuss this. The second conference was held at MIT June 29 to July 1, 1939, with Proctor as conference chair. 600 people attended this event. At the final session, the chairman of the session Fred C. Blanck of the United States Department of Agriculture, proposed that an organization be established as the Institute of Food Technologists. This was approved unanimously. Its first officers were Prescott as president, Roy C. Newton of Swift & Company in Chicago, Illinois as vice president, and Hucker as Secretary-Treasurer. By 1949, IFT had 3,000 members. Proctor was one of the charter members of IFT, serving as president in 1952–3. He would also win the Nicholas Appert Award in 1956 and would play a major role in the IFT Committee on Education's 1958 Allerton House conference in Monticello, Illinois that would lead to the first IFT undergraduate education standards in 1966.

== Death and legacy ==
Proctor died in his office in 1959. He was survived by his wife, the former Miriam H. Patten. Led by Farkas, the IFT Food Engineering Division would create the Bernard E. Proctor Lectureship which was first held in 1996, but has been held in odd-numbered years since 1999. In even-numbered years since 2000, the Proctor Lectureship has been held in conjunction with the Marcel Loncin Research Prize.

== Selected works ==
- Goldblith, S.A., B.E. Proctor, J.R. Hogness, and W.H. Langham (1949). "The Effect of Cathode Rays Produced at 3000 Kilovolts on Niacin Tagged with C^{14}." Journal of Biological Chemistry. 179(3):1163-1167.
- Prescott, S.E. and B.E. Proctor (1937). Food Technology. New York: McGraw-Hill Book Company.
