= Nicolas Appert Award =

Food technology award

The Nicolas Appert Award is awarded by the Chicago Section of the Institute of Food Technologists for preeminence in and contributions to the field of food technology. The award has been given annually since 1942 and is named after Nicolas Appert, the French inventor of airtight food preservation. Award winners receive a bronze medal with a front view of Appert and a $5000 honorarium. This is considered one of the highest honors in food technology.

== Winners ==
Source: IFT

Year	Winner
1942	William Vere Cruess
1943	Samuel C. Prescott
1944	Charles Albert Browne, Jr.
1945	A.W. Bitting
1946	C.H. Bailey
1947	C. Olin Ball
1948	C.A. Elvenhjem
1949	Roy C. Newton
1950	Thomas M. Rector
1951	A.E. Stevenson
1952	Edward M. Chace
1953	Victor M. Conquest
1954	Charles N. Frey
1955	Charles Glen King
1956	Bernard E. Proctor
1957	Emil M. Mrak
1958	William F. Geddes
1959	Berton S. Clark
1960	Ernest H. Wiegand
1961	Helmut C. Diehl
1962	Arnold Kent Balls
1963	Karl F. Meyer
1964	Gail M. Dack
1965	Harold W. Schultz
1966	Maynard A. Joslyn
1967	Michael J. Copley
1968	Donald K. Tressler
1969	Edwin M. Foster

Year	Winner
1970	Samuel A. Goldblith
1971	Reid T. Milner
1972	John C. Ayres
1973	Hans Linweaver
1974	George F. Stewart
1975	Ernest J. Briskey
1976	Amihud Kramer
1977	Richard L. Hall
1978	Jasper G. Woodroof
1979	Frederick J. Francis
1980	Evan C. Binkerd
1981	Bernard S. Schweigert
1982	Clinton O. Chichester
1983	Stephen S. Chang
1984	John J. Powers
1985	Alina S. Szczesniak
1986	Marcus Karel
1987	Elmer H. Marth
1988	Owen R. Fennema
1989	Fergus M. Clydesdale
1990	Myron Solberg
1991	Raymond J. Moshy
1992	Irving J. Pflug
1993	Wilbur A. Gould
1994	Roy L. Whistler
1995	Philip E. Nelson
1996	Michael P. Doyle
1997	H.C. Rudolph Heiss

Year	Winner
1998	Theodore P. Labuza
1999	Robert G. Cassens
2000	Aaron L. Brody
2001	Adolph (Al) S. Clausi
2002	Daniel F. Farkas
2003	Dietrich Knorr
2004	Larry R. Beuchat
2005	Gustavo V. Barbosa-Cánovas
2006	George E. Inglett
2007	Todd R. Klaenhammer
2008	Gilbert A. Leveille
2009	Daryl B. Lund
2010	R. Paul Singh
2011	Dr. Malcolm Bourne
2012	Casimir Akoh
2013	Kenneth R. Swartzel
2014	C. Patrick Dunne
2015	Stephen Taylor
2016	E. Allen Foegeding
2017	Jozef L. Kokini
2018	Dennis R. Heldman
2019	D. Julian McClements
2020	José Miguel Aguilera
