= Louise Slade =

Food scientist (1946–2021)

- Born: October 26, 1946; Florence, South Carolina
- Died: October 7, 2021
- Other name: Louise Slade Gennis
- Education: Columbia University
- Scientific career
- Thesis: Double-headed protease inhibitors from black-eyed peas (1974)

Louise Slade was a food scientist known for her work on food polymer science. She was an elected fellow of the Institute of Food Technologists and of the American Association of Cereal Chemists.

== Education and career ==
Slade was born in South Carolina in 1946 and was a dancer who briefly attended the Juilliard School. She moved on to Barnard College, first interested in botany but dissuaded by the low level of available funding so she instead studied biochemistry, and received her bachelor's degree in 1968. She went on to earn a Ph.D. from Columbia University in 1974, and subsequently was a postdoc at the University of Illinois at Urbana-Champaign where she was an NIH-funded postdoctoral fellow working with Gregorio Weber. She started working at General Foods as a scientist in 1979. She retired from Kraft Foods in 2006, and in 2018 she became affiliated with the Monell Chemical Senses Center in Philadelphia.

== Research ==
Slade is known for her work establishing the use of polymer science to the study processes in food, a field she called "food polymer science". Much of her work was a collaborative effort with Harry Levine, who was also her life partner. They started working together at General Foods where her focus had been frozen dough and his expertise was in frozen desserts. Their first paper "A Food Polymer Science Approach to the Practice of Cryostabilization Technology" set the stage for using polymer science to understand how food would respond to time and changes in temperature, especially with a focus on the role of water within the food. Her work allowed foods such as ice cream that is soft enough to eat, flavors stored in small beads, stabilized wheat for biscuits that are stored for long periods of time, cookies with low moisture content, baked chips that taste as if they have been fried, and a reduced calorie flour replacement. Over the course of her career, Slade filed 47 patents, which she estimated earned her employers more than $1 billion.

== Awards and honors ==
From the Institute of Food Technologists, she and Harry Levine received the Industrial Scientist Award in 1999 and she was elected a fellow in 2016. Slade has also received multiple honors from the American Association of Cereal Chemists (AACC, now called the Cereal & Grains Association), including receiving the Halverson Award from the Milling and Baking Division in 2007, and receiving the 2008 Applied Research Award whereby she was also elected a fellow of the organization. In 2019, Slade presented the Alsberg-French-Schoch Memorial Lectureship at the Cereal & Grain Association's annual meeting.

In 2006, a group at Washington State University established strain of wheat which they called it Triticum aestivum 'Louise' to honor Slade and her niece, Kriquet 'Louise' Kidwell.

In 2018, a three-day symposium entitled "Water in Foods Symposium in Honor of Louise Slade and Harry Levine" was held at the American Chemical Society Annual meeting.

== Publications ==
- Levine, Harry; Slade, Louise, eds. (1991). Water relationships in foods : advances in the 1980s and trends for the 1990s. New York: Plenum Press. ISBN 978-0306439360.
- Slade, Louise; Levine, Harry (1 January 1995). "Glass Transitions and Water-Food Structure Interactions". Advances in Food and Nutrition Research. 38. Academic Press: 103–269. doi:10.1016/s1043-4526(08)60084-4. ISBN 9780120164387. PMID 15918292.
- Slade, Louise; Levine, Harry; Reid, David S. (1 January 1991). "Beyond water activity: Recent advances based on an alternative approach to the assessment of food quality and safety". Critical Reviews in Food Science and Nutrition. 30 (2–3): 115–360. doi:10.1080/10408399109527543. ISSN 1040-8398. PMID 1854434.
- Levine, Harry; Slade, Louise (1 January 1986). "A polymer physico-chemical approach to the study of commercial starch hydrolysis products (SHPs)". Carbohydrate Polymers. 6 (3): 213–244. doi:10.1016/0144-8617(86)90021-4. ISSN 0144-8617.
- Slade, Louise; Levine, Harry (1 January 1988). "Non-equilibrium melting of native granular starch: Part I. Temperature location of the glass transition associated with gelatinization of A-type cereal starches". Carbohydrate Polymers. 8 (3): 183–208. doi:10.1016/0144-8617(88)90002-1. ISSN 0144-8617.
