= Barbara Keenan =

Barbara Keenan may refer to:

- Barbara Milano Keenan (born 1950), United States circuit judge
- Barbara Byrd Keenan, American businesswoman
