= Gustavo V. Barbosa-Cánovas =

Uruguayan-American academic

Gustavo V. Barbosa-Cánovas is an Uruguayan American professor of food engineering and director of the Center for Nonthermal Processing of Food at Washington State University. Barbosa-Cánovas worked for the University of Puerto Rico as an assistant professor between 1985 and 1990, during which he was granted two National Science Foundation (NSF) awards for research productivity. Next, he joined Washington State University (WSU) where he is now a professor of food engineering and director of the Center for Nonthermal Processing of Food (CNPF). He is also a guest professor at the college of food science and nutrition engineering, China Agricultural University and visiting professor at Tecnologico de Monterrey, Mexico.

== Awards ==
- 1988 and 1989 National Science Foundation (NSF) Scientific Research Productivity Award
- 2001 International Award, Institute of Food Technologists
- 2005 Nicolas Appert Award
- 2005 Fellow of the Institute of Food Technologists, the Society for Food Science and Technology
- In 2010, he was awarded a Honoris Causa Doctorate at Universidad Politécnica de Cartagena, Spain.
- 2010 Sahlin Faculty Excellence Award for Research Scholarship and Arts, Washington State University.
- 2016 International Food Engineering Award by ASABE- American Society of Agricultural and Biological Engineers)
- 2017 Research and Development Award, Institute of Food Technologists
- 2019 IFT Nonthermal Processing Division Lifetime Achievement Award
- Government of Israel Fellowship, Ministry for Foreign Affairs
- Fulbright Scholarship for Master Studies in Food Engineering at University of Massachusetts

== Selected bibliography ==
- Balasubramaniam, V. M., Barbosa-Cánovas, G. V., & Lelieveld, H. L. 2016. High Pressure Processing of Food. Springer New York.
- García, M. P. M., Gómez-Guillén, M. C., López-Caballero, M. E., & Barbosa-Cánovas, G. V. (Eds.). 2016. Edible Films and Coatings: Fundamentals and Applications. CRC Press
- Ibarz, A. and Barbosa-Canovas, G.V. 2014. Introduction to Food Process Engineering. CRC Press.
- Zhang, H, Barbosa-Cánovas, Gustavo V., V.M. “Bala” Balasubramaniam, C.Patrick Dunne, Daniel Farkas, and James Yuan, eds 2011 Nonthermal Processing Technologies for Food. Chicago: IFT Press, Wiley-Blackwell
- Feng, Hao, Gustavo V. Barbosa-Cánovas, and Jochen Weiss, eds 2010 Ultrasound Technologies for Food and Bioprocessing. New York: Springer
- Barbosa-Cánovas, Gustavo V., Alan Mortimer, Dave Lineback, Walter Spiess, Ken Buckle, and Paul Colonna, eds. 2009. Global Issues in Food Science and Technology. USA: Academic Press, Elsevier.
- Barbosa-Cánovas, G.V., A. Fontana, S. Schmidt, and T. Labuza, eds. 2007. Water Activity in Foods: Fundamentals and Applications. Ames, Iowa: Blackwell Publishing Professional.
- Barbosa-Cánovas, G.V., ed. 2005. Food Engineering. Encyclopedia of Life Support Systems. Paris: UNESCO Publishing.
- Barbosa-Cánovas, G.V., E. Ortega-Rivas, P. Juliano, and H. Yan. 2005. Food Powders: Physical Properties, Processing and Functionality. New York: Springer
- Barbosa-Cánovas, G.V., Maria Tapia, and M. Pilar Cano, eds. 2005. Novel Food Processing Technologies. Boca Raton, FL: CRC Press.
- Welti-Chanes, J., G.V. Barbosa-Cánovas, and J.M. Aguilera, eds. 2002. Engineering and Foods for the 21st Century. Boca Raton, FL: CRC Press.
- Lozano, Jorge E.; Anon, Cristina; Barbosa-Canovas, Gustavo V.; Parada-Arias, Efren (2000). Trends in Food Engineering. CRC Press.
- Barbosa-Cánovas, G.V., and G.W. Gould, eds. 2000. Innovations in Food Processing. Lancaster, PA: Technomic Publishing Co., Inc.
- Barbosa-Cánovas, G.V., M.M. Góngora Nieto, U.R. Pothakamury, and B.G. Swanson. 1999. Preservation of Foods with Pulsed Electric Fields. San Diego, CA: Academic Press.
- Barbosa-Cánovas, G.V., U.R. Pothakamury, E. Palou and B.G. Swanson. 1997. Nonthermal Preservation of Foods. New York: Marcel Dekker.
- Fito, P., E. Ortega-Rodríguez and G.V. Barbosa-Cánovas, eds. 1997. Food Engineering 2000. New York: Chapman & Hall.
- Barbosa-Cánovas, G.V. and H. Vega-Mercado. 1996. Dehydration of Foods. New York: Chapman & Hall.
- Barbosa-Canovas, Gustavo V.; Ma, Li; Barletta, Blas J. (1997). Food Engineering Laboratory Manual. CRC Press.
