= IFT Industrial Scientist Award =

Food technology award

The IFT Industrial Scientist Award was awarded by the Institute of Food Technologists (IFT) for scientists who made significant technical contributions to advancing the food industry. It was first awarded in 1994, but was not necessarily awarded every year. In 2019, the IFT reorganized its awards program, and no longer offered this award.

Award winners received a USD 3000 honorarium and a plaque from IFT.

== Winners ==
Year	Winner
1994	Aaron L. Brody
1995	Gerhard J. Haas
1996	David P. Bone
1997	R.B. Sleeth
1998	Norman S. Singer
1999	Harry Levine & Louise Slade
2000	George E. Inglett
2001	Richard R. Perdue
2002	Laurence Bell
2003	Raymond A. Bourque
2004	Gilbert A. Leveille
2005	Mohan Rao
2006	Jairus R. David
2007–2008	Award not given
2009	Kyungsoo Woo
2010–2014	Award not given
2015	Pablo Coronel
2016	Chris Koh
2017–2019	Award not given
2020	John I. Haas Company
