= Alina Surmacka Szczesniak =

American food scientist

Alina Surmacka Szczesniak (July 8, 1925 – July 23, 2016) was a Polish-born American food scientist best known for her contributions to food texture.

== Education and career ==
She was the daughter of Wladysław Surmacki, who was to be President of the International Federation of Surveyors (FIG) in 1942 but did not survive the Second World War. In 2002, Szcześniak received the plaque of Honorary President of FIG on behalf of her father.

Szcześniak attended Bryn Mawr College as a foreign student after the Second World War, which she spent in her native Poland.

Szcześniak earned her graduate degree in food technology at the Massachusetts Institute of Technology, then worked for General Foods in the field of food chemistry, focusing on texture studies. She worked at General Foods from 1952 until her 1986 retirement, where she retired as a principal scientist.

Szcześniak developed the now-standard Sensory Texture Profile Analysis, which analyzes, quantifies and places in correct sequence all textural properties perceived from the moment a piece of food is placed in the mouth until the last particle is swallowed.

In 1969, Szcześniak was a founding editor of the Journal of Texture Studies and served for 10 years in that role.

== Awards and honours ==
In 1985, Szcześniak became the first woman to receive the Nicholas Appert Award, the highest honor bestowed upon its members by the Institute of Food Technologists (IFT). It commended her pioneering work on food texture that led to its recognition as an important quality attribute affecting consumer acceptance and to its organization as a subdiscipline of food science. She is the only woman thus far to ever win the Nicholas Appert Award. Dr Szcześniak was elected an IFT Fellow in 1981.
