= Yun-Hwa Peggy Hsieh =

- Education: Florida State University; Purdue University
- Occupation: Professor

Yun-Hwa Peggy Hsieh is a food scientist at Florida State University, where she serves as a professor in the Department of Nutrition Food and Exercise Sciences. Her laboratory has successfully characterized several heat-stable muscle proteins as the species marker antigens for development of monoclonal antibodies. These antibodies are used as a probe for the detection of meat origin in heat-processed products. This research is important not only to discourage the illegal practices of meat adulteration on the retail market for consumer protection but also to prevent the spread of mad cow disease. She is an elected fellow of the Institute of Food Technologists and the International Academy of Food Science & Technology. She received her doctorate from Florida State University.

Hsieh received her B.S. degree in Nutrition & Foods from Fu Jen University in Taiwan, M.S. degree in Animal Science from Purdue University, and Ph.D. in Food Science from Florida State University.
