= Myron Solberg =

American food scientist

Myron "Mike" Solberg (1930-July 28, 2001) was an American food scientist who was renowned for his collaboration with academia, government, and industry that better advanced food technology.

== Education ==
A native of Massachusetts, Solberg earned his B.S. degree at the University of Massachusetts Amherst in 1952. He then went on to earn his Ph.D. at the Massachusetts Institute of Technology in 1960. After earning his Ph.D., Solberg went to work in the meat industry before joining Rutgers University in 1964.

== Research career ==
Joining the food science department at Rutgers University in 1964, Solberg worked in meat science and food microbiology. In 1984, he created the Center for Advanced Food Technology (CAFT), a cooperative research venture among academia, government, and industry in food science and technology. He would chair the CAFT until his 2000 retirement. This was also part of his work with the United States Department of Agriculture (USDA) Cooperative State Research, Education, and Extension Service (CSREES) for which he would be honored by them in 1997.

== Memberships ==
- American Association for the Advancement of Science - Fellow.
- American Chemical Society - Fellow.
- American Council on Science and Health
- American Society for Microbiology
- American Society for Quality
- Institute of Food Technologists (IFT) - (Fellow: 1979, Nicholas Appert Award: 1990, Nominee for President: 1993, Carl R. Fellers Award: 2001)
- New Jersey Academy of Science
- New York Academy of Sciences

== Military service ==
Solberg also served in the United States Air Force Reserves, rising to the rank of Lieutenant Colonel before he retired in 1991.

== Death and legacy ==
Solberg died of cancer on July 28, 2001. In 2004, IFT created the Myron Solberg Award in honor of individuals who lead in establishing, successfully developing, and continuing a cooperative relationship among academia, government, and industry in food technology.
