= William Lyman Underwood =

American photographer and food scientist (1864–1929)

- Born: 1864; Boston, Massachusetts, U.S.
- Died: January 24, 1929 (aged 64–65)
- Known for: Canning and food science

William Lyman Underwood (1864 – January 24, 1929) was an American photographer who was also involved in the research of time-temperature canning research at the Massachusetts Institute of Technology (MIT) from 1895 to 1896.

== Biography ==
MIT Notable Events, 1895, in the Kendall/MIT subway stop, mentioning Underwood and Prescott.

A native of Boston, Massachusetts, Underwood was the second son of William James Underwood, one of the nine children of William Underwood, the founder of the William Underwood Company.

In late 1895, the William Underwood Company decided that they had had enough with tin cans that had "swells" in them, causing a great deal of product loss. This was a problem they had experienced since the company's founding in 1822. William Lyman decided late that year to visit MIT for assistance with this problem.

Underwood approached William Thompson Sedgwick, the chair of the biology department at MIT about the concerns he had with the recent product swells and explosion of clams. Sedgwick then summoned his assistant Samuel Cate Prescott and apprised him on the issue. From late 1895 to late 1896, Prescott and Underwood worked on the problem every afternoon, focusing on canned clams. They first discovered that the clams contained some heat-resistant bacterial spores that were able to survive the processing; then that these spores' presence depended on the clams' living environment; and finally that these spores would be killed if processed at 250˚F (121˚C) for ten minutes in a retort.

These studies prompted the similar research of canned lobster, sardines, peas, tomatoes, corn, and spinach. Prescott and Underwood's work was first published in late 1896, with further papers appearing from 1897 to 1926. This research, though important to the growth of food technology, was never patented.

During the research process, Underwood provided photomicrographic images of the bacteria that were involved in the research, which were magnified 650 times in 1896. A later research article in 1898 showed photography of bacteria magnified 1,000 times.

This research proved beneficial to the William Underwood Company, the canning industry, the food industry, and food technology itself. Underwood retired from the William Underwood Company in 1899 to devote himself entirely to bacteriology studies at MIT. He would work at MIT without pay. This research and friendship with Prescott would continue until Underwood's death in 1929.

== Death and legacy ==
In the late 1950s, the new president of the William Underwood Company, George Seybolt, was brought over by his predecessor, W. Durant, to MIT to meet Prescott (William Lyman Underwood had died in 1929). At the Institute of Food Technologists Northeast Section (Maine, Massachusetts, New Hampshire, Rhode Island, and Vermont) meeting at Watertown, Massachusetts, in April 1961, the William Underwood Company dedicated a new laboratory in honor of both Prescott and William Lyman Underwood. Following Prescott's death in 1962, the Company created the Underwood Prescott Memorial Lectureship in memory of both Underwood and Prescott. This Lectureship would run until 1982. In 1969, Seybolt donated US$600,000 to MIT to create the Underwood Professorship, followed up with an Underwood Prescott Professorship in 1972. Three MIT faculty have held this professorship since its inception: Samuel A. Goldblith, Gerald N. Wogan, and since 1996, Stephen R. Tannebaum.

Underwood was also a talented photographer. Besides images in microbiology, Underwood also photographed natural environment. His photographs were part of a book by John Burroughs as shown in the second and third external links listed below. One of Underwood's two brothers, Loring, was also an accomplished photographer as well.
