= Aaron L. Brody =

American scientist (1930–2021)

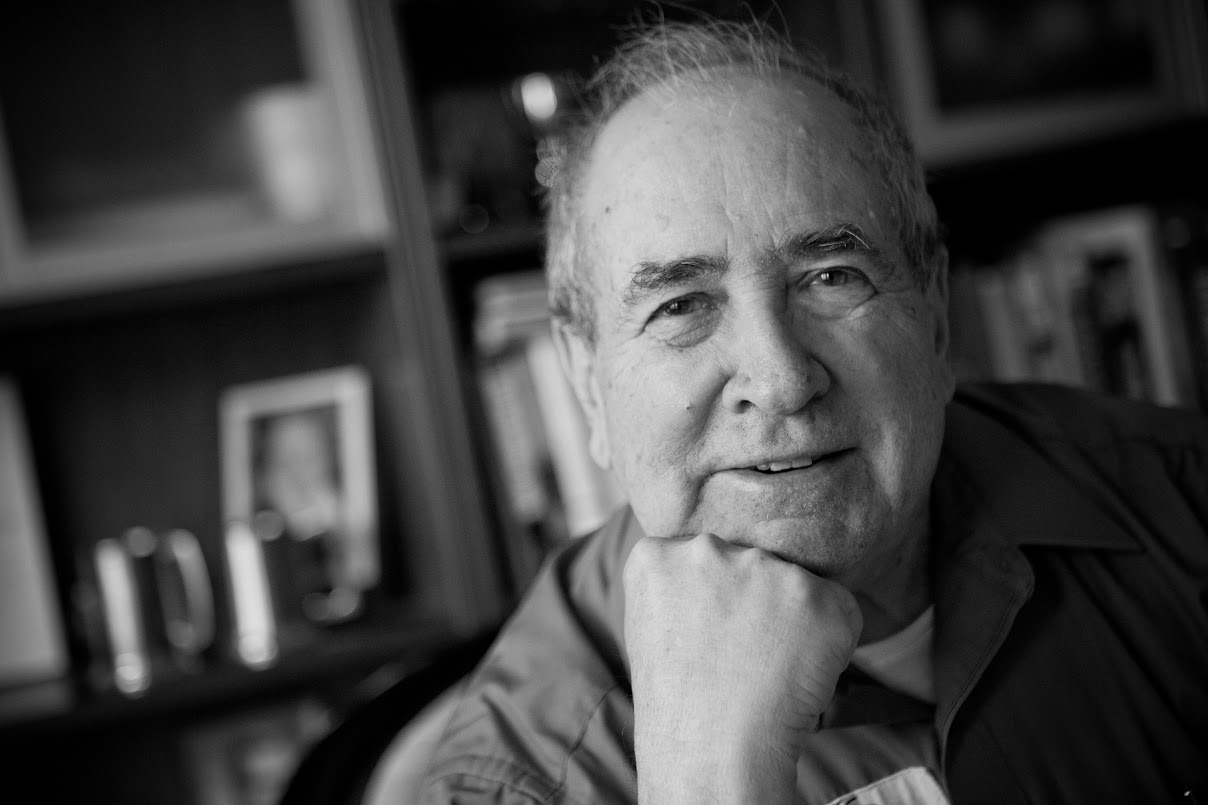
- Born: Aaron Leo Brody; August 23, 1930; Boston, Massachusetts, U.S.
- Died: July 26, 2021 (aged 90); Peachtree Corners, Georgia, US
- Education: Massachusetts Institute of Technology (B.S., Food Technology, 1951; Ph.D., Food Technology, 1957) Northeastern University (M.B.A.)
- Occupation: Food Scientist
- Known for: Food Packaging
- Spouse: Carolyn Goldstein (m. 1953; died 2021)
- Children: 3

Aaron Leo Brody (August 23, 1930 – July 26, 2021) was an American food scientist, who developed new technologies in food processing and packaging. He created the first frozen fish sticks in the 1950s. While working for Mars, Incorporated, he was also responsible for introducing Starburst to the United States. Later, Brody served as an adjunct professor at the University of Georgia.

== Biography ==
=== Early years ===
Aaron Leo Brody was born in Boston, Massachusetts, the elder of two children to Nathan Brozozek and Lillian Gorman, Jewish immigrants from Poland. Upon entry into America through Ellis Island, his father's name was Americanized to Brody. Aaron attended Solomon-Lewenburgh Junior High School and then Boston English School in 1947.

Brody entered Massachusetts Institute of Technology (MIT) in 1947, and earned a B.S. in Food Technology in 1951. He became an illustrator with contributions to the school newspaper where most of his work was pen on paper of sports figures. He was drafted into the Korean War and served from 1952 to 1954. He was based at Fort Pickett in Blackstone, Virginia where he was a newspaper correspondent reporting on the personal stories of wounded soldiers returning from the War.

After completing his military commitment, he entered the graduate program of the Food Packaging Department at MIT where he earned a Ph.D. in 1957. Brody studied under Bernard E. Proctor, an American food scientist involved in early research of food irradiation, and the MIT Food Technology Department Chair. Brody's "Masticatory Properties of Foods by the Strain Gage Denture Tenderometer", was one of the many contributions he made to the world of food technology. The invention was featured in Life (magazine) on October 29, 1956, and included a full page of pictures of the machine which was shown chewing a piece of mozzarella cheese. The device is on display at the MIT Museum. The mechanism allowed food manufacturers to control qualities in process and design future food products with specific properties. He later earned an M.B.A. from Northeastern University in 1970.

=== Career ===
Brody started his career, while in school, in food technology with the Birdseye Fisheries Lab Division of General Foods in 1951 as a team member in the development of the first frozen precooked foods including fish sticks. While a graduate student, he worked part-time for Raytheon Manufacturing Company where he was a member of a team that developed the first microwave oven, leading to microwave cooking, heating, and browning of foods. After he earned his graduate degree, Brody worked for the Whirlpool Corporation in Benton Harbor, Michigan. He led the development of modified atmosphere packaging (MAP), invented an odor control system for refrigerators, a thermoelectric refrigerator/freezer, the Total Environmental Control “Tectrol” controlled atmosphere process for food preservation, a progenitor of MAP fresh-cut vegetables, and radiation pasteurization of foods. While at Whirlpool, he invented and patented an apparatus and method of storing perishable animal and plant materials, as well as non-food materials.

He developed commercial confectionery products including Starburst, Nerds, and Pop Rocks while employed at M&M Candies Division of Mars, Inc. Brody's team adapted the British fruit flavored candy Opal Fruits into M&M Fruit Chewies before deciding to rename them Starburst due to the connotation of M&M's to chocolate. During his time with Mars, Inc. Dr. Brody was also charged with aesthetics and designed the white "M" that remains on the center of chocolate M&Ms. This required developing a substrate and technology for including text on confectionary items that was both safe to eat and could maintain its shape and color for long storage periods. Beyond confectioneries, Brody also led development of freeze dried food technology, which broadened the foods that were available in space exploration. At Mead Packaging, he invented the Crosscheck Aseptic Packaging System for high acid fluid food products used commercially for juices and sauces, receiving patents US4,152,464, US4,391,080, US4,409,775. At Container Corporation of America, he led the development of the Versaform insert injection molding system, and he was Marketing Development Manager, which was his last position in corporate America.

By the mid 1980s, Brody transitioned into an independent consultant and university professor. He has taught undergraduate and graduate food packaging and food product development and marketing courses at The University of Georgia, MBA strategic marketing and product development courses at Saint Joseph's University, and packaging courses at Michigan State University. Brody authored numerous articles and ten textbooks in food packaging and food technology, marketing, and packaging. He authored The Encyclopedia of Packaging Technology that covers technologies used to package consumer and industrial products across industries from food to automobiles, soft drinks to pharmaceuticals. He also authored Modified Atmosphere Packaging for Fresh-Cut Fruits and Vegetables that covers modern MAP technologies for fresh-cut fruits.

=== Family ===
Aaron Brody was born on August 23, 1930 in Boston, Massachusetts to Jewish-Polish immigrants. During childhood, he remained in the United States whilst many extended family members continue to reside in Eastern Europe. These family members were largely massacred amidst the Shoah in Extermination Camps such as Auschwitz Birkenau. A small number survived these camps til the end of the war and their stories were later documented by Director Steven Spielberg for the USC Shoah Foundation. He later married Carolyn Goldstein on April 11, 1953, and stayed married until her death in April 2021. They had three children. He died on July 26, 2021, of Congestive Heart Failure. He is survived by sons Stephen Brody, Glen Brody, & Robyn Brody as well as grandchildren Michelle Brody, Derek Brody, Camryn Brody, Skyler Brody, Dr. Natalia Brody M.D., & Dr. Pierce Brody M.D.

Despite humble origins as Jewish refugees fleeing the growing antisemitic movement in pre-war Eastern Europe, Dr. Brody's academic achievements and the notable influence of his family persists as follows-- Abe Goldstein carried the title of World Bantamweight Champion for Boxing and is often categorized as one of the best light-weight boxers of all time. His eldest son, Stephen Brody, completed education at Phillips Exeter and University of Pennsylvania. He later married Susan Hertzberg, a then stock trader for Goldman Sachs & Company in New York who had graduated magna cum laude from Harvard College prior to her and Mr. Brody receiving master's degrees in business from the Harvard Business School. She also spent a significant portion of her career working with Pharmaceutical Conglomerates such as Genentech. Her father is Arthur Hertzberg, prominent Jewish Conservative Rabbi, academic & scholar. During his life, he authored numerous texts and taught courses at Princeton, Rutgers, Columbia, Hebrew University, and Dartmouth. He also served the Bronfman Visiting Professor of the Humanities at New York University and was vice president of the World Jewish Congress. He engaged in the 1943 Rabbis' march, walked with Martin Luther King Jr. in both the 1963 March on Washington for Jobs and Freedom and the 1965 "Bloody Sunday", during the first of the Selma to Montgomery marches, at the height of the American civil rights movement. Hertzberg also served as an intermediary between the American Jewish community and Secretary of State Henry Kissinger. Hertzberg played a major role in significant issues faced by world Jewry community in the decades following World War II, including discussions with the Roman Catholic Church over the Vatican's refusal to release documents pertaining to Pius XII and meeting with Pope John Paul II during his visit to Jerusalem. Grandson Derek Brody is married to Serena Deutch, daughter of Theodore Eliot Deutch (/dɔɪtʃ/ DOYTCH; born May 7, 1966), an American lawyer and politician who served as the U.S. representative from Florida's 22nd congressional district from 2010 to 2022 and now Chief Executive Officer of the American Jewish Committee.

== Honors ==
In 1964, Brody was awarded the Industrial Achievement Award by the Institute of Food Technologists and the Leadership Award by the Packaging Institute. He was named Packaging Man of the Year in 1985 by the National Association of Packaging, Handling, and Logistics Engineers. The Institute of Food Technologists' Food Packaging Division gave Brody the highest industry award, the Riester-Davis Award for Lifetime Achievement in Food Packaging, in 1988. He was the first recipient of the Institute of Food Technologists' Industrial Scientist Award in 1994 for scientists who made technical contributions to advancing the food industry.

In 1995, Brody was inducted into the Packaging Hall of Fame. In 2000, he was awarded the Nicholas Appert Award by the Institute of Food Technologists in recognition of his lifetime contributions.

The Michigan State School of Packaging established the Annual Aaron Brody Distinguished Lecture In Food Packaging in perpetuity. This is an endowment that was created by family and friends of Aaron L. Brody and Carolyn Brody in recognition of Aaron's lifelong achievements in Food Packaging. The Food Packaging Division of the Institute of Food Technologist renamed the Riester-Davis Award to include Aaron Brody's name in 2015 and now called the Riester-Davis-Brody Award.

He has been quoted in The New York Times, and featured on National Public Radio and CNN news. One of his NPR interviews was titled, The Weird, Underappreciated World Of Plastic Packaging where he explains that plastic packaging has become an ingrained part of the food system. On CNN, he described how new plastics may keep soft drinks from falling flat.

== Books ==
- Developing New Food Products for a Changing Marketplace, Second Edition (2000, with John B. Lord). Boca Raton, FL. ISBN 9781566767781: CRC Press.
- Modified Atmosphere Packaging for Fresh-Cut Fruits and Vegetables (2011, with Hong Zhuang and Jung H. Han). Oxford, UK. ISBN 978-0-8138-1274-8: Wiley & Sons.
- The Wiley Encyclopedia of Packaging Technology (1997, with Kenneth S. Marsh). New York. ISBN 0-471-06397-5: Wiley & Sons.
- Active Packaging for Food Applications (2002, with Eugene R. Strupinsky and Lauri R. Kline). Boca Raton. ISBN 978-1-58716-045-5: CRC Press.
- Principles of Package Development (1993, with Roger C. Griffin, Jr. and Stanley Sacharow). Malababar, FL. ISBN 978-8-94464-811-3: Krieger Publishing Company.
