= William V. Cruess Award =

Award for excellence in teaching food science & technology

The William V. Cruess Award has been awarded every year since 1970. It is awarded for excellence in teaching in food science and technology and is the only award in which student members in the Institute of Food Technologists (IFT) can nominate. This award is named after William V. Cruess (1886-1968), a food science professor at the University of California, Berkeley and later at the University of California, Davis who was also the first ever IFT Award winner when he won the Nicholas Appert Award in 1942.

Award winners receive a bronze medal showing a side view of Cruess from the Northern California Section of IFT and a USD 3000 honorarium from the IFT office in Chicago, Illinois.

== Winners ==
| Year | Winner |
|---|---|
| 1970 | Marcus Karel |
| 1971 | Clifford A. Samuels |
| 1972 | Edward E. Burns |
| 1973 | John R. Whitaker |
| 1974 | Elizabeth F. Stier |
| 1975 | Charles M. Stine |
| 1976 | Fergus M. Clydesdale |
| 1977 | Rose Marie Pangborn |
| 1978 | Owen R. Fennema |
| 1979 | Theodore P. Labuza |
| 1980 | Roy G. Arnold |
| 1981 | Richard L. Merson |
| 1982 | John J. Powers |
| 1983 | James L. Oblinger |
| 1984 | C. Anthon Ernstrom |
| 1985 | Norman N. Potter |
| 1986 | John W. Erdman, Jr. |
| 1987 | J. Ian Gray |
| 1988 | Mark A. Ubersax |
| 1989 | Howard A. Morris |
| 1990 | James W. Berry |
| 1991 | Paul A. Lachance |
| 1992 | Daniel E. Carroll, Jr. |
| 1993 | Michael E. Mangino |
| 1994 | Peggy M. Foegeding |
| 1995 | John B. Allred |
| 1996 | Grady W. Chism III |
| 1997 | Faye M. Dong |
| 1998 | Richard W. Hartel |
| 1999 | Karen M. Schaich |
| 2000 | Richard D. Ludescher |
| 2001 | Shelly J. Schmidt |
| 2002 | S. Suzanne Nielsen |
| 2003 | John Rupnow |
| 2004 | Wayne T. Iwaoka |
| 2005 | Brian E. Farkas |
| 2006 | Robert L. Shewfelt |
| 2007 | Ronald E. Wrolstad |
| 2008 | Stephanie Doores |
| 2009 | Mukund Karwe |
| 2010 | E. Allen Foegeding |
| 2011 | Jeff Culbertson |
