= Daryl B. Lund =

American food scientist and engineer (born 1941)

- Born: 1941; California, United States
- Occupation(s): Food scientist, Food engineer
- Spouse: Dawn

Daryl Bert Lund (born 1941) is an American food scientist and engineer who has served in various leadership positions within the Institute of Food Technologists, including President in 1990–1991 and editor-in-chief of the Journal of Food Science from 2003-2012. Lund was named one of 26 innovators in Food Engineering magazine's 75th anniversary edition in September 2003.

== Early life and college ==
Born in California, but raised in Wisconsin, Lund attended the University of Wisconsin–Madison where he earned his B.S. in mathematics in 1963. While an undergraduate, Lund was a roommate with Tommy Thompson, who later became Governor of Wisconsin (1987–2001) and United States Secretary of Health and Human Services during the first term of George W. Bush (2001–2004). Lund stayed at Wisconsin, where he earned a M.S. in Dairy and Food Industries, and a Ph.D. in food science and chemical engineering.

== Academic career ==
After earning his Ph.D. in 1968, Lund rose through the ranks at Wisconsin's Department of Food Science, reaching the rank of department chair in 1984. His research included fouling in heat exchangers during processing, microwave-processing of foods, and food quality kinetics. Lund remained with Wisconsin until 1987 as department chair until he accepted a position at Rutgers University as its department chair.

In 1988, Lund moved to Rutgers University in New Brunswick, New Jersey to accept the position of chair of the Department of Food Science. Lund was promoted to Executive Dean of Agricultural and Natural Resources in December 1989 and served until July 1995. While serving as Dean, Lund streamlined administrative services, initiated a review of all undergraduate curriculum, and initiated a long-range planning for the New Jersey Agricultural Experiment Station.

In August 1995, Lund joined Cornell University in Ithaca, New York as Dean of Agricultural and Life Sciences. While at Cornell, he initiated long-range planning that helped the college survive a 20% reduction in staffing, increased state support of the New York State Agricultural Experiment Station, initiated a review of undergraduate curriculum that led to major changes within the organization, initiated support of distance learning, initiated involvement in genomics.

In January 2001, Lund was named Executive Director of the North Central Regional Association of State Agricultural Experiment Station Directors and Professor of Food Engineering in Food Science at UW–Madison. He acts as a facilitator of interstate collaborators on research and greater integration between research and extension in a twelve state area. During his career, Lund has written over 200 publications in scientific journals, 25 book chapters, co-authored a major textbook on physical methods of food preservation, and presented over 200 presentations. He also succeeded Owen R. Fennema as editor-in-chief of the Journal of Food Science on September 1, 2003, a position he held until 2012.

== Honors and awards ==
- Institute of Food Technologists (IFT) - Fellow (1980), IFT International Award (1995), Carl R. Fellers Award (2003), and Nicholas Appert Award (2009).
- American Society of Agricultural Engineers IAFIS-FPEI Food Engineering Award - 1987
- International Academy of Food Science and Technology - Fellow (Charter member: 1999).
- University of Wisconsin–Madison College of Agricultural and Life Sciences award on August 10, 2006 of 40 years of service to the university. This included the creation of a chair professorship in the Department of Food Science and the Food Science Excellence Fund.
- Ohio State University Food Science Harris Award Laureate in 2006.
- Institute of Food Science and Technology (United Kingdom) - Fellow.
