= Marcel Loncin =

Belgian-born French chemical engineer

Marcel Loncin (20 May 1920 – 1995) was a Belgian-born, French chemical engineer who was involved in food engineering throughout his career.

== Education ==
Loncin was one of the first food engineers worldwide who published in the growth of the profession during his career. He studied chemical engineering at Charleroi (Belgium) and food technology at Brussels, then obtained two Ph.D.s at Paris University in France.

== Work experience and research ==
Loncin was technical director of a brewery and dairy facility in Belgium from 1942 to 1950, then was a consultant for several food companies, including Unilever and Campbell Soup. He also was a professor at the Centre d'Enseignement et de Recherches des Industries Alimentaries (CERIA) in Brussels from 1942 to 1970. From 1961 until his 1995 passing, Loncin served as scientific advisor to the Ecole Nationale Superieure des Industries Alimentaires (ENSIA). He also served as chair of the food engineering department of Karlsruhe University in West Germany (now Germany) from 1972 his retirement where Loncin was Professor Emeritus. During his career, he authored over 250 papers in his career in several languages. Loncin's research activities included drying technology and emulsion technology in foods.

== Involvement with the Institute of Food Technologists ==
In 1993, Loncin worked with the Institute of Food Technologists (IFT) in Chicago, Illinois in the establishment of the Marcel Loncin Research Prize with the help of the IFT Foundation. This award is administered by the foundation and is awarded on even years since 1994, and is awarded to an IFT member who is a scientist or an engineer conducting basic chemistry, physics, and/or engineering research applied to food processing and food quality. This was first awarded at the 1994 Annual Meeting & Food Expo in Atlanta, Georgia with Werner Bauer of Nestle in Lausanne, Switzerland. Loncin was present at the IFT meeting to present the award to Bauer.

== Additional honors ==
Loncin was honored by Chevreul, Thenard, ICEF, and Mehlitz during his career.

== Bibliography ==
- Loncin, M. and R.L. Merson (1979). Food engineering, principles, and selected applications. New York: Academic Press. 494p. (in English, French, and Russian)
