= Dennis R. Heldman =

- Born: 1938 (age 87–88); Ohio, United States
- Occupations: Food scientist, Food engineer

Dennis R. Heldman (born 1938) is a food engineer. He served as president of the Institute of Food Technologists during 2006–2007.

== Early life and career ==
A native of Ohio, Heldman received B.S. (1960) and M.S. (1962) in Dairy Technology from Ohio State University, then earned his Ph.D in Agricultural engineering from Michigan State University in 1964.

== Career at Michigan State ==
Upon earning his Ph.D. at Michigan State, Heldman rose in rank from Assistant Professor (1965–68), to Associate Professor (1968–70) to Full Professor (1970–84). This included a stint as department chair from 1975 to 1979. A graduate student of his, R. Paul Singh, now a professor of Agricultural and Biological Engineering at the University of California, Davis, creates a series of food engineering instruction books with Heldman that have become the teaching tool for people involved in food processing since 1974.

== Move to industry ==
After leaving Michigan State in 1984, Heldman moved to Campbell's in Camden, New Jersey where he was Vice President for Process Research & Development until 1986. After that, he joined the National Food Processors Association in Washington, D.C. where he served in various positions until 1991. Heldman then worked for the Weinberg Group from 1991 to 1992 as a consultant to the food industries before returning to academia.

== Return to academia ==
In 1992, Heldman returned to the academic world as Professor of Food Engineering at the University of Missouri where he served in various research and leadership positions until 1998. He would then transfer his research from Missouri to Rutgers University in New Brunswick, New Jersey in 1998 and perform similar research activities in food engineering and food technology until he returned to industry in August 2004.

In 2012, Heldman returned to his Alma mater as the Dale A. Seiberling Endowed Professor of Food Engineering in the Department of Food Science at Ohio State University. His current research program focuses on process design to achieve maximum efficiency and optimum food quality including reducing food waste, improving clean-in-place (CIP) operations, and optimizing food freezing and frozen storage practices.

== Move to consulting ==
In late 2004, Heldman moved to California to start his own consulting firm, Heldman Associates. He relocated to Weston, Florida in 2006.

== Selected works ==
- Heldman, D.R. (2003). "Influence of freezing process parameters on frozen quality." Paper 72-2. Presented at the 2003 Institute of Food Technologists Annual Meeting in Chicago, Illinois. In 2003 IFT Annual Meeting Technical Program Book of Abstracts. Chicago: Institute of Food Technologists. p. 175.
- Heldman, D.R. (2002). "The evolution of food engineering course content for food science students." Paper 95-1. Presented at the 2002 Institute of Food Technologists in Anaheim, California. In 2002 IFT Annual Meeting Technical Program Book of Abstracts. Chicago: Institute of Food Technologists. p. 234.
- Heldman, Dennis R., Ed. (2003). Encyclopedia of Agricultural, Food, and Biological Engineering. New York: Marcel Dekker, Inc.
- Heldman, Dennis R. and R. Paul Singh. (1981). Food Process Engineering Second Edition. New York: AVI/ Van Nostrand Reinhold.

== Awards ==
- American Society of Agricultural Engineers (ASAE) FIEI (now New Holland) Young Researcher Award – 1974
- American Society of Agricultural Engineers IAFIS-FPEI Food Engineering Award – 1981
- Fellow: American Society of Agricultural Engineers – 1984, Institute of Food Technologists – 1981, International Academy of Food Science and Technology – 2006.
- Two distinguished alumni awards from Ohio State University (1978, 1984).
- Institute of Food Technologists (IFT) Nicholas Appert Award – 2018

== Other memberships ==
Besides ASAE and IFT, Heldman is also member of the American Association of Cereal Chemists, the American Institute of Chemical Engineers, and the International Association for Food Protection among others.
