= Comprehensive Reviews in Food Science and Food Safety =

- Discipline: Food science
- Language: English
- Edited by: Mary Ellen Camire

Publication details
- History: 2002–present
- Publisher: Wiley-Blackwell on behalf of the Institute of Food Technologists
- Frequency: Bimonthly
- Impact factor: 12.811 (2020)

Standard abbreviations
- ISO 4: Compr. Rev. Food Sci. Food Saf.

Indexing
- CODEN: CRFSBJ
- ISSN: 1541-4337
- LCCN: 2002214625
- OCLC no.: 50419025

Links
- Journal homepage

Comprehensive Reviews in Food Science and Food Safety is an online peer-reviewed scientific journal published by the Institute of Food Technologists (Chicago, Illinois) that was established in 2002. Its main focus is food science and food safety. This includes nutrition, genetics, food microbiology, food chemistry, history, and food engineering.

== Editors ==
Its first editor was David R. Lineback (University of Maryland, College Park), who held the position from 2002 to 2004. From 2004 to 2006, R. Paul Singh (University of California, Davis) served as editor. The journal was edited by Manfred Kroger (Pennsylvania State University) from 2006 to 2018. Mary Ellen Camire (University of Maine, Orono) has been the editor since 2018.

== Abstracting and indexing ==
The journal is indexed and abstracted in the following bibliographic databases:

- CAB Abstracts
- Compendex
- Food Science & Technology Abstracts
- INSPEC
- MEDLINE
- Science Citation Index Expanded
- Scopus
- Veterinary Science Database

== See also ==
- Food safety
