= The Journal of Food Science Education =

- Language: English

Publication details
- History: 2002-present
- Publisher: Institute of Food Technologists (United States)
- ISO 4: Find out here

The Journal of Food Science Education was an online peer-reviewed scientific journal published by the Institute of Food Technologists (Chicago, Illinois). It was established in 2002 as the first scientific electronic journal of the Institute that was published online only. Its main focus was the education methods involved in food science and technology. This involved the recruitment of future food scientists, education at the undergraduate and postgraduate levels, and continuing education through distance learning, e-learning, and lifelong learning.

The January 2007 issue featured the first themed issue with improved food science education in the K-12 grade range (Kindergarten, primary, middle school, and secondary).

== Editors ==
Wayne T. Iwaoka was the inaugural scientific editor and served from 2000 to 2005. Grady W. Chism III served as scientific editor from 2006 to 2013 and Shelly J. Schmidt was scientific editor from 2014 to 2021.
