= Myron Solberg Award =

The Myron Solberg Award has been awarded every year since 2004 by the Institute of Food Technologists (IFT). It is awarded for leadership in establishing, successfully developing, and continuing a cooperative organization involving academia, government, and industry. The award is named for Myron Solberg (1930-2001), a food science professor at Rutgers University who founded the institution Center for Advanced Food Technology in 1984 and headed the center until his 2000 retirement.

Award winners received a USD 3000 honorarium and a plaque from the Myron Solberg Endowment Fund of the IFT Foundation.

== Winners ==
Year	Winner
2004	W. Steven Otwell
2005	C. Patrick Dunne
2006	Richard H. Linton
2007	John B. Luchansky
2008	Ken Swartzel
2009	George J. Flick, Jr.
2010	Award not given
