= Charles J. Bates =

American food scientist (1930–2006)

Charles J. Bates (May 4, 1930 – September 28, 2006) was an American food scientist who was involved in the development of baking formulas for angel food and devil's food cake, then later developed high fructose corn syrup sweetener for Coca-Cola. Away from his research, Bates was also involved with the Boy Scouts of America in Indiana, earning numerous awards.

== Early life ==
Born in Dayton, Ohio, Bates moved to Massachusetts and California where he would enroll at the California Institute of Technology, graduating with his B.S. there in 1951. Bates would then enroll at the Massachusetts Institute of Technology (MIT) where he would earn his Ph.D. in food technology in 1957.

== Research career ==
After earning his Ph.D. from MIT, Bates went to work at Procter & Gamble in Cincinnati, Ohio, where he developed formulas for cake mixes of angel food and devil's food cakes as part of the Duncan Hines brand during the 1960s. In 1972, Bates moved to Hammond, Indiana, where he worked for American Maize Company (now Cargill). While there, Bates developed high fructose corn syrup sweetener for Coca-Cola in their soft drinks. He would retire from American Maize in 1993 as Vice President-Technical.

== Professional activities involvement ==
Bates was an active member of the American Association of Cereal Chemists (AACC), serving on their Board of directors in 1991. His main activity though was focused on the Institute of Food Technologists (IFT) where he joined in 1951 as a student. While a graduate student at MIT in 1954, Bates was a student member on IFT's National Education Committee, then worked on their Committee on Divisions in 1963. He represented IFT on the executive committee during 1981–84, then served as IFT President in 1985–86, and later as IFT Treasurer in 1989–90. Additionally, Bates served as Chair of IFT's Chicago section in 1983–84. For his service, Bates would be named an IFT Fellow in 1988 and receive the Calvert L. Willey Award in 1998. His father, Philip Sr. (1902–93) was IFT President in 1954–55, making them the only father-son combination to ever hold the IFT Presidency.

== Boy Scouts of America involvement ==
Bates served for many years with the Boy Scouts of America (B.S.A.) as a volunteer in the Calumet Council B.S.A. of Munster, Indiana. This included Cubmaster, Scoutmaster, Council Commissioner of the council, and chairman of physical arrangements of the National Scout Jamboree 1997–2005. He would be awarded the Silver Beaver Award, Silver Antelope Award, the Heroism Award, and the James E. West fellow in 1996.

== Family and church activities ==
Bates was married to Nancy for fifty years before her death in 2004. He also had two sons (Charles Jr. and Richard L.), one daughter (Priscillia (Penny) Crosland), two grandsons, one granddaughter, two brothers Philip K. Bates Jr. and Bradford, and numerous nieces and nephews as well. Bates also served as an elder of the First Presbyterian Church of Crown Point, Indiana, and sang in the choir.

== Death and memorial ==
Bates died on September 28, 2006, in Crown Point, Indiana. Memorials were listed in the November 2006 issue of Food Technology, the IFT Chicago section, and in the Calumet Council B.S.A. November/ December 2006 newsletter. A celebration of life service was held at the First Presbyterian Church in Crown Point on November 25, 2006.
