= Samuel Cate Prescott Award =

Award

The Samuel Cate Prescott Award has been awarded since 1964 by the Institute of Food Technologists (IFT) in Chicago, Illinois. It is awarded to food science or technology researchers who are under 36 years of age or who earned their highest degree within ten years before July 1 of the year the award is presented. This award is named for Samuel Cate Prescott (1872-1962), a food science professor from the Massachusetts Institute of Technology who was also the first president of IFT.

Award winners receive a plaque from IFT and a USD 3,000 honorarium.

== Winners ==
Year	Winner
1964	Edgar Allan Day
1965	Ernest J. Briskey
1966	Award not given
1967	Robert G. Cassens
1968	Herbert O. Hultin
1969	Harry Y. Yamamoto
1970	Steven R. Tannenbaum
1971	Darrel E. Goll
1972	Theodore P. Labuza
1973	Norman F. Haard
1974	Thomas W. Keenan
1975	Anthony J. Sinskey
1976	Lowell D. Satterlee
1977	Larry R. Beuchat
1978	James M. Flink
1979	Award not given
1980	John W. Erdman, Jr.
1981	Paul A. Carroad
1982	R. Paul Singh
1983	Jesse F. Gregory III
1984	Henry K. Leung
1985	Barbara O. Schneeman
1986	Jozef L. Kokini
1987	Michael P. Doyle
1988	James J. Pestka
1989	Todd R. Klaenhammer
1990	Carl A. Batt
1991	Michael J. McCarthy
1992	Shelly J. Schmidt
1993	Award not given
1994	James L. Steele
1995	Marc C. Hendrickx
1996	Kathryn L. McCarthy
1997	Eric A. Decker
1998	Casimir C. Akoh
1999	D. Julian McClements
2000	Susan L. Hefle
2001	Q. Howard Zhang
2002	Kathryn Boor
2003	Martin Wiedmann
2004	Sheryl A. Barringer
2005	Maryanne Drake
2006	Dong-Hyun Kang
2007	Jochen Weiss
2008	F. Xavier Malcata
2009	Manuel Castillo
2010	Mario Ferruzzi
