= Charles S. Lawrence =

- Born: December 22, 1892; Guyton, Georgia
- Died: June 12, 1970 (aged 77); Romney, West Virginia
- Burial place: Arlington National Cemetery
- Military career
- Allegiance: United States of America
- Branch: United States Army
- Service years: 1915-48
- Rank: Lieutenant Colonel
- Unit: United States Army Quartermaster Corps
- Conflicts: World War I World War II; *Battle of the Philippines; *Battle of Bataan; *Bataan Death March
- Awards: Legion of Merit; Bronze Star (OLC); Purple Heart (Oak Leaf Cluster); Mexican Border Service Medal; World War I Victory Medal; Asiatic Pacific Campaign Medal; World War II Victory Medal; American Defense of the Pacific Medal
- Other work: Executive Secretary (now Executive Vice President) - Institute of Food Technologists (1949–61)

Charles S. Lawrence (December 22, 1892 – June 12, 1970) was a United States Army colonel who would survive the Bataan Death March to later become the first Executive Vice President of the Institute of Food Technologists (IFT).

== Early life and career ==
A native of Guyton, Georgia, Lawrence enlisted in the United States Army in 1915 where he served for 33 years, including both World War I and World War II.

== Assignment to the Philippines ==
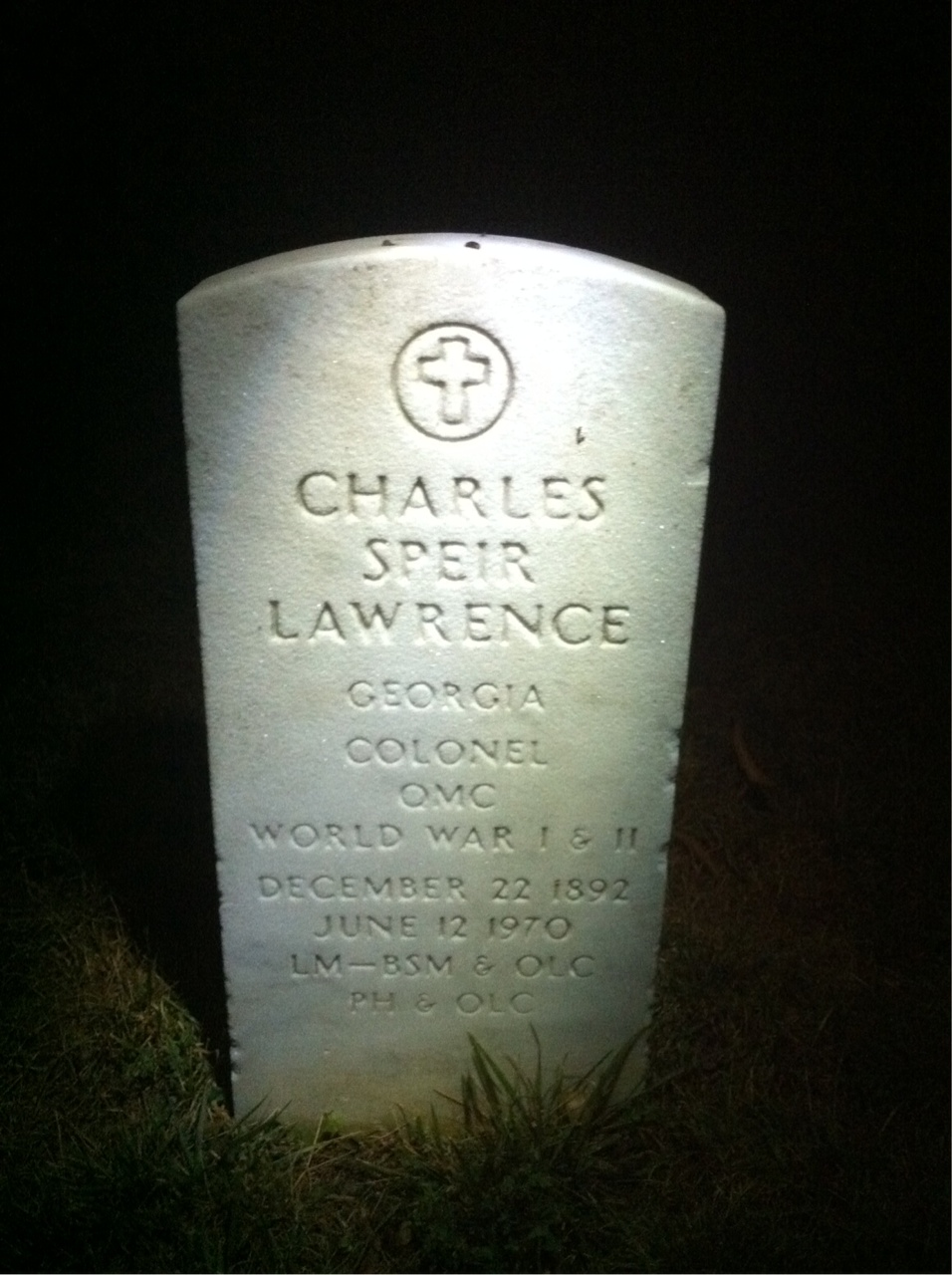
Grave at Arlington National Cemetery

By the start of World War II, Lawrence was a lieutenant-colonel in the United States Army Quartermaster Corps serving in the Philippines when Japan invaded the country on December 22, 1941, as part of the Asian nation's Pacific conquests, now known as the Battle of the Philippines. During this time, the quartermasters (including Lawrence) attempted to purchase as much food as possible to outlast the invaders, but were stopped by their own commanding generals. This accounted for losses of 10 million pounds of rice as a result in one instance. In Lawrence's case at Tarlac where he served as depot commander, he had planned on seizing about 2,000 cases of canned food, mostly fish and corned beef, and a large amount of clothing from Japanese firms stationed in the Philippines, but was refused by General Douglas MacArthur's headquarters claiming that Lawrence had no right to confiscate these items. In fact, MacArthur's staff threatened the lieutenant-colonel with court martial if he attempted to take those supplies. The supplies were not taken as a result and were later destroyed during the Battle of Bataan.

== World War II ==
During the battle, food supplies became so scarce that soldiers became hunters in an effort to stay alive. Even though American and Filipino forces would be victorious in early battles, they could not hold on and Bataan fell on April 8, 1942. Lawrence was among the 15,000 Americans who surrendered with 60,000 Filipinos and were forced into the Bataan Death March. He survived the march and would spend the rest of the war as a prisoner of war.

Lawrence was discharged from the US Army in 1948 after the end of World War II. He would earn the Legion of Merit, the Bronze Star with Oak Leaf Cluster, the Purple Heart with Oak Leaf Cluster, the Mexican Border Service Medal, the World War I Victory Medal, the Asiatic Pacific Campaign Medal, the World War II Victory Medal, and the American Defense of the Pacific medal.

== Institute of Food Technologists service ==
After retirement from the Army, Lawrence agreed to become the first Executive Secretary (now Executive Vice President) of the Institute of Food Technologists (IFT) in 1949. He took over the secretary's role from Carl R. Fellers, head of the food technology department at the University of Massachusetts Amherst and moved the national offices to its present location in Chicago. Lawrence's tenure as Executive Secretary would see IFT grow from 3,000 members in 1949 to 6,000 members at the time of his retirement from the IFT in 1961.

== Post-IFT activities ==
Following IFT, Lawrence served as advisor to the president of the National Florasynth Laboratory in Chicago until he retired for good in 1963. He and his wife then moved to Romney, West Virginia, where he lived until his death in 1970. He is buried in Arlington National Cemetery.
