= John J. Powers (food scientist) =

American food scientist (1918–2014)

- Born: John Joseph Powers; February 2, 1918; Pittsfield, Massachusetts
- Died: December 23, 2014 (aged 96); Athens, Georgia
- Education: University of Massachusetts Amherst
- Scientific career
- Fields: Food Science
- Workplaces: University of Georgia

John Joseph Powers (February 2, 1918 – December 23, 2014) was an American food scientist who was involved in the creation of the Food Science Department at University of Georgia in Athens, GA. He also served as President of the Institute of Food Technologists (IFT) in 1986-87 and was Editor of the Journal of Food Science and Journal of Food Quality.

== Early life and career ==
Powers was born on February 2, 1918 in Pittsfield, Massachusetts. He attended Massachusetts Agricultural College (aka Massachusetts State College, now known as UMass - Amherst) for undergraduate with a BS in Chemistry leading to a PhD in Food Technology. Noteworthy, his was the first PhD in this modern field of Food Technology/Science, different than Horticultural Manufactures of that era.

He studied under the pioneers of Food Science, Dr Carl R Fellers and Professor Walter W Chenoweth (Pioneers in Food Science Vol#2, 2004)

== Career at UGA ==
In 1947, Dr. Powers began his career at UGA and remained with UGA until his retirement in 1987. He served as department head between 1952 and 1967. He was also instrumental in developing the early curriculum, the departmental graduate program and recruiting students. Dr. Powers served as head of the Department of Food Science at the University of Georgia from 1952 to 1967. He returned to his job as a professor and in 1979 he was appointed the William Terrell Distinguished Professor of Food Science. The chair is the oldest endowed chair in the Agricultural Sciences in the United States, having been established in 1854. Dr. Powers organized Master's level and Ph.D. courses in 1948 for the Department of Food Science. By 1960, the Department flourished and was recognized by the Institute of Food Technologists as being one of the most outstanding departments in the country.

The John J. Powers Student Activity Room was dedicated Nov. 8 2002 at UGA. Designed to provide food science students with a space for activities and meetings, the activity room was made possible by donations from alumni, employees and friends of the UGA food science department.

“While instruction is the core of any college education, interaction with peers and professors in informal settings enhances the overall educational experience for students,” says Mark Harrison, a professor in the food science department. “This room will provide our students with space for this purpose.”

The room also will serve as permanent recognition of John J. Powers, Distinguished Professor Emeritus of Food Science. As head of the department, Powers was instrumental in developing the department into an internationally recognized program.

== Research interests ==
Powers's research was food processing and sensory evaluation.

== Professional service ==
Dr. Powers was a long-time member of the Institute of Food Technologists (IFT), where he served as President in 1986-87 and was an editor of the Journal of Food Science and Journal of Food Quality. He received the William V. Cruess Award in 1982, the Nicholas Appert Award in 1984, and was elected a Fellow of IFT in 1974. He was also a long-time member of Phi Tau Sigma, serving as President in 1962. Among many other publications, Dr. Powers edited Volume 2 of “Pioneers in Food Science” (Food and Nutrition Press, 2004) and was the author of the chapters about Dr. Carl R. Fellers in that book.

== Awards ==
- Fellow - Institute of Food Technologist- 1976
- Nicholas Appert Award from the Institute of Food Technologists- 1984
- William V. Cruess Award from the Institute of Food Technologists- 1982

== Scholarships ==
The $1,500 John J. & Irene T. Powers Scholarship endowed by IFT member John J. Powers and his wife Irene. Information about this scholarship can be obtained through IFT. Awarded to a graduate student majoring in Food Science with outstanding academic potential and a commitment to food processing and sensory evaluation fields as a career goal.
