= Allyne L. Merrill =

American physicist (1863–1941)

Allyne L. Merrill (1863 – February 26, 1941) was an American physicist who served as faculty secretary of the Massachusetts Institute of Technology (MIT) from 1906 to June 1934.

In 1885 Merrill earned his Bachelor of Science in physics. In 1890 he played a key role in Samuel Cate Prescott's enrolment in MIT. At the time, Merrill was an instructor in mechanism at MIT. He was promoted to instructor in 1890, then assistant professor in 1903 and eventually professor during his tenure. Merrill was elected as faculty secretary in 1906 and served until 1934. Merrill and Prescott were part of the induction ceremony of Karl Taylor Compton as the new MIT President on June 6, 1930.

== Selected work ==
- Schwamb, P., A.L. Merrill, & W.H. James (Revised by V.L. Doughtie) (1951). Elements of Mechanism, 6th Edition. New York: John Wiley & Sons.
