= Ernest H. Wiegand =

American food scientist (1886–1973)

- Born: July 10, 1886
- Died: April 1973 (aged 86)
- Awards: Nicholas Appert Award (1960)
- Scientific career
- Fields: Horticulture
- Workplaces: Oregon State University

Ernest H. Wiegand (July 10, 1886 – April 1973) was a professor of horticulture at Oregon State University who, in 1925 during Prohibition, developed a brine method that led to the modern maraschino cherry.

The food sciences building on the university's Corvallis, Oregon campus, Wiegand Hall, is named in his honour.

== Awards ==
He won the Nicholas Appert Award in 1960.
