= C. Olin Ball =

American food scientist (1893–1970)

Charles Olin Ball
- Born: 1893
- Died: 1970 (aged 76–77)
- Citizenship: American
- Education: George Washington University (Ph.D., 1922)
- Known for: Study of thermal death time
- Awards: Nicholas Appert Award (1947)
- Scientific career
- Fields: Food science
- Workplaces: American Can Company; Owens-Illinois Glass Company; Rutgers University

Charles Olin Ball (1893–1970) was an American food scientist and inventor who was involved in the thermal death time studies in the food canning industry during the early 1920s. This research was used as standard by the United States Food and Drug Administration for calculating thermal processes in canning. He was also a charter member of the Institute of Food Technologists in 1939 and inducted among the first class of its fellows in 1970 for his work in academia and industry.

== Biography ==
A native of Abilene, Kansas, Ball earned his BS in mathematics before going to graduate school at George Washington University from 1919 to 1922. While at George Washington University, he worked for the National Canners Association by researching the sterilization of canned foods. Ball's formula method of thermal death time became the standard of the United States Food and Drug Administration for calculating thermal processes.

After earning his PhD from George Washington University in 1922, Ball worked with the American Can Company in Illinois and New York where he earned 29 patents. He worked at Owens-Illinois Glass Company from 1944 to 1946 before going to Rutgers University as a professor and later chair of the food science department during 1949–1963.

== Institute of Food Technologists involvement ==
Ball was a charter member of Institute of Food Technologists when it was founded in 1939, and its president in 1963–64. He won the Nicholas Appert Award in 1947, and was among the first class of 27 fellows inducted in 1970. Ball was the first editor-in-chief of Food Technology from 1947 to 1950.

== Death and legacy ==
Ball died in 1970. Rutgers' food science department established an undergraduate scholarship in his honor for those students majoring in food science who excel in food engineering courses.

== Selected work ==
- Ball, C.O. and F.C.W. Olson (1957). Sterilization in Food Technology. 1st Edition. New York: McGraw-Hill Book Company.
