= Journal of Food Quality =

- Discipline: Food science
- Language: English
- Edited by: Terri D. Boylston

Publication details
- History: 1977-present
- Publisher: Wiley-Blackwell
- Frequency: Bimonthly
- Impact factor: 2.450 (2020)

Standard abbreviations
- ISO 4: J. Food Qual.

Indexing
- CODEN: JFQUD7
- ISSN: 0146-9428 (print); 1745-4557 (web)
- LCCN: 77642300
- OCLC no.: 03252366

Links
- Journal homepage; Online access; Online archive

The Journal of Food Quality is a peer-reviewed scientific journal that publishes research "on the handling of food from a quality and sensory perspective." It was established in 1977 and is published by Wiley-Blackwell. The journal moved to online-only publication in 2011.
