= Philip K. Bates =

American food scientist

Philip K. Bates (July 2, 1902 – December 21, 1993) was an American food scientist who was involved in the development of food freezing, dehydration, and concentration both in academia and in industry.

== Early life ==
A native of Massachusetts, Bates earned his S.B. in biology and public health in 1924 from the Massachusetts Institute of Technology (MIT). He would later earn his Ph.D. in bacteriology from MIT in December 1928. While pursuing his PhD, Bates worked at MIT, Boston University's School of Medicine, Tufts University School of Dental Medicine, and Tufts University School of Medicine.

== Career ==
After earning his PhD, Bates worked for Frigidaire in Dayton, Ohio in their research laboratory where he studied freezing's effect on bacteria in foods. He would return to Boston, Massachusetts to work for United Drug Company, later Rexall, becoming head of its laboratories and then chair of its pharmaceutical subsidiary, Riker Laboratories.

Bates worked for Carnation (now part of Nestle) in Van Nuys, California from 1952 until his 1966. During his time at Carnation, he would deal with product development and nutrition studies of new products. Bates also developed drying and concentration of liquid foods and aseptic packaging. He even worked on pesticide residual studies in dairy products prior to his 1966 retirement.

== Service with the Institute of Food Technologists ==
A charter member of the Institute of Food Technologists (IFT) when it was founded in 1939, Bates would serve as IFT treasurer and later became president in 1954–1955. He also was named an IFT Fellow in 1974.

== Service with the American Chemical Society ==
Bates was also active in the American Chemical Society (ACS), serving as Editor of the Journal of Agricultural and Food Chemistry from 1965 to 1982. and was active in ACS's Agricultural and Food Chemistry Division.

== Death and legacy ==
Bates died in California on December 21, 1993. The Southern California section of IFT established a scholarship in his honor in 1994. He was survived by three sons, Charles (1930–2006), Philip, Jr.; and Brad. Charles would be elected to the IFT presidency in 1985–1986, making them the only father-son combination to ever serve as presidents of the IFT.

== Selected works ==
- McFarlan, R.L., P.K. Bates, and E.C. Merrill. "Spectrographic Characteristics of Vitamin A Materials." Industrial and Engineering Chemistry. 1940(1):645-7.
- Prescott, S.C., P.K. Bates, and M.E. Highlands. (1932). "Numbers of Bacteria in Frozen Food Stored at Several Temperatures." Journal of the American Public Health Association. 22(3):257-62.
