= Steven R. Tannenbaum =

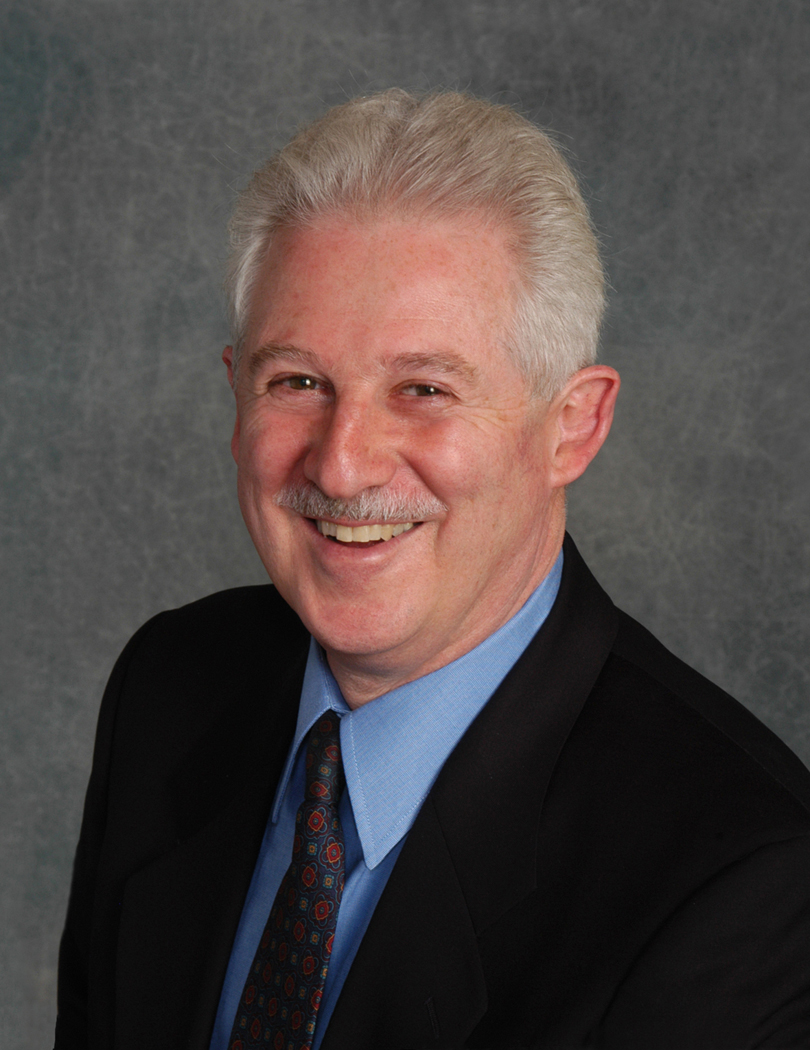
Steven R. Tannenbaum in 2004

Steven R. Tannenbaum was born and grew up in the Rockaways of Queens, New York City. He attended the Hebrew Institute of Long Island through 9th grade, then moved to Hewlett, Long Island where he graduated from Woodmere H.S. in 1954. He attended the Massachusetts Institute of Technology from 1954-1962, earning a B.S. in Food Technology in 1958 and a PhD. in Food Science in 1962. He was then appointed to Assistant Professor in 1964 in the Department of Food Science and Technology leading up to Full Professor in 1974. Throughout his career he was mentored by Samuel A. Goldblith up until his death in 2001. In 1973 Tannenbaum did a sabbatical at the Hebrew University of Jerusalem, where he decided to switch his career into cancer research at the suggestion of Gerald Wogan.

He has held appointments at MIT including Director of the Division of Toxicology (1996-1998) which he cofounded along with Douglas Lauffenburger, of the Division, and then Department of Biological Engineering, the first new academic Department in the MIT School of Engineering in over a generation, and Co-Director from 1998 to July 2003. In 2003-2004 he was the Director of Research of the Cambridge University-MIT Institute.

== Research interests ==
Tannenbaum’s areas of research include mechanisms of biochemical activation of chemicals to electrophilic forms that bind to DNA and proteins; application of biomarkers to the prediction of the severity of inflammatory disease; the role of endogenous nitric oxide in inflammation, cytotoxicity, and DNA damage; and development of new tools for drug metabolism, pharmacokinetics, and toxicology. Current research focuses on the causes of IBD, prognostic biomarkers for Dengue fever, human microphysiological systems for drug safety and PK/PD, and the role of nitric oxide in brain pathology, including Alzheimer’s Disease and ASD.

== Notable contributions ==
The Tannenbaum laboratory has made important contributions to the etiology of cancer from both environmental and endogenous factors. Most important was the first discovery of the mammalian synthesis of nitrogen oxides, and its linkage to inflammation and injury. This led to a collaboration with Michael Marletta, whose discovery of the enzymatic source of nitric oxide revealed the source of one of the most important signaling molecules in biology. Other notable discoveries include biomarkers of exposure to chemical carcinogens, and predictive biomarkers of Dengue Hemorrhagic Fever. His laboratory also collaborated with Linda Griffith in the development of the LiverChip, a microphysiological, immunocompetent, flow-through human liver bioreactor.

== Honors and awards ==
Dr. Tannenbaum has won a number of awards including being an Elected Member of the National Academy of Medicine in 1996, Chemistry in Cancer Award of the American Association for Cancer Research in 2008, Fellow of the American Chemical Society in 2011, and Fellow of the American Association for the Advancement of Science in 2006. Other notable awards include Samuel Cate Prescott Award for Research, Institute of Food Technologists, 1970; Founders Award, ACS Division of Chemical Toxicology, 2013; Lifetime Achievement Award, NIH/NCI Cancer Redox Biology Faculty, 2012; Princess Takamatsu Distinguished Lecturer, Japan, 2006; Babcock Hart Award, Institute of Food Technologists, 1980.
