= Marcel Loncin Research Prize =

The Marcel Loncin Research Prize was established in 1994. It is awarded by the Institute of Food Technologists (IFT) in even-numbered years to fund basic chemistry, physics, and/or engineering research applied to food processing and improving food quality. It is named for Marcel Loncin (1920-1995), a Belgian-born, French chemical engineer who did food engineering research while a professor at the Centre d'Enseignement et de Recherches des Industries Alimentaries (CERIA) and afterwards at the Food Engineering Department of the University of Karlsruhe (TH), Germany. It was the third and final IFT award as of 2006 that has been named for a then-living person.

Award winners receive USD 50,000 in two annual installments and a plaque from the Marcin Loncin Endowment Fund of the IFT.

== Winners ==
| Year | Winner |
|---|---|
| 1994 | Werner Bauer |
| 1996 | John M.V. Blanshard |
| 1998 | Theodore P. Labuza |
| 2000 | Syed S.H. Rizvi |
| 2002 | Jozef L. Kokini |
| 2004 | Dietrich Knorr |
| 2006 | Jose Miguel Aguilera |
| 2008 | Shelly J. Schmidt |
| 2010 | D. Julian McClements |
| 2014 | Lisa J. Mauer |
