= Barbara Byrd Keenan =

Fifth CEO Institute of Food Technologists
- In office 2003–2013

Barbara Byrd Keenan is an American businesswoman, who was the fifth executive vice president of the Institute of Food Technologists (IFT), a position she held since 2003. Prior to that, she had served as president of the Community Associations Institute and vice president of the International Association of Hospitality Accountants.

== Career ==
A native of Delaware, Keenan earned her degree from Old Dominion University in Virginia. After graduation, she went to work as executive vice president for the International Association of Hospitality Accountants (IAHA) which won awards for educational programming, promotion, marketing, and publications.

In 1990, Keenan joined the Community Associations Institute in Alexandria, Virginia as president. While as president, she turned the organization around from a struggling, almost bankrupt organization with 10,000 members to one that was financially sound with 17,000 members before she left for IFT in 2003.

She was the CEO of the Endocrine Society in Washington, D.C., until February 5, 2020.

== Awards and memberships ==
- American Society of Association Executives - Executive Committee Vice Chairman (2 terms) and Secretary-Treasurer (2 terms) & Charter Fellow.
