= Fred C. Blanck =

American food scientist

Frederick Conrad Blanck
- Born: October 14, 1881; Baltimore, Maryland
- Died: January 11, 1965; Baltimore, Maryland
- Citizenship: United States
- Education: The Johns Hopkins University (B.S. 1903, Ph.D. 1907)
- Scientific career
- Fields: Food Science
- Workplaces: H.J. Heinz Company; Mellon Institute of Industrial Research; IFT; USDA

Frederick Conrad Blanck (October 14, 1881 – January 11, 1965) was an American food scientist who was involved in the founding of the Institute of Food Technologists (IFT), which was involved in the publishing of food and nutrition articles and books.

== IFT founding ==
A charter member of IFT when it was founded in 1939, Blanck proposed at the last session of the meeting at the Massachusetts Institute of Technology to have the new society dealing with food science in the United States be called the Institute of Food Technologists. He would serve as president of IFT in 1944-45 and would be named the first winner of the Stephen M. Babcock Award, now the Babcock-Hart Award, in 1948.

== Career ==
During his career, Blanck worked for the H.J. Heinz Company, the Mellon Institute of Industrial Research (Carnegie Mellon University since 1967), and the United States Department of Agriculture.

== Selected works ==
- A. H, Jr., F.C. Blanck, and F.C. Wooster. (1950). Reviews of Nutritional Data. Pittsburgh: H.J. Heinz Company.
- Blanck, F.C., Ed. (1955). Handbook of Food and Agriculture. New York: Reinhold Publishing Corp.
