= George J. Hucker =

American microbiologist (1893–1988)

George J. Hucker (August 19, 1893 – May 18, 1988) was an American microbiologist who was involved in the founding of the Institute of Food Technologists and was involved in dairy microbiology.

== Career at Cornell University ==
Hucker was a professor of bacteriology and chief of the New York State Agricultural Experiment Station in Geneva, New York during the early 20th century.

== Involvement in the Institute of Food Technologists ==
Hucker attended an international conference held at the Massachusetts Institute of Technology (MIT) in 1937 that proved so successful that would lead to two more meeting preliminary meetings in 1938 and 1939. These two meetings at MIT would lead to another conference later in 1939 that would lead to the formation of the Institute of Food Technologists (IFT) with Hucker being elected as Secretary-Treasurer, a position he would serve until 1947, when he was elected IFT President. Hucker would serve as IFT President during 1947-48 while his previous position was given to Carl R. Fellers, head of the food technology department at the University of Massachusetts Amherst. Hucker would be named an IFT Fellow in 1976.
