= Roy C. Newton =

American food scientist

Roy C. Newton was an American food scientist who was involved in research and development of antioxidants in food and meat products during the 20th century. He also was a founding member of the Institute of Food Technologists (IFT) in 1939.

== IFT founding ==
A charter member of IFT, Newton was elected as its vice president in 1939 and 1940. He was later elected IFT president, serving from 1942 to 1943; received the Nicholas Appert Award in 1949; and was elected as a fellow in 1971.

== Career ==
At the time of IFT's founding, he was vice president of research and development for Swift & Company in Chicago, Illinois, a position he held during 1939-1954. In 1952, his leadership was recognized with the presentation of the IRI Medal by the Industrial Research Institute. During his time as vice president, Newton was also involved in getting gum guaric approved for use as a food additive, the first ever antioxidant approved for use in food. Newton was also active in the American Chemical Society, serving as chair of the Chicago section in 1942-3.

== Articles authored ==
- Newton, R.C. (1954). "Viewpoints on the Problems of Chemicals in Foods: The Viewpoint of a Food Manufacturer." American Journal of Public Health Nations Health. 44(8): 985-987.
