= Samuel Goldblith =

American food scientist (1919–2001)

Samuel Abraham Goldblith
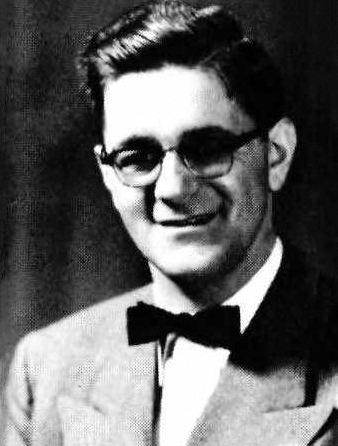
- Samuel Goldblith in 1956
- Born: May 5, 1919; Lawrence, Massachusetts, United States
- Died: December 28, 2001 (aged 82); Peabody, Massachusetts, United States
- Education: Massachusetts Institute of Technology
- Scientific career
- Fields: Food science
- Workplaces: Massachusetts Institute of Technology

Samuel Abraham Goldblith (May 5, 1919 – December 28, 2001) was an American food scientist. While involved in World War II, he studied malnutrition, and later was involved in food research important for space exploration.

== Early life ==
A native of Lawrence, Massachusetts, Goldblith was the son of a Russian immigrant. He received his S.B. in biology from the Massachusetts Institute of Technology (MIT) in 1940. During his student days, he was also involved in Reserve Officers' Training Corps, and began serving with the United States Army Corps of Engineers as a Second Lieutenant in the Philippines.

== World War II and POW ==
While in the Philippines, Goldblith would be part of the US Army contingent involved in the Battle of the Philippines and captured by the Japanese following the Battle of Corregidor. Having been surrendered on Corregidor, Goldblith avoided the Bataan Death March and Camp O'Donnell, being sent instead to one of the Cabanatuan POW camps. In November 1942 he endured a trip aboard the "hell ship", Nagato Maru, to Japan.

Despite being a POW, Goldblith was able to conduct scientific research, even studying malnutrition and related diseases affecting those around him. His knowledge of botany and chemistry would save the lives of many of his fellow soldiers while a POW. These studies included beriberi, hypoproteinemia, and Vitamin A deficiencies. Goldblith was able to use iodine from his medical kit to dose the foul water in his canteen in an effort to prevent dysentery. His research would be published in the journal Science in September 1946 and in the Office of Naval Research Reports in 1947.

Goldblith would earn two Bronze Stars and one Silver Star for his service and be discharged as a Captain in 1946. In later years, Goldblith and his wife, the former Diana Greenberg, would remain in close contact with the Belgian Catholic nuns in the Philippines who were instrumental in saving the lives of so many with their food and medical supplies during the war.

== Return to MIT ==
Upon his discharge from the US Army, Goldblith would return to MIT where he would earn his S.M. in 1947 and his Ph.D. in 1949, both in food technology. He would join the food technology faculty at MIT in 1949, rising to the rank of professor in 1959. Goldblith would serve as acting department chair following Bernard E. Proctor's death in 1959 and remained in that position until Nevin Scrimshaw took over as department chair in 1961. Goldblith would remain as professor until 1974 when he became MIT's director of the Industrial Liaison Program (ILP), a position he would hold until 1978. After that, Goldblith would be promoted to MIT's vice president of resource development until 1986, then promoted again to Senior advisor to the President of MIT, where he would retire in 1992.

== Research at MIT ==
During his service at MIT, Goldblith led the development of food irradiation, of freeze-drying and microwave technology, all of which would prove important for the Space Race. This included Project Mercury, Project Gemini, and Project Apollo, but would later stretch to Skylab, the Space Shuttle, and even to the International Space Station.

The first graduate student that Goldblith worked with was Yiachi Aikawa from Japan. Goldblith's work with Aikawa would both develop a lifelong friendship and allow Goldblith to heal from the emotional wounds he suffered as a POW from World War II. Aikawa would later create TechnoVenture Co., Ltd., the first venture capital firm in Japan. He was also the son of Yoshisuke Aikawa, the founder of Nissan Motors. Their relationship would lead to the opening of the MIT Japan office in 1976 as well. It would also earn Goldblith the Second Grade of the Order of the Sacred Treasure in 1984 for his efforts in strengthening Japanese-American relationships, only the second non-Japanese to do so at that time.

Goldblith authored over 250 articles in scientific journals and edited or co-edited six books in food science and technology. He would also author three additional books on the history of MIT, including his 1996 autobiography Appetite for Life.

== Awards and honors ==
- Institute of Food Technologists (IFT) Babcock-Hart Award - 1969.
- IFT Nicholas Appert Award - 1970.
- IFT Fellow - 1970, among the first class of 27 fellows inducted.
- Underwood-Prescott Professorship: 1972–1978.
- Foreign Member of the Royal Swedish Academy of Engineering Sciences (1980).

== Personal life ==
Golblith married Diana Greenberg in 1941 and they would remain married until her death in 1990. They would produce two sons (Errol (died 1963) and Jonathan), one daughter (Judith), and two granddaughters (Sarah and Rachel).

== Death and legacy ==
Goldblith died on December 28, 2001, in Peabody, Massachusetts. A memorial service was held at MIT on May 28, 2002, to honor Goldblith. MIT established the Samuel A. Goldblith Career Development Chair in 1993, partially funded by Aikawa's family. This chair has been held by Peter Dedon (Toxicology), James L. Sherley (Bioengineering), and since 2006, Stuart Licht (Chemistry).

== Selected works ==
- Goldblith, S.A. (1996). Appetite for Life: An Autobiography. Trumball, CT: Food & Nutrition Press. ISBN 0-917678-38-9
- Goldblith, S.A. (2004). "Dr. Bernard E. Proctor." In Pioneers in Food Science, Volume 2. J.J. Powers, Ed. Trumball, CT: Food & Nutrition Press.
- Goldblith, S.A. (1946). "Japanese Scientists and the POW's." Science. 27 September: 302–303.
- Goldblith, S.A. (1995). Of Microbes and Molecules: Food Technology, Nutrition, and Applied Biology at M.I.T., 1873-1988. Trumball, CT: Food & Nutrition Press.
- Goldbltih, S.A. (1993). Pioneers in Food Science, Volume 1: Samuel Cate Prescott - M.I.T. Dean and Pioneer Food Technologist. Trumball, CT: Food & Nutrition Press.
- Goldblith, S.A., B.E. Proctor, J.R. Hogness, and W.H. Langham (1949). "The Effect of Cathode Rays Produced at 3000 Kilovolts on Niacin Tagged with C^{14}." Journal of Biological Chemistry. 179(3):1163-1167.
