= Food Products Association =

Former US trade association

Logo of the Food Products Association, which merged with the Grocery Manufacturers Association in 2007.

The Food Products Association (formerly the National Food Processors Association or NFPA) was the principal U.S. scientific and technical trade association representing the food processing industry until 2007. FPA was headquartered in Washington, D.C., with branches in Dublin, CA, and Seattle, WA. The association emphasized governmental and regulatory affairs, scientific research, technical assistance, education, communications, and crisis management.

== History ==
FPA started in 1907 as the National Canners Association. It became the National Food Processors Association in 1978 and the Food Products Association in 2005.

Throughout its work as the National Canners Association for much of the 20th century, this trade organization substantially developed the market for processed food in the United States through the use of scientific expertise to build consumer trust.

On January 1, 2007, FPA merged with the Grocery Manufacturers Association and formed the world's largest trade association representing the food, beverage, and consumer products industry, the Grocery Manufacturers Association/Food Products Association, abbreviated GMA/FPA.

On January 1, 2008, the association rebranded using the name Grocery Manufacturers Association, and FPA's former Seattle, Washington office became independently incorporated under the name Seafood Products Association. In 2020, the Grocery Manufacturers Association rebranded as Consumer Brands Association (CBA).
