= Institute of Food Technologists =

Non-profit organization

- Type: Non-profit
- Founded: 1939; 87 years ago
- Headquarters: Chicago, Illinois, United States
- Website: www.ift.org

The Institute of Food Technologists (IFT) is an international, non-profit scientific society of professionals engaged in food science, food technology, and related areas in academia, government and industry. It has more than 17,000 members from more than 95 countries.

== History ==
=== Early history ===
As food technology grew from the individual family farm to the factory level, including the slaughterhouse for meat and poultry processing, the cannery for canned foods, and bakeries for bread, the need to have personnel trained for the food industry did also. Literature such as Upton Sinclair's The Jungle in 1906 about slaughterhouse operations would be a factor in the establishment of the U.S. Food and Drug Administration (FDA) later that year. The United States Department of Agriculture was also interested in food technology, and research was already being done at agricultural colleges in the United States, including the Massachusetts Institute of Technology (MIT), the University of Illinois at Urbana-Champaign, the University of Wisconsin–Madison, and the University of California, Berkeley. By 1935, two MIT professors, Samuel C. Prescott and Bernard E. Proctor decided that it was time to hold an international conference regarding this. A detailed proposal was presented to MIT President Karl Taylor Compton in 1936 was presented with $1500 of financial aid from MIT for a meeting to be held from June 30 to July 2, 1937, with Compton asking how many people would be in attendance at this meeting. Prescott replied with "fifty or sixty people". 500 people actually attended the event.

This meeting proved so successful that in early 1938 that a second conference would be held in 1939. Initially led by George J. Hucker of the New York State Agricultural Experiment Station (part of Cornell University) in Geneva, New York, a small group meeting was held on August 5, 1938 on forming an organization with an expanded group meeting in New York City on January 16, 1939 to further discuss this. The second conference was held at MIT June 29 to July 1, 1939, with Proctor as conference chair. 600 people attended this event. At the final session, the chairman of the session Fred C. Blanck of the United States Department of Agriculture, proposed that an organization be established as the Institute of Food Technologists. This was approved unanimously. Its first officers were Prescott as President, Roy C. Newton of Swift & Company in Chicago, Illinois, as Vice President, and Hucker as Secretary-Treasurer. By 1949, IFT had 3,000 members.

=== Growth ===
Regional sections were established in IFT as early as 1940 in northern California (San Francisco, Bakersfield, Sacramento). The first IFT Award, the Nicholas Appert Award was established in 1942 by IFT's Chicago section with additional awards being established since then. For the first ten years, IFT officers were President, Vice-President, Secretary, and Treasurer. In 1949, IFT moved into offices in Chicago and created a permanent position of Executive Secretary to run daily organizational operations. Retired U.S. Army Colonel Charles S. Lawrence was named the first Executive Secretary, a position he would hold until 1961 when he was replaced by Calvert L. Willey. During Willey's term as Executive Director (Executive Secretary 1961–1966), IFT would grow from 6,000 members in 1961 to 23,000 members in 1987. Additionally, IFT Divisions were established in 1971 with the Refrigerated and Frozen Foods Division being the first. The IFT Student Division was established in 1975, and was reorganized in 1984 to be the IFT Student Association with the chairperson serving as a member of the IFT Board of Directors.

=== Today ===
The governing body of IFT consists of a Board of Directors made up of the President, President-Elect, Immediate Past-President, Treasurer, Student Association President, Student Association Immediate Past-President, Student Association President-Elect, IFT Foundation Chair, and Executive Vice President, along with twelve board members. IFT also communicates with the news media, using sixty scientists to discuss the scientific perspective on food issues. IFT is also active in the international level by its membership in the International Union of Food Science and Technology, headquartered in Oakville, Ontario, Canada. Education has always been a focus of IFT, going as far back as 1941, with the desire to have uniform education standards in food technology. Education standards for undergraduate students were approved by IFT in 1966 for food science and technology. These standards were revised and updated in 1977, 1992, 2001, and 2011. Today, IFT sits on the advisory council for the International Food Protection Training Institute.

=== IFT Annual Meeting & Food Expo ===
IFT largest in-person gathering is IFT's Annual Meeting & Food Expo. This event, which offers more than 100 scientific and applied education sessions and an expo featuring 1,000+ exhibiting companies, regularly attracts 23,000 food professionals from more than 90 countries.

=== Certification ===
IFT offers the Certified Food Scientist (CFS) designation. The CFS is the only globally-recognized certification for food scientists, and has more than 1600 certificants in 55 countries. The CFS program is officially endorsed by the Australian Institute of Food Science Technology (AIFST) as well as the Canadian Institute of Food Science and Technology (CIFST). Earning the CFS consists of meeting certain academic and work experience requirements and passing an exam in the following content areas:

- Product development
- Quality assurance and quality control
- Food chemistry and food analysis
- Regulatory
- Food microbiology
- Food safety
- Food engineering
- Sensory evaluation and consumer testing

It was designed to meet the International Standards Organization (ISO) 17024 standards for certification programs.

=== Global Food Traceability Center ===
IFT's Global Food Traceability Center (GFTC) is the global resource and authoritative voice on food traceability. Supported by its founding sponsors and guided by its advisory council, GFTC is designed to accelerate adoption and implementation of practical traceability solutions across the global food system.

The center works to deliver events, research, and support services that will help to increase understanding of food traceability across four business platforms:

- Research
- Protocols & standards
- Education & training
- Technology transfer

== Awards ==
All awards except the Loncin prize have this reference listed below. In 2020 the awards were rebranded into one of six categories and renamed to be in honor of named individual (e.g. Lifetime Achievement Award in Honor of Nicolas Appert).

- Nicolas Appert Award (1942) – IFT's highest honor. Lifetime contributions to food technology.
- Babcock-Hart Award (1948) – Significant contributions in food technology that resulted in public health improvements through some aspect of nutrition.
- Bor S. Luh International Award (1956 – International Award from 1956 to 2004) – Individual member or institution that had outstanding efforts in one of the following in food technology: 1) international exchange of ideas, 2) better international understanding, and/or 3) practical successful technology transfer to an economically depressed area in a developed or developing nation.
- Food Technology Industrial Achievement Award (1959) – Developing an outstanding food process or product that represents a significant advance in food technology or food production.
- Samuel Cate Prescott Award (1964) – Outstanding ability of research in food technology. This is for researchers who are under 36 years of age or who are a maximum ten years after earning their highest academic degree whichever is later.
- William V. Cruess Award (1970) – Excellence in teaching food science and technology. It is the only award that students can vote.
- Carl R. Fellers Award (1984) – For IFT members who have brought honor and recognition to food science through achievements in areas other than education, research, development, and technology transfer.
- Calvert L. Willey Award (1989) – For meritorious and imaginative service in IFT.
- Stephen S. Chang Award for Lipid or Flavor Science (1993) – For contribution in lipid and flavor science.
- IFT Industrial Scientist Award (1994) – For technical contributions that advances the food industry.
- Marcel Loncin Research Prize (1994)- For basic research involving chemistry, physics, and food engineering applied to food research and food quality.
- IFT Research & Development Award (1997) – For significant research and development contributions to better understanding within food science, food technology, and nutrition.
- Elizabeth Fleming Stier Award (1997) – Humanitarian and unselfish dedication that results in significant contributions to the well-being in the food industry, academia, general public, or students.
- Bernard L. Oser Award (2000) – For contributing to the scientific knowledge of food ingredient safety or in leadership in establishing food ingredient safety evaluation or regulation.
- Myron Solberg Award (2004) – For providing leadership in establishing, successfully developing, and continuing a cooperative organization involving academia, government, and industry.
- Sensory and Consumer Sciences Achievement Award (2014) –To recognize excellence within the sensory and consumer sciences field.
- Gilbert A. Leveille Award and Lectureship (2014) – Recognizes outstanding research and/or public service at the interface between the disciplines of nutrition and food science, over a period of five years or more, which has contributed to improved health and well-being.
- WK Kellogg International Food Security Award (2012) – To honor an IFT member working in academics, research institutes or the government, regardless of geographic origin, whose outstanding efforts result in one or more of the following: (1) Enabling and increasing access to nutritious food in non-industrialized countries; (2) Developing emerging technologies and/or research that addresses non-industrialized countries food needs, food safety, and food security; and/or (3) Contributing toward the technological development in one or more local food industries to help foster economic development in non-industrialized countries.
- George Washington Carver Award (2020) – To recognize the work an individual or an organization in the science of food have done to advance equity, inclusion, and diversity.

== Divisions ==
These are divisions of interest by the IFT Members

- Aquatic food products – seafood
- Biotechnology
- Carbohydrate
- Dairy foods – dairy products
- Education
- Extension and outreach
- Food chemistry
- Food engineering
- Food Law and Regulations – legal aspects in food processing and technology
- Food microbiology
- Food packaging
- Foodservice – restaurants.
- Fruit & vegetable products
- IFT Student Association
- International
- Marketing & management
- Muscle foods – meat, poultry, and seafood
- Nonthermal processing – food processing through using alternative lethal agents such as high pressure, electric field, UV, ultrasound and cold plasma
- Nutraceuticals & functional foods – combining nutrition and medicine for healthy living
- Nutrition
- Product development – developing foods from the laboratory to the general public
- Quality assurance – food quality
- Refrigerated and frozen foods – foods that are processed through refrigeration and freezing
- Sensory and consumer sciences
- Toxicology and safety evaluation – food allergy mainly

== Sections ==
These are usually cities, states, and regions. If a region is mentioned, a city in that region is mentioned which include areas surrounded by the city.

- AK-SAR-BEN – Nebraska
- Alamo – San Antonio, Texas
- Bluegrass – Kentucky
- Bonneville – Utah
- British – Great Britain
- British Columbia – Canadian province
- Cactus – Arizona
- Cascadia – Washington, and Alaska
- Central New Jersey – subsection of New York Section
- Central Valley – subsection of Northern California section
- Chicago
- Dogwood – North Carolina
- Florida
- Great Lakes – Michigan
- Great Plains – South Dakota, subsection of Minnesota section
- Hawaii
- Indiana
- Intermountain – Idaho
- Iowa
- Japan
- Kansas City – Kansas and western Missouri
- Keystone – Harrisburg, Pennsylvania
- Lake Erie – Cleveland, Ohio
- Lewis & Clark
- Long Island – Brooklyn and Queens, New York
- Longhorn – Dallas, Texas
- Louisiana Gulf Coast – New Orleans, Louisiana
- Magnolia – Mississippi
- Maryland – includes Delaware and West Virginia
- Mid-South – Memphis, Tennessee and eastern Arkansas
- Minnesota
- New York – New York City boroughs of Manhattan, Staten Island, and Bronx, and parts of northern New Jersey.
- Northeast – Maine, Massachusetts, New Hampshire, Rhode Island, and Vermont
- Northern California – San Francisco, Sacramento, Bakersfield
- Northwest Ohio – Toledo, Ohio
- Nutmeg – Connecticut
- Ohio Valley – Cincinnati and Columbus, Ohio
- Oklahoma
- Oregon
- Ozark – Western Arkansas and southwest Missouri
- Philadelphia – Includes eastern Pennsylvania
- Pittsburgh – Includes western Pennsylvania
- Rocky Mountain – Colorado and University of Wyoming
- San Joaquin– Bakersfield, Fresno, California
- South Eastern – Alabama, Georgia, and South Carolina (Dixie: 1950–2007)
- South Florida – Miami, Florida
- Southern California – Los Angeles and San Diego
- St. Louis – includes southern Illinois and eastern Missouri
- Volunteer – All of Tennessee except Memphis
- Washington, D.C. – includes Virginia
- Western New York
- Wisconsin

== Student Association ==
The IFT Student Association (IFTSA) has 2000 members whom are also considered non-voting members of IFT. The association was established in 1975 under the name IFT Student Division, it was renamed in 1984 to its current name. The governing body consists of the Board of Directors including the President, President-Elect, Immediate Past-President, 5 Vice Presidents, 4 Members-at-large, IFT Staff Liaison, and Advisor. Student association members may attend IFT programming at a discounted rate as well as student-specific events, competitions, and awards.

The Student Association currently consists of 60 chapters at Universities across the world. Universities may petition the IFT Higher Education Review Board to receive curriculum program approval as well.

== Executive vice presidents ==
Between IFT's founding in 1939 and 1949, the institute had elected a secretary and treasurer that kept up with the daily operations of the institute. By 1949, the membership had reached 3,000 and it was decided to create an Executive Secretary position and establish national office in Chicago. Since then, the position's name has changed twice to its current name. There have been six Executive Vice Presidents shown below:

- Charles S. Lawrence: 1949–61
- Calvert L. Willey: 1961–87
- Howard W. Mattson: 1987–91
- Daniel E. Weber: 1991–2003
- Barbara Byrd Keenan: 2003–2013
- Christie Tarantino, FASAE, CAE: 2014–Present

== Member grades ==
There are six member grades within IFT:

- Student member – A full-time student working on an Associate of Science degree or higher in food science, food technology, or a related field. All applications must be endorsed by a faculty member.
- Premier Early Career – A person who is within three years of graduating and shows interest in entering the food industry and supporting the Institute's objective.
- Premier Member – A person active in the food industry who shows interest in supporting the Institute's objective.
- Networking & Engagement – A person who shows interest in supporting the Institute's objective.
- Emeritus Member – Any retired Member who has been an IFT Member for a minimum of twenty years.
- Joint Member – Membership held jointly with IFT and the American Society for Nutrition (ASN) or the Australian Institute of Food Science and Technology (AIFST).

== Publications ==
The Institute also has many publications that are both in print and online that are shown below:

- Food Technology (1947) – IFT's monthly magazine available to all members. Besides the monthly columns dealing with food processing, food packaging, ingredients, food safety and quality, nutraceuticals, food, medicine & health, culinary, and consumer trends, it also focuses on in-depth issues such as biotechnology, food safety, and nutrition.
- Journal of Food Science or JFS (Founded in 1936 as Food Research) – IFT's premier scientific journal dealing with all peer-reviewed aspects of food science (food chemistry, food microbiology, food engineering, toxicology, nanoscale materials, nutrition, and sensory evaluation. It annually publishes over 400 papers and 2,500 pages with authors from 90 countries and readers from 50 countries internationally. The Library of Congress in 2004 put JFS as one of only 300 journals as a high priority ... (ISSN).

Both Food Technology and the Journal of Food Science can be accessed in print or online. Other publications are shown below:

- The Journal of Food Science Education or JSFE (2002 – Online only) – This quarterly journal deals with innovations, techniques, and methods to improve education in food science and technology.
- Comprehensive Reviews in Food Science and Food Safety (2002 – Online only) – This journal, published bimonthly, deals with a broad review of a narrowly defined topic relating to food science and technology, including physiology, economics, history, nutrition, microbiology, engineering, processing, and genetics. All aspects of these reviews are studied, including strengths, weaknesses, and research differences in order to present insightful investigation, including interpretation, summary, and conclusion.
- IFT Weekly Newsletter – A weekly e-mail newsletter sent out every Wednesday about issues within the food industry, including food companies, food research, food regulations, and IFT itself.
- Nutraceutical Newsletter – An e-mail newsletter similar to the IFT Weekly Newsletter though it deals specifically with nutraceuticals and functional foods.
- IFT Books – The Institute has four book publishers that offer membership discounts, including IFT Press (a partnership with Wiley-Blackwell), Grey House Publishing, DESteck Publications, and Taylor and Francis, on food science and technology.
- Three annual buyers guides are also published: Food Technology Buyer's Guide, Nutraceutical Buyer's Guide, and Annual Guide to Food Industry Services. These are usually published as a supplement to Food Technology magazine.

In 2016 they initiated and funded the documentary Food Evolution by Scott Hamilton Kennedy
