= Bor S. Luh International Award =

The Bor S. Luh International Award has been awarded every year since 1956. Before 2005, this award was named the International Award. It is given to an individual or institution that had outstanding efforts in one of the following areas in food technology: 1) International exchange of ideas, 2) better international understanding, and/or 3) practical successful technology transfer to an economically depressed area in a developed or developing area.

The award was renamed for Bor S. Luh (1916-2001), who was born and educated in China before completing his education in the United States. Luh was the first president of the Chinese American Food Society in 1974-5 and received its Professional Achievement Award in 1984.

Award winners receive a plaque from the Bor S. Luh Endowment Fund of the Institute of Food Technologists Foundation and a USD 3000 honorarium.

== Winners ==
| Year | Winner |
|---|---|
| 1956 | Robert S. Schull |
| 1957 | Laurence V. Burton |
| 1958 | Henri Cheftel |
| 1959 | Ross A. Chapman |
| 1960 | James R. Vickery |
| 1961 | Maynard A. Joslyn |
| 1962 | Lawrence J. Lynch |
| 1963 | Emil M. Mrak |
| 1964 | E.C. Bate-Smith |
| 1965 | Moritmer L. Anson |
| 1966 | George F. Stewart |
| 1967 | Zoltan I. Kertesz |
| 1968 | Max Milner |
| 1969 | Nevin S. Scrimshaw |
| 1970 | David B. Hand |
| 1971 | Alton Altschul |
| 1972 | Fritz H. Reuter |
| 1973 | Francis Aylward |
| 1974 | Hisateru Mitsuda |
| 1975 | Georg A. Borgstrom |
| 1976 | Clinton O. Chichester |
| 1977 | Joseph H. Hulse |
| 1978 | Stephan Bogyo |
| 1979 | John Hawthorn |
| 1980 | John C. Ayres |
| 1981 | Frode Bramsnaes |
| 1982 | Frederick Jack Francis |
| 1983 | Frank V. Kosikowski |
| 1984 | James Bunnell |
| 1985 | Keith H. Steinkraus |
| 1986 | Richard L. Hall |
| 1987 | Adolph (Al) S. Clausi |
| 1988 | R. Paul Singh |
| 1989 | Stephen S. Chang |
| 1990 | Judson M. Harper |
| 1991 | University of Georgia-Griffin & University of Nigeria |
| 1992 | Malcolm C. Bourne |
| 1993 | Jose Miguel Aguilera |
| 1994 | Alex Malaspina |
| 1995 | Daryl B. Lund |
| 1996 | Larry R. Beuchat |
| 1997 | Daniel Y.C. Fung |
| 1998 | Herbert W. Ockerman |
| 1999 | B. Ozuma Okezie |
| 2000 | Khee Choon Rhee |
| 2001 | Gustavo V. Barbosa-Canovas |
| 2002 | James H. Moy |
| 2003 | Poul Hansen |
| 2004 | Soliman Y.K. Shenouda |
| 2005 | INTSOY (International Soybean Program) |
| 2006 | Miguel A. Jimenez |
| 2007 | Manjeet S. Chinnan |
| 2008 | Bruce Hamaker |
| 2009 | Anna V.A. Resurreccion |
| 2010 | Syed S.H. Rizvi |
| 2011 | Dr. Gleyn Bledsoe |
| 2012 | Richard F. Stier |
| 2013 | George E. Inglett |
| 2014 | Theodore P. Labuza |
| 2015 | Joe Regenstein |
| 2016 | Jae Park |
| 2017 | Joseph Jen |
| 2018 | Kumar Mallikarjunan |
| 2019 | Joseph Jen |
| 2020 | Valente B. Alvarez |
| 2021 | Joseph Awika |
| 2022 | Melvin Pascall |
