= William Vere Cruess =

American food scientist

William Vere Cruess (August 9, 1886 – March 13, 1968) was an American food scientist who pioneered the use of fruits to produce fruit-juice beverages, fruit-based concentrates and syrups. He was one of the first investigators in the United States to use freezing storage for preservation of fruits and fruit products. Cruess's research also proved beneficial in the rebirth of the wine industry in California after the repeal of Prohibition in 1933.

== Early years ==
A native of San Miguel, California, who grew up impoverished, he earned his B.S. degree in chemistry at the University of California, Berkeley, in 1911, then taught there from 1911 to 1954, even being chair of the Division of Fruit Products from 1938 to 1948. While at Berkeley, Cruess earned his PhD at Stanford University in 1931.

== Research information ==
During his years at UC Berkeley, Cruess co-founded the field of food science, established the technology of fruit dehydration, and came up with the mix that brought the “fruit cocktail” into homes and restaurants everywhere. In addition to inventing fruit cocktail, he introduced the Spanish olive to food processing and was responsible for apricot nectar. He was present at one of the first judgings of California wines in about 1936, and during World War II he perfected food packaging for the United States Army. The UC Berkeley food science department, which also developed prune juice, was later transferred to the campus of the University of California, Davis, during World War II. During this time, he would move his research from Berkeley to Davis. He would also transfer his teaching skills to such future students including Emil M. Mrak, Arthur I. Morgan Jr., and Maynard A. Joslyn.

== Institute of Food Technologists service and awards ==
A charter member of the Institute of Food Technologists (IFT) in 1939, Cruess founded the Northern California Section and served as its first section chair in 1940. In 1942, he became the first award winner for IFT when he won the Nicholas Appert Award and also earned the Babcock-Hart Award in 1955. He also served as IFT President in 1943–4 as well.

== Other awards and honors ==
Cruess was also honored by the American Society for Enology and Viticulture with its Merit Award in 1956. Cruess Hall was dedicated to William V. Cruess in March 1960.

== Death and legacy ==
Cruess died at age 82 in 1968. During his career, he also wrote over 400 articles on food technology and wrote an additional 70 articles from his 1954 retirement to his 1968 death.

In 1970, IFT created the William V. Cruess Award in honor of his lifetime teaching skills that had great influence among others. The Cruess Award is awarded for excellence in teaching of food science and technology and is the only award in IFT in which students can nominate.

== Personal life ==
Cruess married Marie Gleason in 1917 and she was a constant companion through the remainder of his life.

== See also ==
- List of wine personalities
