= Sudhir Sastry =

Sudhir K. Sastry
- Occupations: Food engineer, academic, and author
- Awards: Research and Development Award, Institute of Food Technologists (1977); International Food Engineering Award, ASABE (2015); Lifetime Achievement Award, International Association of Engineering and Food (IAEF) (2015)

Academic background
- Education: Indian Institute of Technology, Kharagpur; University of Florida

Academic work
- Institutions: Ohio State University

Sudhir K. Sastry is a food engineer, academic, and author. He is a professor in the Department of Food, Agricultural and Biological Engineering at Ohio State University (OSU).

Sastry's research started with sterilization and expanded to superior bacterial inactivation methods, including ohmic heating, moderate electric field (MEF) processing; high pressure processing (HPP), and pulsed electric fields (PEF). He has contributed to the development of thermal and nonthermal food manufacturing technologies, and established his lab at Ohio State. In 2001, he set up a 54 kW pilot facility at Ohio State, leading to industrial adoption of ohmic heating; and founded the nonprofit Society of Food Engineering to address the needs of food engineers, which has organized the Conference of Food Engineering since 2018.

Sastry has received awards including the IFT Research and Development Award, Ohio Agricultural Research and Development Center (OARDC) Senior Faculty Research Award, International Association of Engineering and Food (IAEF) Lifetime Achievement Award, International Food Engineering Award, and has also been named as Distinguished Professor of Food, Agricultural and Environmental Sciences at OSU in 2022–23.

== Education ==
Sastry completed his B.S. in Agricultural Engineering from the Indian Institute of Technology, Kharagpur in India, in June 1974. He earned his M.S. in Agricultural Engineering in June 1976 and subsequently achieved his PhD in Mechanical Engineering in August 1980, both from the University of Florida.

== Career ==
Sastry began his academic career as an assistant professor in the Department of Agricultural Engineering at The Pennsylvania State University (PSU) in September 1980. In March 1983, he was appointed as an assistant professor in the Department of Food Science at the same university, where he continued until June 1986, and then served as an Associate Professor for the next year. In September 1987, he joined OSU as an associate professor in the Department of Agricultural Engineering, a position he held until June 1991. Since July 1991, he has been serving as a professor in the Department of Food, Agricultural and Biological Engineering at OSU.

Sastry became the managing director and OSU site co-director of the Center for Advanced Processing and Packaging Studies, a National Science Foundation Industry/University Cooperative Research Center, from February 1999 to January 2006. Later, he served as the Interim Chair of the Department of Food, Agricultural and Biological Engineering at OSU from July 2010 to June 2011.

== Research ==
Sastry's research has focused on developing processing technologies like ohmic heating, high-pressure processing, and moderate electric field processing to inactivate harmful pathogens in food without compromising the quality, for which he received a number of patents and grants. He has collaborated with other researchers to create these processes, aiming to ensure widespread access to safe and healthy foods for future generations.

=== Ohmic heating and electrical conductivity ===
Sastry's co-authored book Aseptic Processing of Foods Containing Solid Particulates explored the techniques and innovations in aseptic processing and packaging, including thermal processing, sustainable packaging, and quality management, aimed at extending shelf life and ensuring food safety. He also co-edited the book Ohmic Heating in Food Processing, discovering the rapid and uniform heating method of Ohmic heating, covering its science, engineering, applications, and benefits for maintaining high-quality food products with minimal changes. Based on nine sections, this book looked into the issues in Ohmic heating equipment, Ohmic heating modeling issues, and process validation issues.

Sastry's group discovered that when all interfering variables were eliminated, ohmic heating accelerated the inactivation of bacterial spores such as Geobacillus stearothermophilus, Bacillus coagulans, and Bacillus subtilis. This discovery led to a deeper understanding of the mechanisms and key spore components affected by the electric field. His work also included detailing kinetics and safety considerations for processing sterile or extended shelf-life products using ohmic and inductive heating.

Sastry and his postdoctoral researcher have developed the first method for sensing pH in situ under pressure.

Since the late 1990s, Sastry's work has focused on the effect of moderate electric fields (MEF) on food tissue, which used electric fields in the range of 1 to 1000 V/cm with or without ohmic heating effects. Discoveries from his research group included fermentation, drying, extraction, and patented tomato peeling process. In December 2012, he worked on a prototype for reheating food in space with NASA, discovering that long-duration space missions need improved, disposable packaging and rapid heating technologies like ohmic heating, which can also enhance Earth-based food sterilization, with packages designed to reheat and contain waste effectively, thereby leading to the development of a rectangular Ohmic heating packet.

== Awards and honors ==
- 1977 – Presidential Recognition for Outstanding Contributions, University of Florida
- 2007 – Senior Faculty Research Award, Ohio Agricultural Research and Development Center (OARDC)
- 2012 – Tech Brief Award for contribution to the development of scientific or technical innovation, NASA
- 2015 – Lifetime Achievement Award, International Association of Engineering and Food (IAEF)
- 2015 – International Food Engineering Award, ASABE
- 2023 – Distinguished Professor of Food, Agricultural and Environmental Sciences (2022–2023), Ohio State University

== Bibliography ==
=== Books ===
- Aseptic Processing of Foods Containing Solid Particulates (2002) ISBN 978-0471363590
- Chemical and Bioprocess Engineering: Fundamental Concepts for First-Year Students (2013) ISBN 978-1461491255
- Ohmic Heating in Food Processing (2014) ISBN 978-1420071085

=== Selected articles ===
- Palaniappan, S., & Sastry, S. K. (1991). Electrical conductivities of selected solid foods during ohmic heating 1. Journal of Food Process Engineering, 14(3), 221–236.
- Palaniappan, S., & Sastry, S. K. (1991). Electrical conductivity of selected juices: influences of temperature, solids content, applied voltage, and particle size 1. Journal of food process engineering, 14(4), 247–260.
- Sastry, S. K., & Barach, J. T. (2000). Ohmic and inductive heating. Journal of food science, 65, 42–46.
- Castro, I., Teixeira, J. A., Salengke, S., Sastry, S. K., & Vicente, A. A. (2004). Ohmic heating of strawberry products: electrical conductivity measurements and ascorbic acid degradation kinetics. Innovative Food Science & Emerging Technologies, 5(1), 27–36.
- Sarang, S., Sastry, S. K., & Knipe, L. (2008). Electrical conductivity of fruits and meats during ohmic heating. Journal of Food Engineering, 87(3), 351–356.
