= IFT Research & Development Award =

Food technology award

The IFT Research & Development Award has been awarded since 1997. It has been awarded by the Institute of Food Technologists (IFT) to scientists who have made recent and significant research and development contributions to the understanding of food science, food technology, or nutrition.

Award winners receive a USD 3000 honorarium and a plaque from IFT.

== Winners ==
Year	Winner(s)
1997	Sudhir K. Sastry
1998	Todd R. Klaenhammer
1999	Bruce A. Watkins
2000	John B. Luchansky
2001	Steven J. Schwartz
2002	Clair J. Hicks
2003	E. Allen Foegeding
2004	Richard W. Hartel
2005	Jose Miguel Aguilera
2006	Eric A. Decker
2007	D. Julian McClements
2008	Casimir C. Akoh
2009	Arun Bhunia
2010	Washington State University Microwave Sterilization Consortium - Juming Tang (Washington State University), C. Patrick Dunne (United States Army Natick Soldier Research, Development and Engineering Center), Kenny Lum (Seafood Products Association), Douglas Hahn (Hormel), and Evan Turek (Kraft Foods). Also included were The Ferrite Company, Rexam, Graphic Packaging, and Ocean Beauty Seafoods LLC
