= Babcock-Hart Award =

Food science public health award

The Public Health Award in honor of Babcock-Hart & Gilbert A. Leveille is an award of the Institute of Food Technologists recognizing scientific and technological contributions that have improved public health through nutrition or a more nutritious food supply. The award is partnered with the Institute for the Advancement of Food and Nutrition Sciences and the American Society for Nutrition, and consists of a $3,000 honorarium and a crystal award from IFT.

The former Babcock-Hart Award was last listed under that name in IFT's 2020 achievement awards, when Mary Ann Lila received the award.

The award incorporates the former Babcock-Hart Award, which was awarded from 1948 through 2020, and the Gilbert A. Leveille Award and Lectureship. The Babcock-Hart Award was named for agricultural chemist Stephen M. Babcock and his colleague Edwin B. Hart.

== Recipients ==
=== Public Health Award in honor of Babcock-Hart & Gilbert A. Leveille ===
Year	Recipient
2024	Mehmood A. Khan
2023	Brent Flickinger
2021	Jianping Wu

=== Babcock-Hart Award ===
Year	Recipient	Year	Recipient
1948	Fred C. Blanck	1985	G. Richard Jansen
1949	Clarence Birdseye	1986	George N. Bookwalter
1950	Carl R. Fellers	1987	John E. Kinsella
1951	Samuel C. Prescott	1988	Theodore P. Labuza
1952	Fred W. Tanner	1989	Elmer H. Marth
1953	Charles N. Frey	1990	Award not given
1954	Edwin J. Cameron	1991	Sanford A. Miller
1955	William V. Cruess	1992	Robert G. Cassens
1956	Gail M. Dack	1993	Mary K. Schmidl
1957	Elmer M. Nelson	1994	Fred R. Shank
1958	Bernard L. Oser	1995	Mark A. Uebersax
1959	Samuel Lepkovsky	1996	Benjamin A. Borenstein
1960	Arnold H. Johnson	1997	Connie M. Weaver
1961	Emil M. Mrak	1998	Haile Mehansho
1962	V. Subrahmanyan	1999	John W. Erdman, Jr.
1963	Maynard A. Joslyn	2000	George E. Inglett
1964	Robert R. Williams	2001	Paul A. Lachance
1965	Tetsujiro Obara	2002	Bill Helferich
1966	Roderick R. Eskew	2003	Chang Y. Lee
1967	Wallace B. Van Arsdel	2004	Bruce A. Watkins
1968	Arthur I. Morgan, Jr.	2005	Jonathan C. Allen
1969	Samuel A. Goldblith	2006	Mary Ellen Camire
1970	Ricardo Bressani	2007	Tung-Ching Lee
1971	Hisateru Mitsuda	2008	Dennis Miller
1972	James W. Pence	2009	Stephen L. Taylor
1973	Clinton O. Chichester	2010	Levente Diosady
1974	Bernard S. Schweigert	2011	Rui Hai Liu
1975	Donald K. Tressler	2012	Richard Black
1976	Harold S. Olcott	2013	Richard Mattes
1977	David B. Hand	2014	Fereidoon Shahidi
1978	Award not given	2015	D. Julian McClements
1979	Robert H. Cotton	2016	Edward Hirschberg
1980	Steven R. Tannenbaum	2017	Eric Decker
1981	Award not given	2018	Casimir Akoh
1982	John C. Ayres	2019	Hang Xiao
1983	James R. Kirk	2020	Mary Ann Lila
1984	Fergus M. Clydesdale		
