= Alexander Mathys =

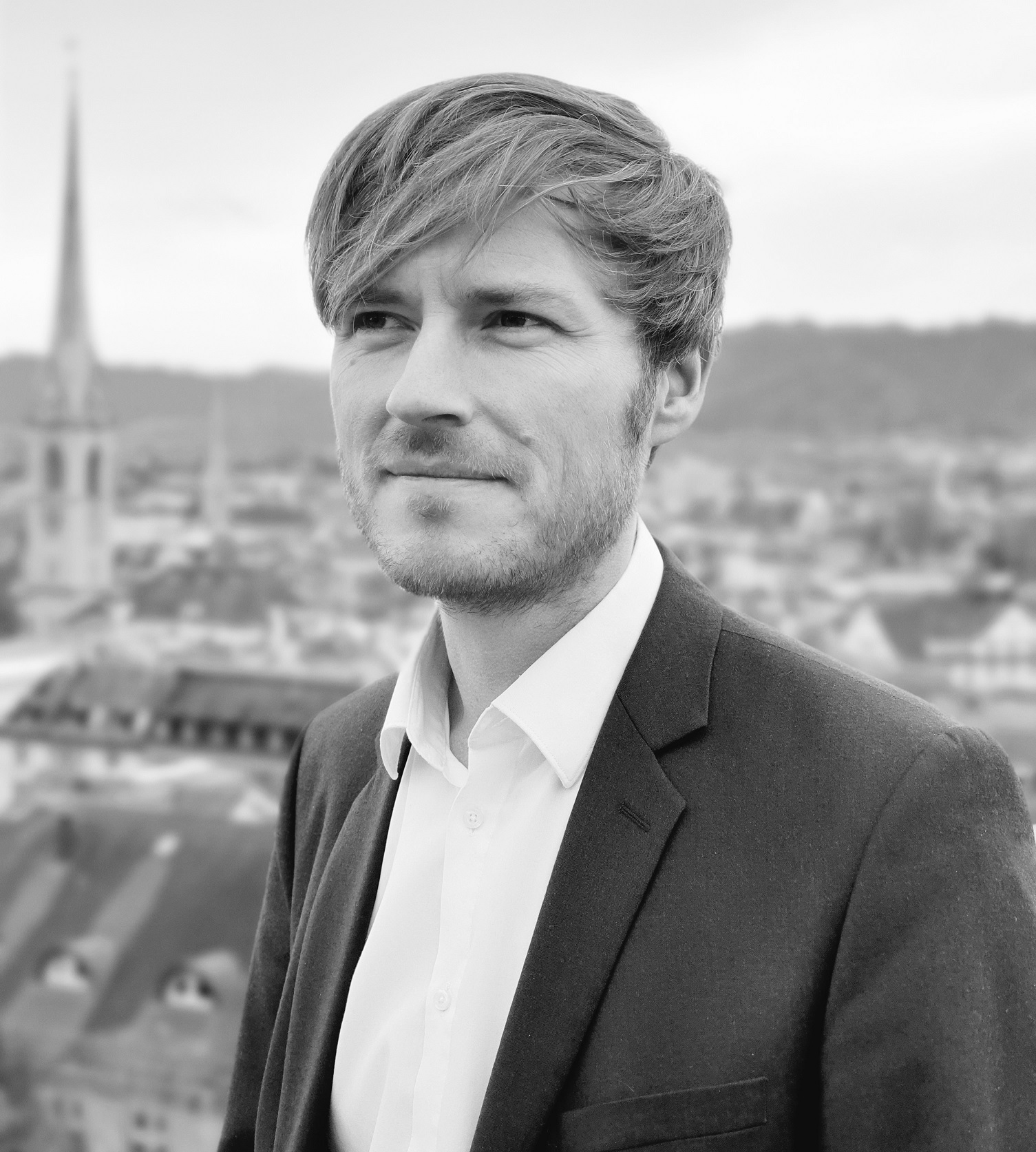
- Alexander Mathys at ETH Zurich
- Education: Dr.-Ing.
- Alma mater: Technische Universität Berlin
- Scientific career
- Fields: Sustainable food; food technology; food systems
- Workplaces: ETH Zurich, Switzerland; German Institute of Food Technology; Nestlé Research Center

Alexander Mathys is a German scientist specializing in sustainable food systems and food technology. He is a Professor (Tenured in 2022) in Sustainable Food Processing at ETH Zurich in Switzerland. His work primarily focuses on finding sustainable and nutritional food and animal feed alternatives that would improve the sustainability performance.

== Research career ==
Mathys earned his Doctor of Engineering from Technische Universität Berlin in 2008. While there, he studied food technology and food preservation processes. He wrote his thesis on the effects high pressure thermal sterilization on Geobacillus and Bacillus spores. His work on this topic earned him several awards, including the George F. Stewart IFT International Research Paper Competition Finalist in 2007 and the ICEF "Young Food Engineer" award in 2008. He went on to work at the Nestlé Research Center in Lausanne, Switzerland from 2009 to 2012. After that, he developed the Bioeconomy department at the German Institute of Food Technology. He was designated a "Young Researcher" at the 60th Meeting of Nobel Laureates in 2010. That year, he was also given the "Einstein Scholarship Award" at the Falling Walls conference. For each of the following two years at the conference, Mathys was designated an A.T. Kearney Scholar, as well. In 2015, he became a tenure-track professor in the Sustainable Food Processing program at ETH Zurich.

In general, much of Mathys' research deals with the study of global food systems and the environmentally unsustainable production of meat. By 2050, meat production is expected to reach 470 million tons annually, double the amount produced in 2018. Mathys' research has focused on the idea that a largely meat-based diet contributes to environmental degradation through the depletion of resources and an increase in the pollution of air, water, and soil. He also notes that a transition to a largely plant-based diet would improve those conditions while also optimizing health and nutrient indicators.

=== Algae as a food source ===
As the head of the Sustainable Food Processing Laboratory at ETH Zurich, Mathys has researched a variety of sustainable food alternatives, including algae. In 2016, he collaborated with the Bühler Group on a project to design algae-based biorefineries to cultivate and process algae as a human food source. His research on the topic has suggested that microalgae can be integrated into food sources as a bulk protein while also providing other nutritional and health benefits including antioxidative, anticoagulant, immunomodulatory, and antihypertensive activities (among others). The high protein content in certain algae may also make it an appropriate replacement for meat, which could reduce the impact that traditional meat sources place on the environment.

Mathys' research has also pointed out that wide-scale cultivation and processing of microalgae is not yet competitive with current biorefinery concepts and technology. Mathys is currently researching nanosecond pulsed electric field treatment as a method of effectively producing algae for human consumption. His work aims to optimize the effectiveness of algae cultivation and processing in the future. Mathys' research is also looking at broader applications of microalgae cultivation, including as a food source and life support system for astronauts traveling long distances and/or creating colonies on other planets.

=== Insects as food and animal feed ===
In addition to algae, Mathys has also researched the efficacy of cultivating and processing insects for both human and animal consumption. He has noted that insects provide a high-protein content and can be cultivated more efficiently than traditional meat sources. He has also stressed that more research is required to study the efficacy of insects for wide-scale human consumption.

His research has also looked at insects as a more environmentally-sustainable source for animal feed. In a 2017 collaboration with the Swiss Federal Institute of Aquatic Science and Technology, Mathys and other researchers from ETH Zurich studied the consumption of biowaste by black soldier fly larvae. The larvae were able to effectively utilize the waste (which included discarded household food and restaurant scraps), allowing for a more sustainable method of eliminating that waste. The larvae could then be used as animal feed with less harmful environmental effects than traditional feed sources, such as fish meal.
