= Stephen S. Chang =

American food scientist

Stephen Szu Shiang Chang (15 August 1918 – 16 December 1996) was a Chinese-born American food scientist who was involved in the research of lipids and flavors in food, including the development of technology transfer between the United States and Taiwan.

== Early career ==
Born in China, Chang received his B.S. degree in 1941 from the National Jinan University in Shanghai before emigrating to the United States in 1947. He then earned his M.S. degree in organic chemistry in 1949 at Kansas State University and his Ph.D. in food science in 1952 at the University of Illinois at Urbana-Champaign. He married his wife Lucy the same year he earned his Ph.D., and worked several years in the food industry before joining the faculty at Rutgers University in New Brunswick, New Jersey in 1960.

== Rutgers career ==
At Rutgers, Chang eventually rose to the position of Department Chair, where he served from 1977 to 1986. Writing over 100 research papers and earning 15 patents, he retired from teaching in 1988. He was also active in the American Oil Chemists' Society, Chinese American Food Society (CAFS) (President: 1975-6), and the Institute of Food Technologists.

== Retirement ==
After his retirement, Chang worked as a consultant in the food industry and was involved in the successful technology transfer of food science with both China and Taiwan. He and his wife Lucy also established awards in Chang's honor both at the American Oil Chemists Society (AOCS) and the Institute of Food Technologists (IFT).

== Death ==
Chang died in 1996. His papers were donated to the library at Rutgers.

== Honors and awards ==
- AOCS Alton E. Bailey Award - 1974
- AOCS Supelco/Nicholas Pelik - AOCS research - 1979
- AOCS Stephen S. Chang Award - First awarded in 1991
- CAFS Professional Achievement Award - 1983 (First award winner)
- IFT Fellow - 1974
- IFT Nicholas Appert Award - 1983
- IFT International Award - 1989
- IFT Stephen S. Chang Award for Lipid or Flavor Science - First awarded in 1993
- The Chang Science Library was established in 1995 at Rutgers at the first floor of Foran Hall at Cook College to support research in agriculture, aquaculture, food science, ecology, and environmental science.
