= Bernard J. Liska =

American food scientist

Dr. Bernard Liska
- Born: May 31, 1931; Hillsboro, Wisconsin
- Died: November 11, 2002 (aged 71); Houston, Texas
- Education: University of Wisconsin–Madison
- Scientific career
- Fields: Food Science
- Workplaces: University of Florida; Purdue University

Bernard J. Liska (May 31, 1931 – November 11, 2002) was an American food scientist who was involved in the creation of the Food Science Department at Purdue University in West Lafayette, Indiana. He also served as president of the Institute of Food Technologists in 1984–85 and was scientific editor of the Journal of Food Science from 1970 to 1981.

== Early life and career ==
A native of Hillsboro, Wisconsin, Liska earned his B.S., M.S. and Ph.D. degrees from the University of Wisconsin–Madison. After earning his Ph.D., he joined the faculty at the University of Florida as an assistant professor of dairy science before joining Purdue University as an assistant professor of food science in 1959.

== Career at Purdue ==
Liska joined Purdue in 1959, and was named director of the Food Science Institute in 1968. He then became director of the Agriculture Experiment Station in 1975, and dean of the School of Agriculture in 1980. During his tenure as dean, Liska strengthened the basic sciences of the school, before stepping down in 1985. The Department of Food Science was established during Liska's tenure in 1983. He remained at Purdue as professor of food science until his 1997 retirement.

== Research interests ==
Liska's research focused on food chemistry, food microbiology, and sanitation. All told, he would have 95 papers published in ten different journals.

== Professional service ==
Liska was a member of the American Dairy Science Association, American Dietetic Association, and Institute of Food Technologists, among others. His greatest service was with the latter, where he served as president in 1984–85 and was scientific editor of the Journal of Food Science from 1970 to 1981.

== Awards ==
- Fellow – Institute of Food Technologists (1979).
- Certificate of Distinction – Purdue University School of Agriculture (1995).
- Outstanding Food Science Award – Purdue University Department of Food Science (2001).

== Death ==
Liska died in Houston, Texas on November 11, 2002.

== Selected work ==
- McGee, C.E., G.S. Born, J.E. Christian, and B.J. Liska. (1969). "Improved extraction procedure for 2,3,5-trilodobenzoic acid from milk and milk products." Bulletin of Environmental Contamination and Toxicology. 4(5): 306–310.
