= AOCS =

AOCS may refer to:

- American Oil Chemists' Society
- Attitude and Orbit Control Systems, systems used in the control of spacecraft
- Aviation Officer Candidate School
