= Food Technology (magazine) =

Monthly food magazine

- First issue: January 1947; 78 years ago
- Company: Institute of Food Technologists
- Country: United States
- Based in: Chicago
- Language: English
- Website: www.ift.org/news-and-publications/food-technology-magazine
- ISSN: 0015-6639

Food Technology is a monthly food science and technology magazine published by the Institute of Food Technologists (IFT) in Chicago, Illinois. The magazine addresses current issues related to food science and technology, including research, education, food engineering, food packaging, nutraceuticals, laboratory issues, and other items related to IFT. The magazine is free to IFT members as part of their annual dues.

== History ==
=== Early history ===
Before 1946, IFT would publish occasional newsletters and proceedings of papers presented at the annual IFT Meetings from 1940 to 1945. By 1946, the IFT Council (its governing body) decided to publish a monthly journal on the proceedings of the 1946 Annual Meeting. The first issue of Food Technology magazine was published in January 1947 with C. Olin Ball as its editor-in-chief. This journal published both information regarding the food industry along with research papers. The journal would become a monthly publication beginning in 1949, carrying magazine advertisements for the first time. Ball would remain as editor-in-chief until June 1950.

=== Scientific journal in the 1950s ===
Zoltan I. Kertesz would succeed Ball as editor-in-chief in 1950 and hold that position until July 1952. While Kertesz served as editor, IFT would purchase Food Research in 1951 from Garand Press. Martin S. Peterson would succeed Kertesz as editor-in-chief that year and continue in that position until December 1960. During Peterson's tenure, Food Technology would undergo two new logo and cover designs, occurring in June 1953 and August 1957, respectively. During this time, both Kertesz and Peterson would also be Editor-In-Chief of Food Research.

=== Transition to scientific magazine ===
George F. Stewart succeeded Peterson as editor of Food Technology in January 1961. It was also the time that Calvert L. Willey took over as Executive Secretary of IFT. During this time, Stewart and Willey worked together to shift the basic research to the Journal of Food Science (changed from Food Research in 1961). The formatting of Food Technology was changed to publish more feature articles, news, and applied research. Stewart would remain as Executive Editor until July 1966. By this time, Willey had centralized the publications office in Chicago, establishing a Director of Publications with Karl O. Herz. Stewart would be succeeded by Walter M. Urbain as Scientific Editor of Food Technology in May 1966. The magazine would also have a new logo and cover design in June 1969. The final transitions would occur in 1970 and 1971 when John B. Klis succeeded Herz as Publications Director and Editor of Food Technology in April 1970, and when Ernest J. Briskey succeeded Urbain as Scientific Editor in June 1970. Applied research of food science would transfer fully from Food Technology to the Journal of Food Science in January 1971 where they have remained ever since. During this time, Stewart, Urbain, and Briskey would also remain as Editor-In-Chief of the Journal of Food Science as well until 1971.

=== Klis' editorial service ===
Klis saw the magazine's greatest change from 1971 until he stepped down in March 1996. During this time, Food Technology would change its logo and cover design twice, first in January 1977 and then in June 1985. The 1977 change would also show an overview being introduced that highlighted outstanding symposia in food science and technology from the IFT Annual Meeting, a trend that would continue until 1997. Klis would serve until 1996 and would be succeeded by Frances R. Katz in September of that year.

=== Food Technology today ===
Katz would serve as editor from September 1996 to March 2001 when she was succeeded by Neil H. Mermelstein, a member of the Food Technology staff from 1971 to 2007. The magazine has since undergone two changes in its publishing logo and format, the first in June 1997 and the most recent change occurring in July 2005, winning awards for the redesign. Today the magazine presents two to three featured articles, including education, foodservice, product development, and pet food in the most recent issues, and standard articles on laboratory, ingredients, nutraceuticals, food processing, food packaging, and items related to IFT.

== Topics covered over the years ==
Such topics covered by Food Technology since 1947 include quality, food safety, regulation, food law, sensory analysis, food chemistry, food microbiology, food additive, food allergy, education, food labeling regulations, bioterrorism, and obesity.
