= Zoltan I. Kertesz =

Hungarian-American food scientist

Zoltan I. Kertesz (September 2, 1903 – August 1968) was a Hungarian-born American food scientist who was involved in the early development of food microbiology and food chemistry. He was also an active member of the Institute of Food Technologists (IFT).

== Career ==
Kertesz was born in Hungary, but emigrated to the United States where he went to work for the New York State Agricultural Experiment Station (NYSAES), part of Cornell University. It was there he would work on food microbiology and food chemistry. This included improving the grading and quality of canned peas, which was featured in a 1935 Time magazine article.

== IFT involvement ==
An active member of IFT, Kertesz would serve as Editor-In-Chief of Food Technology magazine from July 1950 to July 1952 and of Food Research after IFT purchased the scientific journal from Garand Press in 1951. He would receive the IFT International Award in 1967.

== Other professional involvement ==
Kertesz was also a member of the American Chemical Society.

== Selected articles ==
- Kertesz, Z.I. (1931). "Discharge of saccarase from mycelium of Penicillium Glaccum.". Plant Physiology. 6 (2): 249–64. doi:10.1104/pp.6.2.249. PMC 440091. PMID 16652706.
- Kertesz, Z.I. (1930). "The chemical changes in peas after picking". Plant Physiology. 5 (3): 399–412. doi:10.1104/pp.5.3.399. PMC 440229. PMID 16652669.
- Kertesz, Z.I. (1931). "Method for the estimation of enzyme yield in fungus cultures". Journal of Biological Chemistry. 90 (1): 15–23. doi:10.1016/S0021-9258(18)76656-8.
- Wilson, C.S.; Schaefer, A.E.; Darby, W.J.; et al. (1964). "A review of methods used in nutrition surveys conducted by Interdepartmental Committee on Nutrition for National Defense (ICNND)". American Journal of Clinical Nutrition. 15 (1): 29–44. doi:10.1093/ajcn/15.1.29. PMID 14192744.
