= Bor S. Luh =

American food scientist (1916–2001)

Bor Shium Luh (January 13, 1916 – June 4, 2001) was a Chinese-born American food scientist who was known was for his research in fruit and vegetable products and in developing food science and technology in Asia, Latin America, and the Middle East. He was a noted researcher on the topic of rice research and development.

== Early life and education ==
Born in Shanghai, he earned a Bachelor of Science in chemistry in 1938 at Chiao Tung University, then earned his Master of Science degree in food science (1948) and Doctor of Philosophy degree in agricultural chemistry (1952) both at the University of California, Berkeley.

== Family ==
He was married to Bai Tsain Luh (passed 2010).

== Career ==
Luh joined the University of California, Davis faculty in 1952 as a researcher and lecturer in food chemistry, working his way to professor rank until his 1986 retirement. He would be named a Fellow of the Institute of Food Technologists (IFT) that same year. Luh's career would involve mentoring over 100 graduate students, many of whom would have successful careers of their own.

== Legacy and professional career ==
The UC Davis food science department would dedicate his food chemistry lab as the Bor S. Luh Food Laboratory in May 2001, less than a month prior to his death while visiting in Hilo, Hawaii. Memorials were held in Hawaii and Davis, California on June 8, and June 13, 2001, respectively.

Luh was also active in the Chinese American Food Society being named its first president in 1974-5 and receiving its Professional Achievement award in 1984.

IFT would rename their International Award in his honor starting in 2005.

== Published works ==
- Rice, Volume 2: Utilization

== Notes and references ==
- "Death Notices: Bor Shium Luh." Food Technology. September 2001: p. 16.
