= Maynard A. Joslyn =

American food scientist (1904–1984)

Maynard Alexander Joslyn (July 7, 1904 – November 28, 1984) was a Russian-born American food scientist who involved in the rebirth of the American wine industry in California following the repeal of Prohibition in 1933. Joslyn was also involved in the development of analytical chemistry as it applied to food, leading to the advancement of food chemistry as a scientific discipline.

== Early life ==
Joslyn was born in Alexandrovsk, Russian Empire. Soon after his birth, his family emigrated to the United States and settled in Michigan.

== College life at Berkeley ==
After graduating high school in Michigan, Joslyn enrolled at the University of California, Berkeley where he earned a B.S. in 1926 and a M.S. in 1928. From 1928 to 1931, Joslyn worked in the food industry before returning to Berkeley as an instructor in the "Division of Fruit Products," then an administrative unit in the College of Agriculture. The unit would later be renamed the Department of Food Science and Technology. Joslyn would earn his Doctor of Philosophy in Chemistry in 1935.

== Research at Berkeley ==
Joslyn's research at Berkeley began when he was a graduate student under William V. Cruess in 1926 when their research showed that fruits and vegetables can be preserved by freezing. It would continue to where his research would show the enzymatic changes of foods during food processing and their microbial changes after processing. Joslyn published one of the first books dealing with analytical food chemistry entitled Methods in Food Analysis in 1950 with a second edition coming out in 1970. Joslyn also served as co-editor (with J.L. Held) of a three volume series entitled Food Processing in 1963 and 1964.

Joslyn would also lead the research to rebirth the California wine industry following the end of Prohibition in 1933. This included quality issues with wine, including alcoholic content, and content of unfavorable items in alcohol (acidity, sulfur dioxide, and turbidity). These studies would continue until his retirement from the Department of Nutritional Sciences at Berkeley in 1972 The food science department would move to the University of California, Davis in 1951.

Joslyn also wrote numerous books on fruit and vegetable juices and non-alcoholic beverages as well as food preservation by freezing and dehydration. All told he wrote or co-wrote nearly 400 articles in his career.

== Involvement with the Institute of Food Technologists ==
A charter member of the Institute of Food Technologists (IFT) when it was founded in 1939, Joslyn served as its President in 1965-66. He was also active in IFT's Northern California Section, serving as its chair in 1957-58. Joslyn won three of IFT highest awards during his career: The IFT International Award in 1961, the Babcock-Hart Award in 1963, and the Nicholas Appert Award in 1966. Joslyn also was elected an IFT Fellow in 1972.

== Military service ==
During World War II, Joslyn served in the United States Army Quartermaster Corps in Australia, New Zealand, and China, being discharged as a lieutenant-colonel. For his military service, he earned the Legion of Merit, the Bronze Star, and a special order of Yun Hui with Ribbon from the National Government of the Republic of China.

== Other awards ==
Joslyn won two Diplome d'Honneur (honor diploma) from the French Office International de la Vigne et du Vin (International French Wine and Vineyard Office) in Paris for his books of Table Wines: The Technology of Their Production in California (1951, 1970) and Dessert, Appetizer, and Related Flavored Wines: The Technology of Their Production. (1964). He also earned the Merit Award from the American Society for Enology and Viticulture in 1971.

== Death ==
Joslyn died at a Veterans Administration hospital in Yountville, California on November 28, 1984. He was survived by his wife Golda, a physician of Berkeley, California.
