= Annual Review of Food Science and Technology =

- Discipline: Food Science
- Language: English
- Edited by: D. Julian McClements

Publication details
- History: 2010–present, 16 years old
- Publisher: Annual Reviews (US)
- Frequency: Annually
- Open access: Subscribe to Open
- Impact factor: 15.4 (2025)

Standard abbreviations
- ISO 4: Annu. Rev. Food Sci. Technol.

Indexing
- ISSN: 1941-1413 (print); 1941-1421 (web)

Links
- Journal homepage

The Annual Review of Food Science and Technology is a peer-reviewed scientific journal published by Annual Reviews (AR). It releases an annual volume of review articles relevant to the field of food science. It has been in publication since 2010. The editor is David J. McClements. As of 2023, Annual Review of Food Science and Technology is being published as open access, under the Subscribe to Open model. As of 2026, Journal Citation Reports gives the journal a 2025 impact factor of 15.4, ranking it fourth of 187 journal titles in the category "Food Science & Technology".

== History ==
The Annual Review of Food Science and Technology was first published in 2010 by Annual Reviews (AR), a nonprofit organization whose stated mission is to synthesize knowledge "for the progress of science and the benefit of society." The journal's founding co-editors were Todd R. Klaenhammer and Michael P. Doyle. Following Klaenhammer's retirement, David J. McClements became co-editor in 2019. As of April 2021, McClements is the sole editor. Though it was initially published in print, as of 2021 it is only published electronically. Some of its articles are available online prior to the volume publication date.

== Scope and indexing ==
The Annual Review of Food Science and Technology defines its scope as covering significant developments relevant to food science, inclusive of disciplines such as food microbiology, food rheology, foodborne illness, food engineering, fermentation, nutritional genomics, novel foods, food processing, and food preservation. It is abstracted and indexed in Scopus, Science Citation Index Expanded, Compendex, MEDLINE, and Embase, among others.

== Editorial processes ==
The Annual Review of Food Science and Technology is helmed by the editor or the co-editors. The editor is assisted by the editorial committee, which includes associate editors, regular members, and occasionally guest editors. Guest members participate at the invitation of the editor, and serve terms of one year. All other members of the editorial committee are appointed by the AR board of directors and serve five-year terms. The editorial committee determines which topics should be included in each volume and solicits reviews from qualified authors. Unsolicited manuscripts are not accepted. Peer review of accepted manuscripts is undertaken by the editorial committee.

=== Editors of volumes ===
Dates indicate publication years in which someone was credited as a lead editor or co-editor of a journal volume. The planning process for a volume begins well before the volume appears, so appointment to the position of lead editor generally occurred prior to the first year shown here. An editor who has retired or died may be credited as a lead editor of a volume that they helped to plan, even if it is published after their retirement or death.

- Todd R. Klaenhammer and Michael P. Doyle (2010-2018; Klaenhammer retired in 2015; credited to 2018)
- Doyle and David Julian McClements (2019-2021)
- David Julian McClements (2022-)

=== Current editorial board ===
As of 2022, the editorial committee consists of the editor and the following members:

- Colin Hill
- Anne S. Meyer
- Casimir C. Akoh
- Jozef L. Kokini
- Mary Ann Lila
- Jochen Weiss
- Liangli Yu
