= Emil M. Mrak =

Emil Marcel Mrak

2nd Chancellor of the University of California, Davis
- In office 1959–1969
- Preceded by: Stanley B. Freeborn
- Succeeded by: James Henry Meyer

Personal details
- Born: October 27, 1901 San Francisco, California, U.S.
- Died: April 9, 1987 (aged 85) Davis, California, U.S.
- Education: University of California, Berkeley
- Profession: food scientist, microbiologist
- Awards: Carl R. Fellers Award (1984); Bor S. Luh International Award (1963); Babcock-Hart Award (1961); Nicholas Appert Award (1957)
- Institutions: University of California, Davis

Emil Marcel Mrak (October 27, 1901 – April 9, 1987) was an American food scientist, microbiologist, and second chancellor of the University of California, Davis. He was recognized internationally for his work in food preservation and as a world authority on the biology of yeasts.

== Biography ==
=== Early years ===
Mrak was born in San Francisco, California to a family of Croatian and Hungarian immigrants, raised in the rural orchards of the Santa Clara Valley. He graduated from Campbell High School in Campbell, then went on to receive a B.S. degree in Food Technology in 1926, M.S. degree in 1928, and Ph.D. degree in botany and mycology in 1936 from the University of California, Berkeley. While an undergraduate at Berkeley, Mrak was a member of the Alpha Gamma Rho fraternity.

=== Career ===
Mrak was appointed as an instructor in food technology at UC Berkeley in 1937 and became professor and department chairman in 1948. In 1951, he led the move of the department to its current location at UC Davis, and was later appointed chancellor in 1959. He was the first food scientist to ever be named president or chancellor of a college or university. The only other food scientist to have this honor is James L. Oblinger, chancellor of the North Carolina State University in Raleigh from 2005 to 2009.

Mrak was recommended to UC President Clark Kerr by Harry R. Wellman. Kerr had to bring Mrak before the board three times in order to secure their reluctant approval of his appointment to lead the Davis campus. Upon encountering him, some regents initially thought that Mrak did not "look like a chancellor". However, both the Board of Regents and Kerr came to value Mrak's management skills, as well as his ability to effectively represent the university's interests in nearby Sacramento.

At the time of Mrak's appointment, Davis was still tightly focused on agriculture due to its origins as the University Farm. Mrak successfully developed UC Davis into a general campus offering a rich variety of undergraduate and graduate programs, and he worked hard to turn the campus into a bicycle-friendly environment.

A charter member of the Institute of Food Technologists (IFT) in 1939, Mrak served as its President from 1957 to 1958. He also won numerous awards within IFT, including the Nicholas Appert Award (1957), the Babcock-Hart Award (1961), the International Award (1963), election as a Fellow in 1970, and the Carl R. Fellers Award in 1984. He also served as chair of IFT's Northern California Section in 1947/48. In 1969, Mrak served as chairman of a federal government commission (which became known as the Mrak commission) that recommended restricting the use of the pesticide DDT. He also served as the first chairman of the Environmental Protection Agency's Science Advisory Council under President Richard M. Nixon.

=== Personal life ===
Mrak married Vera Dudley Greaves, a nutritionist, on November 15, 1945. They had two children: Robert Emil Mrak (December 18, 1948) and Antoinette Vera Mrak (July 15, 1951). Mrak died in Davis, California on April 9, 1987. Mrak Hall, the administration office building on the UC Davis campus, is named in his honor. In 1988, UC Davis also established the Emil M. Mrak International Award in his honor.

== Honours and awards ==
- Alpha Gamma Rho Chi Brothers of the Century: 1923
- Alpha Gamma Rho Hall of Fame: 1980
- University of California, Berkeley Alumnus of the Year: 1969

== Students ==
- Herman Phaff

== See also ==
- Mrakia
