= Olive cultivation in Italy =

Olives have been grown in Italy since the 9th millennium BC and are Italy's most commonly grown crop. Over half of Italy's farms and three-quarters of its cropland are used to grow olives. In 2023, Italy was second to Spain as the most prolific producer of olive oil and third to Spain and Greece as the most prolific producer of olives for use in food. Of all the olive oil that Italy, Greece and Spain export into the top 15 importers of olive oil, Italy and Spain produce 96%.

== History ==
William Vere Cruess stated that people in present-day Italy have cultivated and used olives since "the beginning of historical time". A marine core near Italy contained olive pollen that dated to 8500–8000 BC. Olive charcoal, and tools probably used for olive harvesting, have been found in present-day Italy that date back to 5740–5590 BC. Olive fruits were eaten by the Ancient Romans and used as medicine and in rituals; the olive tree's wood was burnt for fuel. The Early Empire was probably the period at which the number of olive cultivation groves was at its highest in Rome, though the Late Republic had at least 200 installations. The centrifugal olive press was invented in the 1970s and, by the 21st century, pressed the majority of Italy's olive oil.

== Works cited ==
- Cruess, W. V. (William Vere) (1924). The preparation and refining of olive oil in southern Europe. Berkeley, Calif. : University of California, College of Agriculture, Agricultural Experiment Station.
- Angus, Julie (2014). Olive odyssey : searching for the secrets of the fruit that seduced the world. Vancouver : Greystone Books Ltd. ISBN 978-1-55365-514-5.
