= David J. McClements =

British food scientist

- Born: England
- Education: University of Leeds
- Partner: Jayne Farrell
- Children: Isobelle Farrell McClements
- Scientific career
- Institutions: University of Massachusetts Amherst; King Abdulaziz University; Zhejiang Gongshang University

David Julian McClements is a British food scientist who is a distinguished professor at the University of Massachusetts Amherst Department of Food Science. He is an elected fellow of the Royal Society of Chemistry, American Chemical Society, and Institute of Food Technologists, as well as the editor of the Annual Review of Food Science and Technology.

== Early life and education ==
David Julian McClements was born in northern England. He graduated from the University of Leeds with a bachelor's degree in 1985 and a PhD in food science in 1989. Following his PhD, he had postdoctoral research appointments at the University of Leeds, University of California, Davis, and University College Cork.

== Career ==
David J. McClements was hired as an assistant professor at the University of Massachusetts Amherst in 1994. He was promoted to associate professor in 2000 and full professor in 2005. From 2014 to 2016 he was an adjunct professor at King Abdulaziz University in Saudi Arabia; he became a visiting professor at Harvard University in 2016 and an adjunct at Zhejiang Gongshang University in 2019. He was named a distinguished professor at UMass Amherst in 2016 in its Department of Food Science.

McClements researches the structure of colloids, the functionality of biopolymers, use of nanotechnology in foods, and the bioactivity of nutraceuticals. One of his areas of research is the development of textured non-meat products with a similar taste and texture to real meat.

McClements became a co-editor of the Annual Review of Food Science and Technology with Michael P. Doyle as of 2019. As of April 2021, he became the sole editor of the Annual Review of Food Science and Technology.

He is the most cited author in numerous journals in the field of food science: Journal of Agricultural and Food Chemistry, Food Chemistry, Journal of Food Science, Food Research International, Food Hydrocolloids, Food & Function, Critical Reviews in Food Science and Nutrition, Food Biophysics, Annual Review of Food Science and Technology.

== Awards and honours ==
In 2014 he was elected as a fellow of the Royal Society of Chemistry. He was elected as a fellow to both the American Chemical Society and Institute of Food Technologists in 2015. In 2019 he received the Nicolas Appert Award from the Institute of Food Technologists.

== Personal life ==
He is married to Jayne Farrell and they have one daughter, Izzy.
