= Stephen S. Chang Award for Lipid or Flavor Science =

The Stephen S. Chang Award for Lipid or Flavor Science has been awarded every year since 1993. It is awarded to a member of the Institute of Food Technologists (IFT) who has made significant contributions to lipid or flavor science. This award is named for Stephen S. Chang (1918-1996), a Chinese-born food scientist who later became a food science professor at Rutgers University in New Brunswick, New Jersey specializing in lipid and flavor research. It was the second IFT award to be named for a living person.

Award winners receive a USD 3000 honorarium and a Steuben crystal from the Stephen S. Chang Endowment Fund supported by the Taiwan Food Industries (SSC).

== Winners ==
Year	Winner
1993	Edward G. Perkins
1994	Gary A. Reineccius
1995	David B. Min
1996	Wassef W. Nawar
1997	John M. deMan
1998	Robert C. Lindsay
1999	W. James Harper
2000	Terry E. Acree
2001	Michael M. Blumenthal
2002	Chi-Tang Ho
2003	Gary R. List
2004	Herbert O. Hultin
2005	Fereidoon Shahidi
2006	Eric A. Decker
2007	Keith R. Cadwallader
2008	Casimir C. Akoh
2009	Pamela White
2010	Cameron Faustman
