= Fred W. Tanner =

American food scientist and microbiologist

Fred Wilbur Tanner (1888–1957) was an American food scientist and microbiologist who involved in the founding of the Institute of Food Technologists (IFT) and the creation of the scientific journal Food Research (now the Journal of Food Science (JFS).).

== Academic career ==
Tanner joined at the University of Illinois at Urbana-Champaign in 1923, where he was chair of the Bacteriology Department (now Department of Microbiology) until 1948. His work focused on food safety issues, specifically pasteurization and meat curing. Tanner remained as professor until his retirement in 1956. Tanner's research in food science and technology would also lead to the establishment of the food technology department at Illinois in 1947.

== Role with IFT ==
Tanner was a presenter at a 1937 conference with Samuel Cate Prescott of the Massachusetts Institute of Technology (MIT) held at MIT on "Microorganisms in Relation to Food Processing." A year earlier, Tanner founded the scientific journal Food Research, now JFS., where he would remain as Editor-In-Chief until 1951.

He served as IFT President in 1945-46 and would win the Stephen M. Babcock Award (now Babcock-Hart Award) in 1952.

== Death and legacy ==
Tanner died in 1957. The IFT Chicago Section would establish the Fred W. Tanner Lectureship in 1960 that is held every May. This lectureship is given by leaders in the food industry.

Tanner was also posthumously awarded the Pasteur Award and honorary medallion in 1959.

== Selected works ==
- Prescott, S.C. and F.W. Tanner. (1938). "Microbiology in Relation to Food Preservation." Food Research. 3(3): 189-97.
- Tanner, F.W. and G.I. Wallace. (1925). "Relation of Temperature to the Growth of Thermophilic Bacteria." Journal of Bacteriology. 10(5): 421-437.
