= ASEV =

ASEV may refer to:

- American Society for Enology and Viticulture, an American trade association
- The Aegis system equipped vessels (ASEV), a Japanese naval ship classification
