= Benjamin A. Borenstein =

American food scientist (1928–2006)

Benjamin Borenstein
- Born: November 5, 1928
- Died: September 7, 2006 (aged 77)
- Awards: Babcock-Hart Award (1996)
- Scientific career
- Fields: Food Science
- Workplaces: Hoffman-La Roche; Rutgers University

Benjamin Borenstein (November 5, 1928 – September 7, 2006) was an American food scientist who was involved in vitamin fortification.

Employed with Hoffman-La Roche until his 1987 retirement, Borenstein played a key role in fortifying vitamins. He also served as an adjunct professor, and late honorary professor, at Rutgers University in New Brunswick, New Jersey.

An active member of the Institute of Food Technologists (IFT), Borenstein was named a fellow in 1979. He won the Babcock-Hart Award 1996.

Borenstein retired to Delray Beach, Florida, with his wife Blanche. He died on September 7, 2006, of Parkinson's disease.
