= Fred Shank =

American nutritionist (1940–2015)

Fred Ross Shank II (October 11, 1940 – January 24, 2015) was the Director of the Center for Food Safety and Applied Nutrition of the Food and Drug Administration for nearly ten years before he became Senior Advisor to the Commissioner for External Academic Affairs in January 1998. Before joining FDA in 1978, Shank performed program evaluations and served as a nutrition specialist with the Food and Nutrition Service for domestic food assistance programs at the U.S. Department of Agriculture. Shank earned his doctorate in nutrition at the University of Maryland, College Park. He has authored or co-authored numerous papers and has made many presentation on public health, nutrition and food safety. His best known work was the implementation of the Nutrition Labeling and Education Act in 1990. In 1994, he was the recipient of the Babcock-Hart Award.

Shank was elected a fellow of the Institute of Food Technologists (IFT) in 1991, then later joined IFT in managing their Washington, D.C. office. Shank retired from IFT as a Vice President of Science, Communications, and Government Relations in 2010.

He received his B.S. at the University of Kentucky and his PhD in nutrition from the University of Maryland, College Park.
