= Walter M. Urbain =

American food scientist

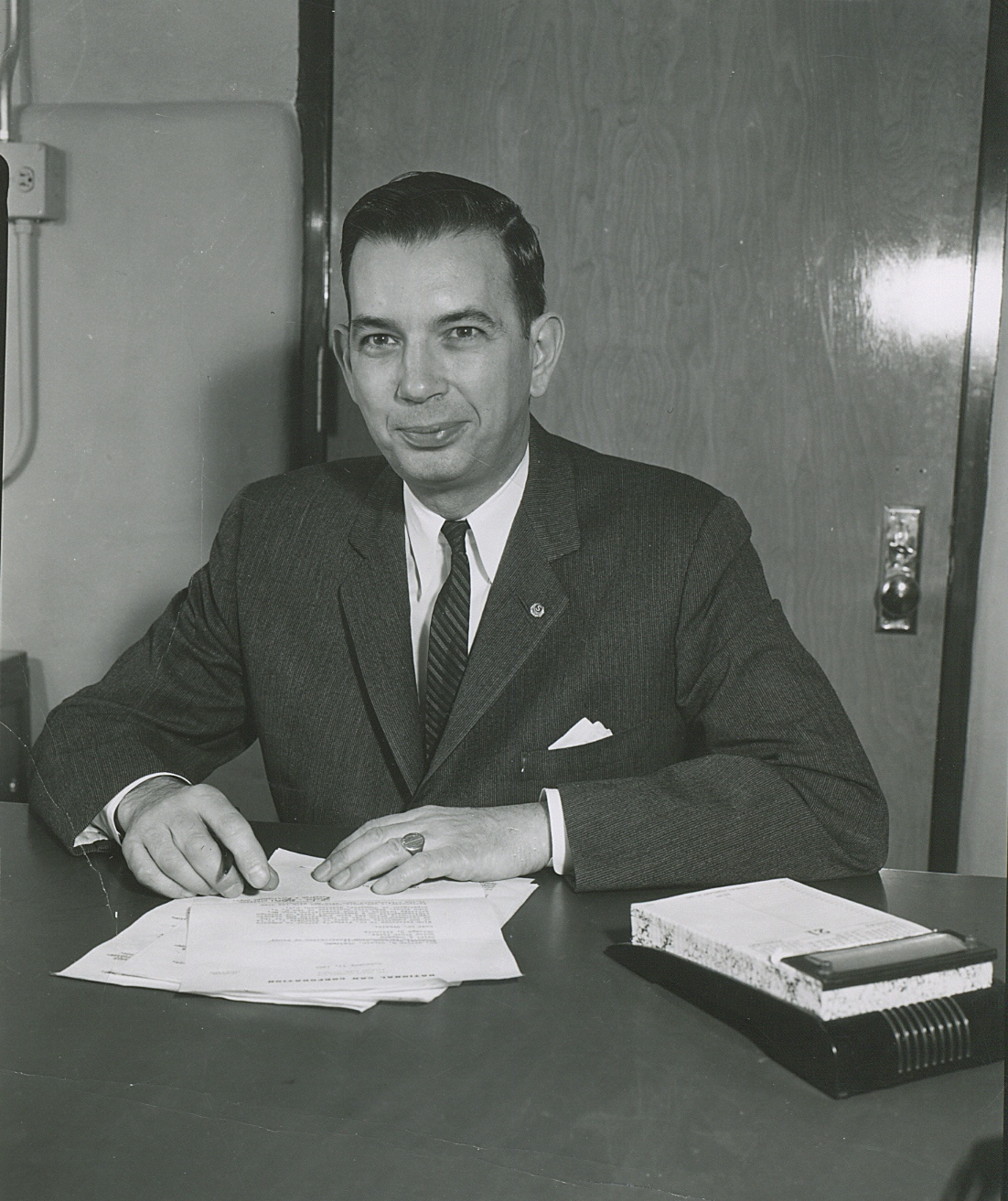
Walter M Urbain.

Walter Mathias Urbain (1910 – January 15, 2002) was a distinguished American scientist who helped pioneer food science through innovative research during World War II. His contributions include new patents and methodologies in food engineering, irradiation, and meat science. Because of his contributions, the US government, especially the US Army and the former US Atomic Energy Commission, developed national programs on food irradiation during the 1950s which led to the development of international standards and the application of his methods on a global basis.

== Career ==
Urbain graduated Phi Beta Kappa from the University of Chicago in 1934, earning his Doctorate (PhD) in Chemistry. After obtaining his degree, he joined Swift & Company where he became head (Director) of Engineering Research. In 1966 he joined Michigan State University where he taught physics and chemistry, and also focused his research on food irradiation.

Urbain's breakthrough findings led him to the forefront of food science, consulting on projects for the US government and acting as lead consultant to the International Atomic Energy Agency (IAEA) in Vienna, Austria. Dr. Urbain also helped kick start the food irradiation program at the United Nations, namely the Food and Agriculture Organization (FAO) and World Health Organization (WHO). Dr Urbain became Director of the first FAO/IAEA International Training Course on Food Irradiation and Techniques which led to the creation of an International Training Manual on Food Irradiation Technology and Techniques in 1968 as well as an international certification program labelled the "Food Irradiation Process Control School".

The success of food irradiation today is a result of Walter Urbain's dedication and determination on this subject. Urbain's many honors include, the Outstanding Civilian Service Award from the U.S. Army in 1962 as well as the Industrial Achievement Award from The Institute of Food Technologists in 1963 and the "International Food Engineering Award" in 1976.

Outside of his duties, Urbain played a significant role in several scientific organizations including the American Chemical Society, the American Society of Agricultural and Biological Engineers (American Society of Agricultural Engineers: 1907–2005), and the Institute of Food Technologists where he was a Chartered Member. Numerous patents are registered in his name; he published 36 scientific papers, wrote hundreds of articles and published two books on food irradiation.

== Death ==
At the age of 91, Urbain died from a brief illness in Dallas, Texas on January 15, 2002.

== Professional activities ==
- American Chemical Society: Chair of the Chicago, Illinois section - 1949.
- American Society of Agricultural and Biological Engineers: FPSA-FPEI Food Engineering Award - 1976.
- Institute of Food Technologists:
  - Editor-In-Chief of Journal of Food Science and Scientific Editor of Food Technology - May 1966 to June 1970.
  - Fellow - 1970, among the first class of 27 fellows inducted.
