= Martin S. Peterson =

American food scientist

Martin S. Peterson was an American food scientist who was involved in food irradiation, food supplies for the United States military, and in confectionery products development. He also served as Editor-In-Chief of Food Technology and the scientific journal Food Research during the 1950s for the Institute of Food Technologists.

== Selected works ==
- Harris, N., M.S. Peterson, and S.D. Crespo. (1991). A Formulary of Candy Products. CHS Press.
- Josephson, E.S., S, and M.S. Peterson. (1983). Preservation of Food by Ionizing Radiation. Boca Raton, Florida: CRC Press, Inc.
- Peterson, M.S. (1970). Proceedings Symposium Feeding the Military Man. Natick, Massachusetts: United States Army Natick Laboratories.
- Peterson, M.S. (1961). Scientific Thinking and Scientific Writing. New York: Reinhold Publishing Corp.
- Peterson, M.S. and D.K. Tressler. (Year of publication missing). Food Technology: The World Over. New York: AVI Publishing Company.
