= Journal of the American Oil Chemists' Society =

- Discipline: Biochemistry
- Language: English
- Edited by: James A Kenar

Publication details
- Former name(s): Oil and Soap
- History: 1924-present
- Publisher: Wiley (United States)
- Frequency: Monthly
- Impact factor: 1.541 (2014)

Standard abbreviations
- ISO 4: J. Am. Oil Chem.' Soc.

Indexing
- ISSN: 0003-021X (print); 1558-9331 (web)

Links
- Journal homepage

The Journal of the American Oil Chemists' Society is a peer-reviewed scientific journal published by Wiley and the American Oil Chemists' Society. The journal publishes original research articles, letters, and invited reviews in the area of science and technology of oils, fats, oilseed proteins, and related materials.

== Impact factor ==
The Journal of the American Oil Chemists' Society has a 2014 impact factor of 1.541

== Editor ==
The editor in chief of the journal is Richard W. Hartel (University of Wisconsin).

== Abstracting and indexing ==
- Science Citation Index
- Journal Citation Reports / Science Edition,
- Current Contents / Agriculture, Biology & Environmental Sciences
- Scopus
- Inspec
- Chemical Abstracts Service
- CSA Illumina
- CAB International
- Academic OneFile
- AGRICOLA
- Biochemistry and Biophysics Citation Index
- Biological Abstracts
- BIOSIS Previews
- Business Source
- CAB Abstracts
- Chimica
- Engineering Index / Compendex
- Food Science and Technology Abstracts
- Global Health
- INIS / Atomindex
- OmniFile
- PASCAL
- Reaction Citation Index
- Reaxys
- Summon by Serial Solutions
