= Journal of Food Science =

- Discipline: Food science
- Language: English
- Edited by: Richard W. Hartel

Publication details
- History: 1936–present
- Publisher: Institute of Food Technologists (United States)
- Impact factor: 3.167 (2020)

Standard abbreviations
- ISO 4: J. Food Sci.

Indexing
- CODEN: JFDSAZ
- ISSN: 0022-1147 (print); 1750-3841 (web)
- LCCN: a39000649
- OCLC no.: 01680911

Links
- Journal homepage; Online access

The Journal of Food Science is a peer-reviewed scientific journal that was established in 1936 and is published by John Wiley & Sons on behalf of the Institute of Food Technologists in Chicago, Illinois. From 1996 to 2005, it was ranked eighth among impact in scientific journals publishing food science and technology.

== History ==
The journal was founded in 1936 as Food Research with Fred W. Tanner (University of Illinois at Urbana–Champaign) as editor in chief. Published bimonthly by Garrard Press, it was a publication that dealt with food science and technology research. The first issue had nine articles in it. By the end of 1936, 55 papers were published.

In 1950, Food Research was purchased by the Institute of Food Technologists and Zoltan I. Kertesz was named Editor-In-Chief in 1951. Kertesz and most of his successors also served as editors of Food Technology, the institute's magazine founded in 1947. He was replaced by Martin S. Peterson in July 1952, who served until December 1960.

George F. Stewart (University of California, Davis) took over in January 1961, renaming Food Research to it current name. He was succeeded by Walter M. Urbain in July 1966. Ernest J. Briskey edited from June 1970 until January 1971.

In January 1971, all of the applied research articles were shifted from Food Technology to the Journal of Food Science and Bernard J. Liska became editor-in-chief until 1981. He was succeeded by Aaron E. Wasserman who stepped down in 1990.

== Editors ==
Robert E. Berry became editor-in-chief in 1990 and stayed until 1998. From 1996 the journal was sectioned by discipline (food chemistry, food engineering, food microbiology, nutrition, and sensory analysis). Subsequently, Owen R. Fennema was editor until September 2003, during which time the journal's publication frequency increased from six issues a year to its current nine issues. The current Editor-in-Chief of JFS is Edward Allen Foegeding, a distinguished professor of food chemistry at North Carolina State University though he will step down from that role at the end of 2020 after having served since 2012. Richard W. Hartel of the University of Wisconsin will take over starting in January 2021. Since 2007, the entire journal from its 1936 beginnings can be accessed online.

== See also ==
- Food Research International
