= Richard Mattes =

American nutrition scientist

Richard D. Mattes
- Education: University of Michigan, Cornell University
- Awards: Babcock-Hart Award
- Scientific career
- Fields: Nutrition science
- Workplaces: Purdue University
- Thesis: Salt taste responsiveness and preference among normotensive, pre-hypertensive and hypertensive adults (1981)

Richard D. Mattes is an American nutrition scientist and distinguished professor in the department of nutrition science at Purdue University in West Lafayette, Indiana. He has been described as one of America's leading nutrition scientists.

== Education ==
Mattes received his B.S. in biology from the University of Michigan in 1975, his M.P.H. in public health nutrition at the University of Michigan School of Public Health in 1978, and his Ph.D. from Cornell University in human nutrition in 1981.

== Research ==
In 2007, Mattes co-authored a study which found that people who consumed caloric beverages did not compensate for the calories in them as much as people who consumed solid food. In 2015, he published a study reporting that the taste of fat deserved to be considered another basic taste, alongside sweet, sour, salty, bitter and umami. Mattes and his co-authors coined the term "oleogustus" to describe this taste. As of 2013, Mattes was also working on researching the health effects of nuts, with the aim of determining whether they can remain appealing as a substitute for other snacks.
