= Larry R. Beuchat =

Food protection researcher

Larry R. Beuchat (born July 23, 1943) is a food protection researcher and emeritus professor at the University of Georgia in Griffin, Georgia. Beuchat's work focuses on the microbiology of plant-based foods, molds and pathogens, and food safety. He has authored five books and 530 journal articles. In 2008, the International Association for Food Protection (IAFP) recognized Beuchat's contributions to research by creating the annual Larry Beuchat Young Research Award. In 2013, Beuchat gave Penn State University a gift of $1 million to create an endowed chair in his name for a Professorship in Food Microbiology.

== Early life and education ==
Born in 1943, Larry R. Beuchat was raised by Ella Jayne (d. May 6, 2019) and Raphael Beuchat (d. April 1, 2014) in Guys Mills, Pennsylvania. He graduated from Penn State University in 1965 with an undergraduate degree from the College of Agricultural Sciences. He attributes his education at Penn State as inspiring him to pursue a career as a food science researcher. He completed master's and doctoral degrees from Michigan State University.

== Career ==
Beuchat's career as a researcher began at Quaker Oats, but his work as an academic began at the University of Georgia. According to Penn State, he was the third most-cited agricultural scientist in 2005. At the University of Georgia, Beuchat has focused on the microbiology of plant-based foods, molds and pathogens, and food safety. He has authored five books and 530 journal articles. Beuchat has received many recognitions and awards. In 2001 he received the Partners in Public Health Award from the Centers for Disease Control and Prevention for his work on Salmonella outbreaks associated with raw tomatoes. In 2002, the Department of Food Science at Penn State University honored him with the "Outstanding Alumni" award for his research and service. In 2008, International Association for Food Protection (IAFP) recognized Beuchat's contributions to research by creating the annual Larry Beuchat Young Research Award. In 2019 Beuchat received the Maurice Weber Laboratorian Award from IAFP.

== Selected publications ==
- Beuchat, L. R. (2001). Traditional fermented foods. In: Food Microbiology: Fundamentals and Frontiers, 2nd edition. (M. P. Doyle, L. R. Beuchat and T. J. Montville, ed.) Am. Soc. Microbiology, Washington, D.C. pp. 701-719.
- Beuchat, L. R., & Ryu, J. H. (1997). Produce handling and processing practices. Emerging Infectious Diseases, 3(4), 459–465.
- Deak, T. and L. R. Beuchat. (1996). Handbook of Food Spoilage Yeasts. CRC Press, Inc., Boca Raton, FL. 210 pp.
- Beuchat, L. R. (1996). Pathogenic Microorganisms Associated with Fresh Produce. Journal of Food Protection, 59(2), 204–216. https://doi.org/10.4315/0362-028X-59.2.204
- Beuchat, L.R. (1977). Functional and electrophoretic characteristics of succinylated peanut flour protein. Journal of Agricultural and Food Chemistry.
