= Chi-Tang Ho =

American food scientist (born 1944)

Chi-Tang Ho (Chinese: 何其儻; born 1944) is a Chinese-born Taiwanese-American food scientist. He received his PhD in organic chemistry in 1974 and started working as a researcher and professor in the food science department at Rutgers University. He is now director of the food science graduate program at Rutgers University in New Brunswick, New Jersey.

== Accomplishments ==
Ho has written over 400 journal articles and 140 book chapters on different topics related to science and nutrition. Additionally he has edited 30 scientific books and received seven U.S. patents related to nutrition. He has been an associate editor for the Journal of Food Science, and served on the editorial boards of many food and nutrition journals. He is currently the senior editor at Molecular Nutrition and Food Research. Since 2000, Ho has been an honorary professor at universities in China.--currently, at the Southern Yangtze University in Wuxi, China.

== Education and professional experience ==
BS, Chemistry, National Taiwan University; MA, Organic Chemistry, Washington University in St. Louis; PhD, Organic Chemistry, Washington University in St. Louis

== Awards ==
- Fellow, The American Chemical Society (2010)
- Elected Fellow, The International Academy of Food Science and Technology (2006)
- ACS Award for the Advancement of Application of Agricultural and Food Chemistry: American Chemical Society (2005)
- Institute of Food Technologists (IFT) Stephen S. Chang Award for Lipid or Flavor Science (2002)
- IFT Fellow (2003)
- Board of Trustees Award for Excellence in Research at Rutgers, The State University of New Jersey: Rutgers University
- Cited as “Highly Cited Researcher” in Agricultural Sciences: Institute for Scientific Information
- Spotlight Award for Research Excellence: Cook College, Rutgers University
- Fellow Award: Agricultural and Food Chemistry Division, American Chemical Society (ACS)
- American Chemical Society Newsmaker for Research in an ACS Journal Award
- Distinguished Service Award: Agricultural and Food Chemistry Division, American Chemical Society
- Platinum Award: Agricultural and Food Chemistry Division, American Chemical Society, 1994 & 1995
