= Todd R. Klaenhammer =

American researcher (1951–2021)

- Born: October 30, 1951; Maplewood, Minnesota
- Died: March 6, 2021 (aged 69); Raleigh, North Carolina
- Education: University of Minnesota
- Partner: Amy née Jenewein
- Children: 1
- Scientific career
- Institutions: North Carolina State University

Todd Robert Klaenhammer (October 30, 1951 – March 6, 2021) was an American food scientist and microbiologist who spent his 40-year career at North Carolina State University researching lactic acid bacteria. He was elected as a member of the National Academy of Sciences in 2001, the first food scientist to achieve that honor.

== Early life and education ==
Todd Robert Klaenhammer was born on October 30, 1951 in Maplewood, Minnesota, which is on the outskirts of Saint Paul. His parents were Robert and Eleanor Klaenhammer. Robert was a fire marshal who died in a work-related traffic accident when Todd was fifteen years old; Todd used the resulting Social Security Survivor money to pay for his undergraduate degree in microbiology at the University of Minnesota. During his summer breaks he worked as a gas station clerk and as mail carrier for the United States Postal Service. He graduated with his bachelor's degree in 1973, staying on at UMN for a master's degree (1975) and PhD (1978) in food science under the advisorship of Larry McKay.

== Career ==
Todd R. Klaenhammer accepted a position as assistant professor at North Carolina State University in 1978, working with Marvin L. Speck. He was later promoted to a named professorship, the William Neal Reynolds Distinguished Professor of Food Science, Microbiology, and Genetics. He retired in 2017.

Some of his major research foci include lactic acid bacteria and their associated bacteriophages. His research resulted in the DNA sequencing of commercially beneficial lactic acid bacteria, including the full genomes of Lactobacillus acidophilus and Lactobacillus gasseri. He also developed tools for genetically modifying these strains of bacteria. He was the founding editor of the Annual Review of Food Science and Technology in 2010 and remained co-editor with Michael P. Doyle through 2015.

== Awards and honors ==
In 2001 he was elected into the National Academy of Sciences in the "Plant, Soil, and Microbial Sciences" section, the first food scientist to achieve that honor. In 2015, he had an endowed professorship created in his honor, the Todd R. Klaenhammer Distinguished Professorship in Probiotics Research. He is also an elected fellow of the American Association for the Advancement of Science, American Academy of Microbiology, Institute of Food Technologists, and American Dairy Science Association. He is a recipient of a Borden award from the American Dairy Science Association and a Nicolas Appert Award from the Institute of Food Technologists; both are the highest awards given by the respective organizations.

== Personal life and death ==
He began dating Amy Jenewein in the late 1960s, and they later married. They had one daughter, Ellen. He died on March 6, 2021, at the age of 69.
