= American Journal of Enology and Viticulture =

- Discipline: Enology, viticulture
- Language: English
- Edited by: Dr. Markus Keller

Publication details
- History: 1950-present
- Publisher: American Society for Enology and Viticulture (United States)
- Frequency: Continuous
- Impact factor: 2.2 (2025)

Standard abbreviations
- ISO 4: Am. J. Enol. Vitic.

Indexing
- CODEN: AJEVAC
- ISSN: 0002-9254

Links
- Journal homepage; Online archives

The American Journal of Enology and Viticulture (AJEV) is the official journal of the American Society for Enology and Viticulture (ASEV) and is dedicated to scientific research on winemaking and grapegrowing. The journal is published quarterly, featuring research papers, technical briefs, and literature reviews relating to viticulture. All published papers are peer-reviewed, and publication is not limited to members of ASEV. According to the Clarivate Journal Citation Reports 2026, AJEV has a 2025 impact factor of 2.2.

AJEV was first published in 1950 as a single proceedings volume by the American Society of Enologists, founded by a group of University of California researchers and California winemakers, with further yearly proceedings published in 1951 to 1953. In 1954, the first issue of the American Journal of Enology was published and in 1955, quarterly publication began. The Journal was renamed the American Journal of Enology and Viticulture in 1966. The Society was renamed the American Society for Enology and Viticulture in 1984.

In January 2025 the journal transitioned to open access publishing, with any content published after the 1 January 2025 being available to the public. Articles are published under the Creative Commons Attribution (CC BY) license.
