= Keith H. Steinkraus =

Keith H. Steinkraus (1918–2007) was an American food scientist who was well known in food fermentation which led to the growth of soy-based foods. He also was involved in bacterial diseases used in the control of European chafer and Japanese beetles in New York state.

== Career ==
A native of Minnesota, Steinkraus graduated cum laude (B.A.) from the University of Minnesota in 1939 and earned his Ph.D. in microbiology from Iowa State University in 1951. He would stay at Iowa State for one year before joining Cornell University and the New York State Agricultural Experiment Station (NYSAES) in 1952. He was promoted to full professor in 1962 at Cornell and NYSAES and retired as professor emeritus in 1988, although he remained active in his field and at Cornell for many years afterward.

During his career, Steinkraus's research would focus on the microbial, chemical, and nutritional changes occurring in fermented foods. At Cornell, the experience of mentoring students who had come from Asia, Central America and Africa to study the microbiology of their native foods prompted Steinkraus to study fermented foods, including tempeh, soy sauce, soy milk, tape, trahanas, idli/dosa and the fermented fish sauces (List of fish sauces; List of fish pastes)and soy products of the Far East, including miso and tofu.

He was the first researcher to obtain sporulation of Bacillus popillae in a fermentation medium.

He published over 180 scientific papers, edited three books, and earned seven patents. His "Handbook of Indigenous Fermented Foods," published in 1983, was the first comprehensive and authoritative book on the subject.

After his retirement from Cornell, Steinkraus acted as a consulting microbiologist worldwide, especially in Asia.

== Honors and awards ==
- American Association for the Advancement of Science Fellow.
- American Academy of Microbiology Fellow.
- Institute of Food Technologists (IFT) International Award - 1985.
- IFT Fellow - 1987.
- International Academy of Food Science and Technology Charter Fellow - 1999.

== Selected work ==
- Steinkraus, K.H. (2004). Industrialization of Indigenous Fermented Foods, Second Edition. Boca Raton, Florida: CRC Press.
