= Standard components (food processing) =

Standard components is a food technology term, when manufacturers buy in a standard component they would use a pre-made product in the production of their food. They help products to be the same in consistency, they are quick and easy to use in batch production of food products. Some examples are pre-made stock cubes, marzipan, icing, ready made pastry.

== Usage ==
Manufacturers use standard components as they save time and sometimes cost a lot less and it also helps with consistency in products. If a manufacturer is to use a standard component from another supplier it is essential that a precise and accurate specification is produced by the manufacturer so that the component meets the standards set by the manufacturer.

=== Advantages ===
- Saves preparation time.
- Fewer steps in the production process
- Less effort and skill required by staff
- Less machinery and equipment needed
- Good quality
- Saves money from all aspects
- Can be bought in bulk
- High-quality consistency
- Food preparation is hygienic

=== Disadvantages ===
- Have to rely on other manufacturers to supply products
- Fresh ingredients may taste better
- May require special storage conditions
- Less reliable than doing it yourself
- Cost more to make
- Can't control the nutritional value of the product
- There is a larger risk of cross contamination.
- GCSE food technology
