= Bernard L. Oser =

Bernard L. Oser (1899 – January 21, 1995) was an American biochemist and food scientist who was involved in vitamin analysis.

== Education and early career ==
Oser received his Ph.D. at Fordham University in 1927. Prior to receiving his doctorate, he worked during 1920–21 at Jefferson Medical College as an assistant in physiological chemistry and then worked from 1922 until 1926 as a biochemist at Philadelphia General Hospital (both in Pennsylvania).

== Later career and research ==
Oser then went to work at Food and Drug Research Laboratories, Inc. in Waverly, New York, then known as the Food Research Labs. Inc., from 1926 to 1957 as an assistant director to the vice president. He then served as president of the Chemistry Board from 1959 to 1974 before forming his own consulting firm, Bernard L. Oser & Associates from 1974 to 1995. Oser also served as adjunct professor at Columbia University from 1959 to 1971 as well. His research during this time focused on biological and chemical assays on vitamins, proteins, and other nutrient; pharmaceutical vitamin fortification, stabilization, and availability; toxicology and safety evaluation of food additives, drugs, pesticides, and related chemicals; and the scientific aspects of food law and regulations.

== Role in the Institute of Food Technologists (IFT) ==
A charter member of IFT when it was founded in 1939, Oser received the Babcock-Hart Award in 1958 and would be named an IFT Fellow in 1975. He also served as president in 1968–69.

== Other activities ==
Oser was also active in the Flavor and Extract Manufacturers Association and served on their Expert Panel during his career.

== Death and legacy ==
Oser died in 1995, the last surviving charter member of IFT. In 2000, the first Bernard L. Oser Award was presented to honor others involved in contributions to food ingredient safety or for leadership in establishing principles for food safety evaluation or regulation.
