= Fereidoon Shahidi =

Fereidoon Shahidi is a university research professor at Memorial University of Newfoundland in Canada.

Shahidi is the author of over 1,000 research papers and book chapters, has also authored or edited 78 books. His research contributions have led to several industrial developments worldwide. Shahidi’s current research interests include different areas of nutraceuticals and functional foods, natural antioxidants, marine foods and aquaculture. Shahidi served as the editor-in-chief of the Journal of Functional Foods, Journal of Food Lipids, an editor of Food Chemistry as well as an editorial board member of a number of journals, including the Journal of Food Science, Journal of Agricultural and Food Chemistry, Nutraceuticals and Food, International Journal of Food Properties, Current Nutrition and Food Science and Inform. Shahidi has received numerous awards, including the 2005 Stephen Chang Award from the Institute of Food Technologists, for his outstanding contributions to science and technology. Between 1996 and 2006, Shahidi was the most published and most frequently cited scientist in the area of food, nutrition, and agricultural science as listed by the ISI.
