= Connie M. Weaver =

American nutrition scientist

Connie Marie Weaver is an American nutrition scientist known for her research on mineral metabolism, calcium bioavailability, and bone health. She is a Distinguished Research Professor in the School of Exercise and Nutrition Science at San Diego State University (SDSU) and a Distinguished Professor Emerita in the Department of Nutrition Science at Purdue University and a member of the National Academy of Medicine. She received the Babcock-Hart Award in 1997.

Her work has contributed to an understanding of dietary calcium requirements and approaches to supporting bone health throughout the lifespan. In 2017, her Camp DASH child nutrition study ended early after allegations that the participants had abused and assaulted each other whilst staying on-site for the study.

== Education and career ==
Weaver earned her Bachelor of Science and Master of Science in food and nutrition from Oregon State University and her Ph.D. in nutrition from Florida State University. Her early training in mineral metabolism laid the foundation for her lifelong research focus on calcium physiology and dietary assessment methods.

Weaver began her academic career in 1973 as a teaching assistant in the Department of Foods and Nutrition at Oregon State University, where she completed her undergraduate studies. In 1974, she served as an instructor at Grossmont College in El Cajon, California, before joining the University of Rhode Island as a research associate in the Department of Food and Resource Chemistry in 1975. From 1975 to 1977, she was a teaching and research assistant in the Department of Foods and Nutrition at Florida State University, where she also held appointments as an adjunct faculty member and later as a teaching assistant in chemistry, teaching undergraduate courses in radiochemical techniques.

Weaver joined Purdue University in 1978 as an assistant professor in the Department of Foods and Nutrition, marking the beginning of a distinguished academic career spanning more than four decades. She was promoted to associate professor in 1984 and to full professor in 1988, the same year she was named a Kraft, Inc. Research Fellow. In 1991, she was appointed head of the Department of Nutrition Science (formerly Foods and Nutrition), a position she held until 2016.

Weaver received a courtesy appointment in the Department of Food Science in 1996 and was named Distinguished Professor of Nutrition Science in 2000. That same year, she became Director of the NIH Botanicals Center for Age-Related Diseases, a role she held until 2011. In addition to her departmental leadership, she was appointed Deputy Director of the NIH-funded Indiana Clinical and Translational Science Institute in 2008 and Co-Director of the International Breast Cancer and Nutrition Project in 2010.

In 2011, Weaver founded and became Director of the Women’s Global Health Institute (WGHI) at Purdue University, the nation’s first research institute focused on preventive health for women. She also served as Associate Director of the Indiana Core Center for Clinical Research in Musculoskeletal Disorders (ICCCR) beginning in 2017 and took a sabbatical that same year at Pennsylvania State University to continue collaborative research in bone and mineral metabolism.

Weaver is a member of the National Academy of Medicine and has continued to serve in leadership capacities within federally funded research initiatives. She is the SDSU Principal Investigator for the NIH funded The San Diego Regional Network for Kidney, Urologic, and Hematologic Research Training partnering with the University of California San Diego and Scripps Research Institute.

== Research and contributions ==
Weaver’s research has focused on calcium metabolism, bone health, and the role of diet and the gut microbiome in mineral utilization. Among her most notable studies is a series of investigations into soluble corn fiber as a dietary prebiotic that enhances calcium absorption and retention at critical stages in women’s lives adolescence and post-menopause. Weaver and her colleagues at Purdue University demonstrated that supplementing with soluble corn fiber improved calcium utilization in both adolescent girls and postmenopausal women. The studies, published in the Journal of Nutrition and the American Journal of Clinical Nutrition, showed that daily consumption of 10 to 20 grams of soluble corn fiber enhanced calcium absorption by up to 12 percent in adolescents and improved bone calcium retention by up to 7 percent in postmenopausal women. According to Weaver, these findings suggest that soluble corn fiber may counteract the average rate of bone loss typically observed in postmenopausal women.

The studies employed isotope-based methods using calcium tracers (^41Ca, ^43Ca, and ^44Ca) analyzed through accelerator mass spectrometry at Purdue’s Rare Isotope Measurement Laboratory (PRIME Lab). This advanced approach allowed precise measurement of calcium absorption and bone turnover. Weaver’s team found that the prebiotic fiber, when metabolized by gut microbes into short-chain fatty acids, facilitated greater calcium bioavailability and bone formation.

Weaver emphasized that while calcium intake remains critical for bone health, prebiotic fibers such as soluble corn fiber can further enhance calcium absorption and skeletal development, particularly among individuals not meeting recommended dairy or calcium intake levels. She noted that calcium alone suppresses bone loss, whereas prebiotic fibers appear to stimulate bone formation. This work led to the FDA approval to list soluble corn fiber as a dietary fiber on nutrition packaging labels.

=== Camp DASH study ===
Weaver was the principal investigator of Camp DASH (Dietary Approaches to Stop Hypertension), a federally funded research by the National Institutes of Health (NIH) to study the effects of diet and sodium reduction on blood pressure in adolescents. The camp involved 40 boys and girls aged 11–15 years old from Midwest staying at Tarkington Residence Hall.

The study ended disastrously in 2017 after allegations of sexual abuses, aggravated assault, intimidation, fondling, sexual battery, child pornography, and voyeurism. During the research sessions, local police responded to calls about fighting, threats involving a firearm, and other behavior. According to the internal university report and the police reports, Weaver was notified that a camper has touched another camper inappropriately. The police report indicated that the offending camper had been removed from the program, but it remained unclear whether the camp staff reported the incident to the Department of Child Services as mandated by the laws in the state of Indiana. The university reports also alleged that Weaver was aware of violence between participants of the camp but didn't report the incident until later. Purdue University said that they found several instances of non-compliance on the part of Weaver as the study's principal investigator.

In September 2019 Weaver sued Purdue University to stop them destroying her research at Camp DASH.
