= Critical Reviews in Food Science and Nutrition =

- Discipline: Nutrition science
- Language: English
- Edited by: Fergus M. Clydesdale

Publication details
- Former name: Critical Reviews in Food Technology
- History: 1970–present
- Publisher: Taylor & Francis
- Frequency: Monthly
- Impact factor: 11.176 (2020)

Standard abbreviations
- ISO 4: Crit. Rev. Food Sci. Nutr.

Indexing
- ISSN: 1040-8398 (print); 1549-7852 (web)

Links
- Journal homepage

Critical Reviews in Food Science and Nutrition is a food science journal published monthly by the British firm Taylor & Francis that is a division of Informa. The academic journal was originally established in 1970 as Critical Reviews in Food Technology, but changed to its current name in 1975. The editor-in-chief is Fergus M. Clydesdale (University of Massachusetts Amherst).

According to the Journal Citation Reports, the journal has a 2019 impact factor of 7.860, ranking it third out of 89 journals in the category "Nutrition and Dietetics" and fourth out of 139 journals in the category "Food Science and Technology". As of 2024, the impact factor is 7.3.
