= International Association for Engineering and Food =

Global body representing professional engineering societies

The International Association for Engineering and Food (IAEF) is a global body of around 25 delegates representing professional engineering societies including food engineering activities. This organization identifies the sites for ICEF events. ICEF, International Congress on Engineering and Food, is a congress in the field of food engineering. It is usually held in a four year cycle at different locations.

== ICEF Events ==
- ICEF 14: Nantes (France), 2023
- ICEF 13: Melbourne (Australia), 2019
- ICEF 12: Québec City (Canada), 2015
- ICEF 11: Athens (Greece), 2011
- ICEF 10: Viña del Mar (Chile), 2008
- ICEF 9: Montpellier (France), 2004
- ICEF 8: Puebla (Mexico), 2000
- ICEF 7: Brighton (England), 1997
- ICEF 6: Chiba (Japan), 1993
- ICEF 5: Cologne (Germany), 1989
- ICEF 4: Edmonton (Canada), 1985
- ICEF 3: Dublin (Ireland), 1983
- ICEF 2: Helsinki (Finland), 1979
- ICEF 1: Boston (United States), 1976

== See also ==
- Food Engineering
- Food Science
- Food Technology
