= George F. Stewart =

American food scientist (1908–1982)

George F. Stewart (February 22, 1908 – March 18, 1982) was an American food scientist who was involved in processing, preservation, chemistry, and microbiology of poultry and egg-based food products. He also became the first president of the International Union of Food Science and Technology (IUFoST) after it was formed at the 1970 conference in Washington, D.C., from the International Congress of Food Science and Technology.

== Early life and college ==
Born in Mesa, Arizona, Stewart developed an interest in the southwestern U.S. and the environment that never left him. He would earn a B.S. in Chemistry from the University of Chicago in 1930 and a Ph.D. in Dairy chemistry from Cornell University in 1933.

== Industrial career ==
Stewart worked as a chemist for Ocoma Foods in Omaha, Nebraska, for five years. This gave him early experience in the dynamics of the food industry. The experience Stewart gained in the food industry would prove valuable when he returned to academia.

== University of California involvement ==
In 1951, Stewart joined the University of California, Davis faculty as chair of the Department of Avian Sciences (then known as Poultry Husbandry). He would lead the transition of the department between the University of California, Berkeley and Davis between 1951 and 1958 and expand the department in faculty and building size. Taking a sabbatical year in Australia as a Fulbright scholar in 1958, Stewart played a key role in modernizing Australia's poultry industry.

In 1959, Stewart returned to UC-Davis as chair of the Department of Food Science and Technology (FST) where he would serve until 1964. At the university's request in 1964, Stewart was named director of the food protection and toxicology center and became chair of the newly formed Department of Environmental Toxicology, a position he would hold until 1970.

Stewart returned to the FST department in 1970 as a teacher and researcher, including serving as coordinator of the Food packaging program from 1969 to 1974. He retired from UC Davis in 1975.

== Research focus ==
Stewart's research was on the processing and preservation of poultry meat and eggs. This included being the first person to demonstrate the browning reaction in dried eggs with a reaction between glucose and protein, the first to deal with time-temperature studies in egg pasteurization and poultry freezing, the first to determine antibiotic resistance in pathogenic bacteria in refrigerated poultry, and the first to determine the time between egg laying and eggshell composition to maintain internal product quality. His research led to over seventy-five published papers, the co-founding of Advances in Food Research in 1958, and the co-founding of the Journal of Food Nutrition Education and Monographs in Food Science and Technology.

== Professional involvement ==
Stewart was involved in many organizations, including IUFoST and the Institute of Food Technologists (IFT), serving as a charter member in 1939 and as IFT President in 1967-68. Among his service at IFT was being editor-in-chief of Food Technology and the Journal of Food Science (JFS) from January 1961 to July 1966. During his role as editor, Stewart would transfer much of the basic research from Food Technology to the Journal of Food Science, paving the way for JFS to be an entirely research scientific journal by 1971. He was also involved in the Poultry Science Association on its board of directors and was also named a fellow. Stewart was involved in other professional organizations, including the American Chemical Society, the American Dairy Science Association, the American Institute of Nutrition, the American Association for the Advancement of Science, Society for Nutrition Education and Behavior and the International Union of Nutritional Sciences.

== Awards and honors ==
Nicholas Appert Award (1974)

== Selected work ==
- Vaughn, R.H.; Ng, H.; Stewart, G.F.; Nagel, C.W.; Simpson, K.L. (1960). "Antibiotics in Poultry Meat Preservation: Development in Vitro of Bacterial Resistance to Chlortetracycline". Applied and Environmental Microbiology. 8 (1): 27–30. doi:10.1128/am.8.1.27-30.1960. PMC 1057545. PMID 13841490.
