= Alton E. Bailey =

American chemist (1907–1952)

- Born: 1907; Midland, Texas, United States
- Died: May 1952 (aged 44–45)
- Education: University of New Mexico
- Known for: publishing Bailey's Industrial Oils and Fat Products

Alton E. Bailey (1907-1952) was an American chemist. He is best known for being publisher of the book Industrial Oils and Fat Products, which was renamed after his death to Bailey's Industrial Oils and Fat Products.

== Life ==
Bailey was born in Midland, Texas in 1907. He studied at the University of New Mexico and received his bachelor's degree in 1927. He started working for the Santa Fe Railroad and in 1929 he changed to the Cudahy Packing Company where he did research mostly on fat and oil chemistry.

Between 1945 and 1950 he worked for the Girdler Corporation. Bailey died May 1953.

== Alton E. Bailey Award ==
Each year, the Alton E. Bailey award is presented by the American Oil Chemists' Society to a deserving fats and oil chemist. The 2017 Award Recipient was Dr. Dharma Kodali, a professor at the University of Minnesota.
