= Michael P. Doyle (microbiologist) =

American microbiologist and academic

- Born: 3 October 1949 (age 77)
- Known for: food safety interventions Annual Review of Food Science and Technology
- Awards: Food Safety Award of the International Association for Food Protection (1999)

Academic work
- Discipline: microbiology
- Sub-discipline: food microbiology
- Institutions: University of Georgia
- Main interests: E. coli

External videos
- “Innovative Chemical Treatments to Kill Foodborne Pathogens - Michael Doyle, PhD”, January 16, 2017.

Michael Patrick Doyle is a microbiologist. He is an emeritus Regents Professor of Food Microbiology at the University of Georgia's College of Agricultural and Environmental Sciences and the former director of the college's Center for Food Safety, where he researched foodborne bacterial pathogens. Doyle was the first food microbiologist to study E. coli. He developed patents for several food safety interventions, including one used as a meat wash.

Doyle was a founding editor of the Annual Review of Food Science and Technology in 2010 continuing through 2021. Doyle won the Food Safety Award of the International Association for Food Protection (IAFP) in 1999 and was named a life member of the IAFP in 2018.

== Education ==
Doyle graduated from the University of Wisconsin-Madison with a B.S. degree in Bacteriology (1973), followed by an M.S. (1975) and Ph.D. (1977) in food microbiology under the direction of UW professor and adviser Dr. Elmer Marth.

In 1980, Doyle joined the University of Wisconsin-Madison as a faculty member of the Food Research Institute at UWM. In 1991 Doyle joined the University of Georgia's College of Agricultural and Environmental Sciences, where he established the UGA Center for Food Safety.

Doyle is a member of the American Academy of Microbiology; the American Association for the Advancement of Science; the American Society for Microbiology; the International Association for Food Protection (IAFP); the Institute of Medicine of the National Academies; the National Academy of Inventors;Phi Kappa Phi; Sigma Xi; and Gamma Sigma Delta. In 1999, Doyle was awarded the Food Safety Award of the International Association for Food Protection (IAFP) and became a Fellow of the IAFP. In 2018 he was named an Honorary Life Member of the IAFP.
