= Faculty of Food Technology, Latvia University of Life Sciences and Technologies =

- Latvijas Lauksaimniecības universitātes Pārtikas tehnoloģijas fakultāte
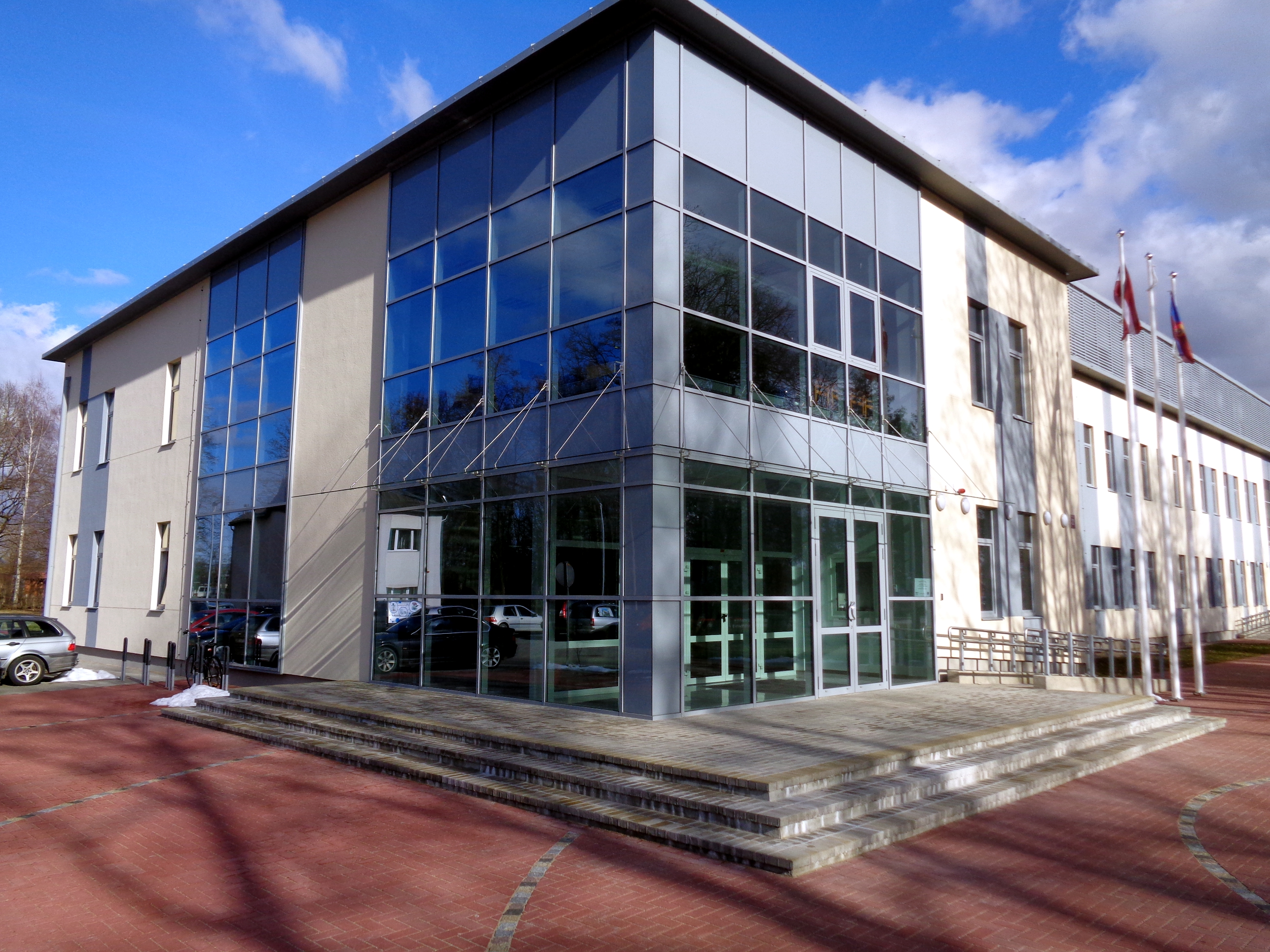
- Former names: Faculty of Food Industry Technology
- Type: Faculty
- Established: 1948
- Affiliations: Latvia University of Life Sciences and Technologies
- Dean: Mārtiņš Šabovics
- Academic staff: 46
- Location: Jelgava, Latvia; 56°39′42″N 23°45′09″E
- Campus: Jelgava, Rīgas iela 22A, LV-3004
- Website: ptf.llu.lv

Faculty of Food Technology (Latvian: Pārtikas tehnoloģijas fakultāte) is a faculty of Latvia University of Life Sciences and Technologies founded in 1948. It offers second-level professional higher education studies in food technology (Pārtikas tehnoloģija), academic baccalaureate studies in food quality and innovations (Pārtikas kvalitāte un inovācijas) and professional baccalaureate studies in catering and hotel management (Ēdināšanas un viesnīcu uzņēmējdarbība), as well as academic master's degree studies in food science (Pārtikas zinātne) and nutrition science (Uzturzinātne; in cooperation with Latvian University and Riga Stradiņš University) and doctoral studies in food science (Pārtikas zinātne).

== History ==
On 22 October 2014 Latvia University of Life Sciences and Technologies signed a 2.34 million euro contract with a building company "RCBS" for the construction of a new Faculty of Food Technology two-storey building and its surrounding territory behind the Valdeka castle in 22 Riga Street, Jelgava for the total area of 1513.2 m^{2}. The construction took place from autumn of 2014 till the summer of 2015. The official opening ceremony was held on May 11, 2016, but the building was open for lectures and laboratory work already since February 1, 2016.

On the first floor scientific laboratories and pilot plants for fruit and vegetable processing, beer manufacturing, grain processing and bread production, milk, meat and fish processing are located, as well as a packaging plant, but the second floor contains auditoriums, instructional laboratories and the dean's office.

== Divisions ==
The Faculty is divided into three departments:

- Department of Chemistry;
- Department of Food Technology;
- Department of Nutrition.

== Deans ==
- Pāvils Zariņš (1948–1961);
- Fricis Angers (1961–1964);
- Ernests Jurevics (1964–1974);
- Ināra Melngalve (1974–1993);
- Daina Kārkliņa (1993–2006);
- Inga Ciproviča (2006–2017);
- Mārtiņš Šabovics (2017–present).

== Gallery ==
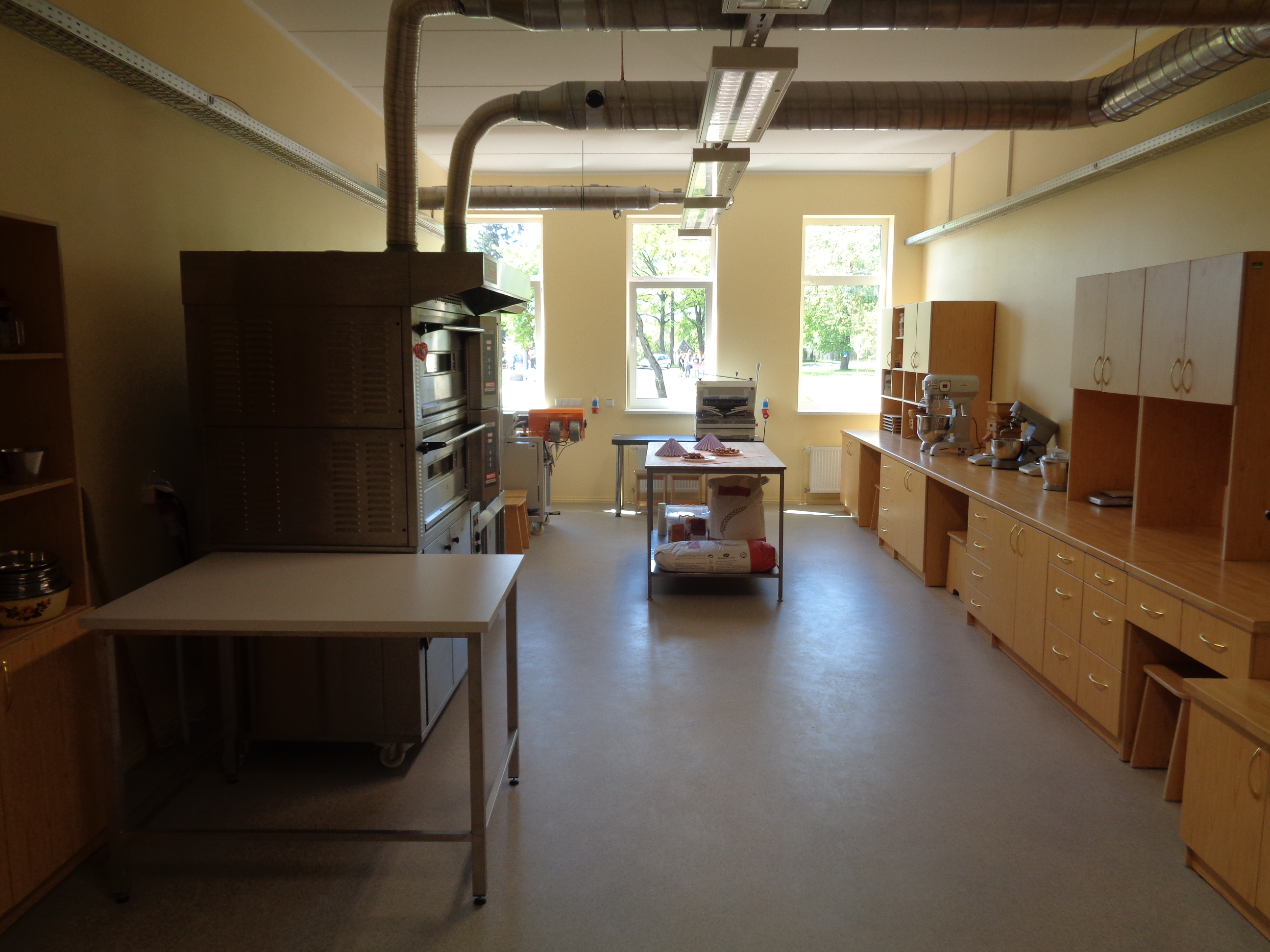
Bakery

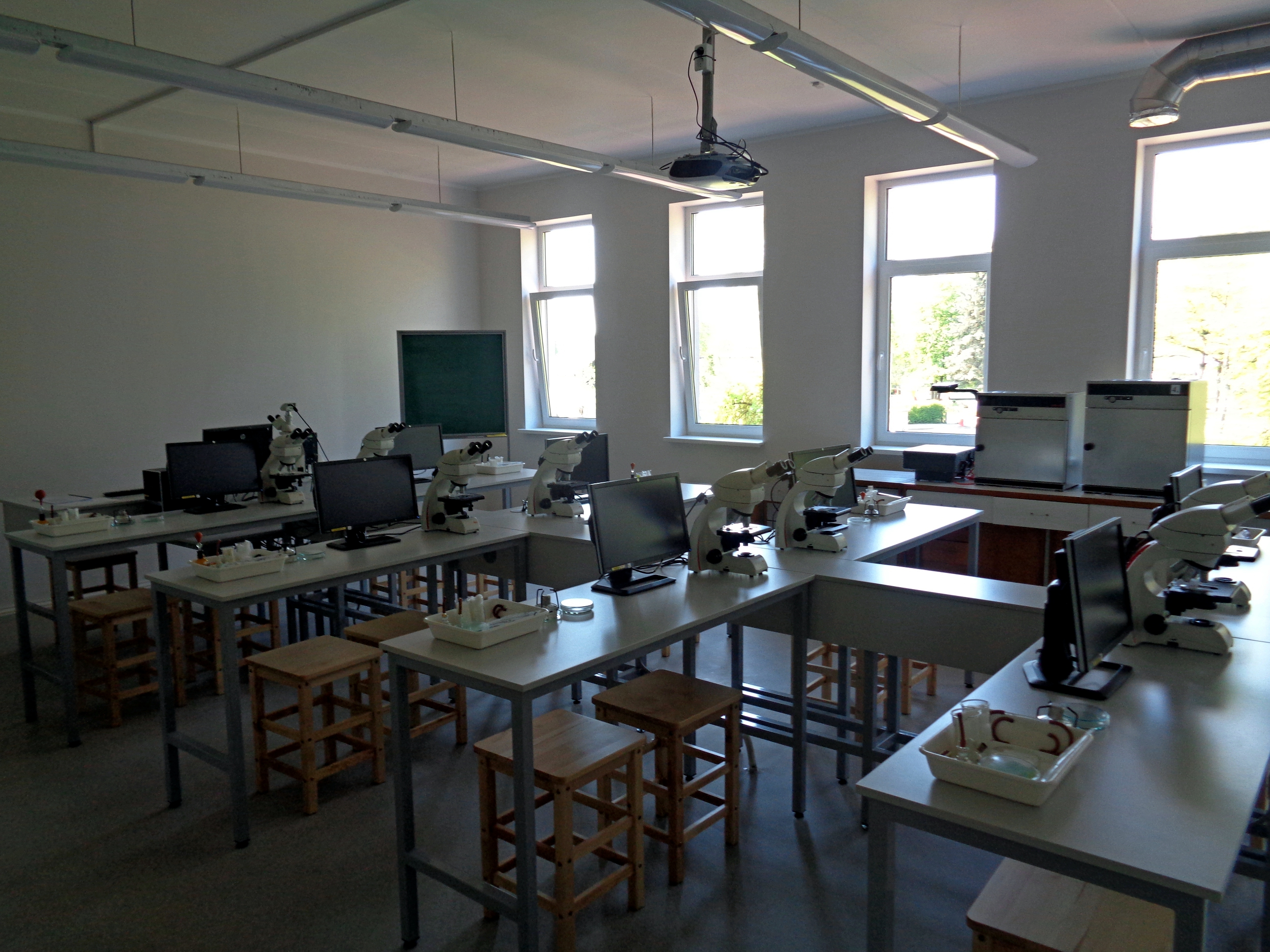
Food microbiology laboratory
