= Journal of Functional Foods =

Peer-reviewed scientific journal

- Discipline: Food science
- Language: English
- Edited by: Vincenzo Fogliano, Mingfu Wang

Publication details
- History: 2004-present
- Publisher: Elsevier
- Frequency: Monthly
- Open access: Hybrid
- Impact factor: 5.6 (2022)

Standard abbreviations
- ISO 4: J. Funct. Foods

Indexing
- ISSN: 1756-4646 (print); 2214-9414 (web)
- LCCN: 2009208857
- OCLC no.: 297176959

Links
- Journal homepage

Journal of Functional Foods is a monthly peer-reviewed scientific journal covering various aspects of food research. It is published by Elsevier and was established in 2009. The editor-in-chief is Vincenzo Fogliano (Wageningen University) and Mingfu Wang (Shenzhen University).

The journal publishes research articles, reviews, and commentaries related to functional foods, including the role of food ingredients, food digestion, safety, and processing.

== Abstracting and indexing ==
The journal is abstracted and indexed, for example, in:

- CAB Abstracts
- Science Citation Index Expanded
- Scopus

According to the Journal Citation Reports, the journal has a 2022 impact factor of 5.6.
