= Stanley B. Freeborn =

Stanley Barron Freeborn
- Born: December 11, 1891
- Died: July 17, 1960
- Occupation: Chancellor of University of California, Davis

Stanley Barron Freeborn (December 11, 1891 – July 17, 1960) served as the first chancellor of University of California, Davis between 1958 and June 1959. Prior to being the first chancellor of UC Davis, Freeborn was the dean of the College of Agriculture at UC Berkeley. Following his death in 1960, UC Davis renamed its assembly hall to Freeborn Hall in his honor.
