= Chinese American Food Society =

US-based organization

The Chinese American Food Society (CAFS) is an American-based organization founded in 1974 to develop relationships among Chinese-born food scientists in academia, government, and industry. Its current president is Yao Olive Li, a professor at California State Polytechnic University, Pomona.

Founded at the 1974 Institute of Food Technologists (IFT) annual meeting in New Orleans, Louisiana, the organization was first called the "IFT-Chinese Association," then changed to "The Association of Chinese Food Scientists in America" before changing to its current name in 1983. The first award was issued in 1983 and it was awarded to Stephen S. Chang who received the Professional Achievement Award. A Distinguished Service Award was established in 1987, and awards for graduate students and high school students were also created in 1983 and 2002, respectively.

The CAFS is partnered with the IFT and its International division, and also publishes an online/electronically issued newsletter two to four times a year.

In 2004, CAFS was a main supporter of the Food Summit in China event held jointly with the IFT and the Chinese Institute of Food Science and Technology (CIFST) that was held in Beijing on November 7–10 of that year.

At the 2007 IFT Annual Meeting in Chicago, Illinois, they hosted a symposium on Chinese health food involving food science and technology issues on July 27–28.

Over the past 45 years, CAFS has been established as a platform for Food Science and Technology professionals to exchange information, collaborate on various taskforce activities, and to promote knowledge advancement, technology innovation and transfer across several continents. Each year there are always one or more CAFS lifetime members who are recognized as IFT Fellows, Annual Achievement Awardees, and recipients of various award and recognition from a broad range of national and international organizations.
