= American Oil Chemists' Society =

International professional organization

The American Oil Chemists' Society
- Founded: 1909; 117 years ago
- Type: Professional Association
- Purpose: Chemistry
- Location: Urbana, Illinois
- Region served: Worldwide
- Members: c. 2,000
- Website: www.aocs.org

The American Oil Chemists' Society (AOCS) is an international professional organization based in Urbana, Illinois dedicated to providing the support network for those involved with the science and technology related to fats, oils, surfactants, and other related materials.

Founded in 1909, AOCS has approximately 2,000 members in 90 countries who are active in a total of ten divisions and six sections, of which only one of the sections is within the United States.

== History ==
The AOCS was started in May 1909 under the name Society of Cotton Products Analysts as a group that promoted recommended methods for chemical processes focused on the cottonseed industry. In 1920, the name was changed to American Oil Chemists' Society. In 1976, AOCS hosted the first World Conference on Oilseed and Vegetable Oils Processing Technologies in Amsterdam, presided over by the AOCS president Frank White.

According to the official AOCS site, "the mission of AOCS is to provide high standards of quality among those with a professional interest in the science and technology of fats, oils, surfactants, and related materials and is continually fulfilled by AOCS Technical Services. Its esteemed products and services help professionals maintain excellence in their industry".

== Technical (Laboratory) Services ==
AOCS Technical has been facilitating global trade and laboratory integrity through its fine products, programs, and services since 1909.

Official Methods and Recommended Practices of the AOCS,6th Edition AOCS methods are used in hundreds of laboratories on all six continents. The 6th Edition contains more than 400 fats, oils and lipid related methods critical for processing and trading.

Laboratory Proficiency Program (LPP) The AOCS LPP is a collaborative proficiency testing program for oil- and fat-related commodities, oilseeds, oilseed meals, and edible fats. Established in 1915, more than 500 chemists in over 40 countries participate, creating a who's who list of companies in the fats and oils world.

== Publications ==
AOCS has published over 100 books, three technical journals related to edible oil chemistry: Journal of the American Oil Chemists' Society (JAOCS), Lipids, Journal of Surfactants and Detergents, and the news magazine, International News on Fats, Oils, and Related Materials (INFORM).

In addition to its own distribution channels, AOCS has also partnered with online libraries like CRC/Taylor & Francis and Springer to make content available electronically.

== Meetings ==
AOCS holds the international Annual Meeting every year for both members and non-members. In 2009, the 100th annual meeting was held in Orlando, Florida, celebrating the centennial of the organization.

In addition to the annual meeting, there are several other smaller events held throughout the year. These meetings cover topics ranging from edible oil refining to lipid oxidation to biodiesel technologies.

== Committees ==
AOCS is made up of a collection of the following permanent committees, each representing part of what AOCS does:

- Nominating and Election Committee
- Leadership Canvassing Committee (LCC)
- Education and Meetings Steering Committee
- Program Committee
- Exhibits Committee
- Financial Steering Committee (FSC)
- Budget Committee
- Investment Committee
- Audit Committee
- Membership Steering Committee (MSC)
- Awards Administration Committee
- Membership Development Committee (MDC)
- Sections Committee
- Publications Steering Committee (PSC)
- Books and Special Publications Committee (BSPC)
- inform Committee
- JAOCS Committee
- JSD Committee
- Lipids Committee
- Technical Steering Committee (TSC)
- Examination Board
- Laboratory Proficiency Program Committee
- Uniform Methods Committee

== Awards ==
At its annual meetings, AOCS hands out a total of 34 awards, broken down into five service (including fellow), three scientific, twelve sectional/ divisional and fourteen student (excluding one that has been discontinued as of 2006). These include:

- The Alton E. Bailey Award
