= American Society for Enology and Viticulture =

The American Society for Enology and Viticulture, founded in 1950, is a non-profit, scientific wine production industry organization headquartered in Davis, California.

Its membership of 2,400 includes professionals from wineries, vineyards, academic institutions and organizations. In addition, it has 120 Industrial Affiliates (companies).

== Purpose ==
It is dedicated to promoting the interests of enologists, viticulturists, and others in the fields of wine and grape research and production throughout the world.

The society publishes the American Journal of Enology and Viticulture.

== See also ==
- California wine
- California wine organizations
- United States wine
