= Food microbiology =

Study of the microorganisms that inhabit, create, or contaminate food

Food microbiology is the study of the microorganisms that inhabit, create, or contaminate food. This includes the study of microorganisms causing food spoilage; pathogens that may cause disease (especially if food is improperly cooked or stored); microbes used to produce fermented foods such as cheese, yogurt, bread, beer, and wine; and microbes with other useful roles, such as producing probiotics.

== Subgroups of bacteria that affect food ==
In the study of bacteria in food, important groups have been subdivided based on certain characteristics. These groupings are not of taxonomic significance:

- Lactic acid bacteria are bacteria that use carbohydrates to produce lactic acid. The main genera are Lactococcus, Leuconostoc, Pediococcus, Lactobacillus and Streptococcus thermophilus.
- Acetic acid bacteria like Acetobacter aceti produce acetic acid.
- Bacteria such as Propionibacterium freudenreichii that produce propionic acid are used to ferment dairy products.
- Some Clostridium spp. Clostridium butyricum produce butyric acid.
- Proteolytic bacteria hydrolyze proteins by producing extracellular proteinases. This group includes bacteria species from the Micrococcus, Staphylococcus, Bacillus, Clostridium, Pseudomonas, Alteromonas, Flavobacterium and Alcaligenes genera, and more limited from Enterobacteriaceae and Brevibacterium.
- Lipolytic bacteria hydrolyze triglycerides by production of extracellular lipases. This group includes bacteria species from the Micrococcus, Staphylococcus, Pseudomonas, Alteromonas and Flavobacterium genera.
- Saccharolytic bacteria hydrolyze complex carbohydrates. This group includes bacteria species from the Bacillus, Clostridium, Aeromonas, Pseudomonas and Enterobacter genera.
- Thermophilic bacteria are able to thrive in high temperatures above 50 Celsius, including genera Bacillus, Clostridium, Pediococcus, Streptococcus, and Lactobacillus. Thermoduric bacteria, including spores, can survive pasteurization. Bacteria that grow in cold temperatures below 5 Celsius are called psychotropic and include bacteria species from many genera including Alcaligenes, Serratia, Leuconostoc, Carnobacterium, Brochothrix, Listeria and Yersinia.
- Halotolerant bacteria can survive high salt concentrations greater than 10%. This includes some species from Vibrio and Corynebacterium. Aciduric bacteria survive at low pH.
- Osmophilic bacteria, while less osmophilic than yeasts and molds, can tolerate a relatively higher osmotic environment. Aerobes require oxygen, while anaerobes are inhibited by it. Facultative anaerobes can grow with and without oxygen.
- Some bacteria can produce gases during metabolism of nutrients, others produce slime by synthesizing polysaccharides.
- Spore producing bacteria are further divided into subgroups of aerobic, anaerobic, flat sour, thermophilic and sulfide-producing.
- Coliforms, including fecal coliforms (such as e.coli) are used as a measure of sanitation. Enteric pathogens can cause gastrointestinal infection and may be included in this group.

== Food safety ==
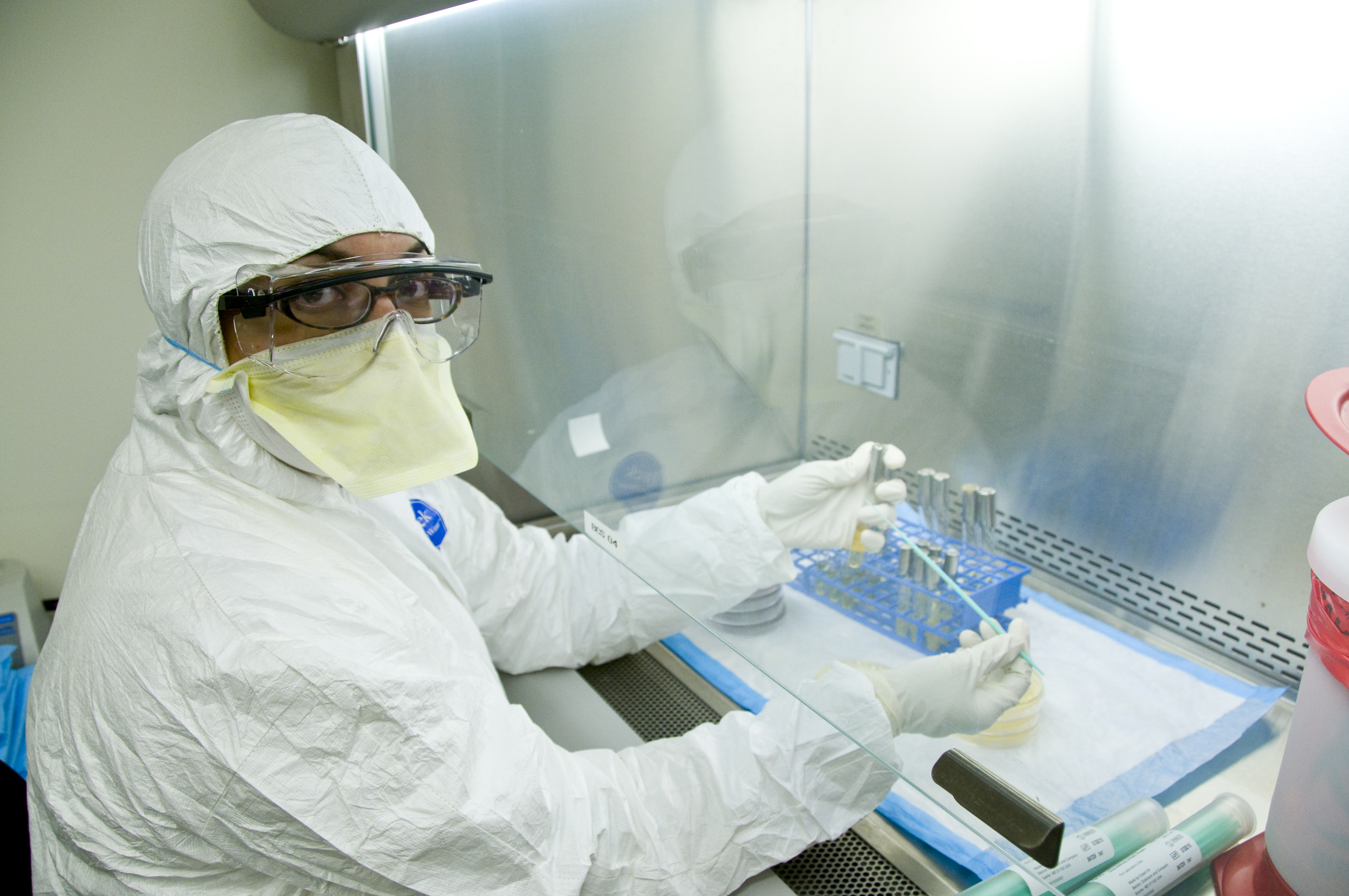
A microbiologist working in a biosafety laboratory tests for high risk pathogens in food

Food safety is a major focus of food microbiology. Numerous agents of disease and pathogens are readily transmitted via food which includes bacteria and viruses. Microbial toxins are also possible contaminants of food; However, microorganisms and their products can also be used to combat these pathogenic microbes. Probiotic bacteria, including those that produce bacteriocins can kill and inhibit pathogens. Alternatively, purified bacteriocins such as nisin can be added directly to food products. Finally, bacteriophages, viruses that only infect bacteria can be used to kill bacterial pathogens. Thorough preparation of food, including proper cooking, eliminates most bacteria and viruses. However, toxins produced by contaminants may not be liable to change to non-toxic forms by heating or cooking the contaminated food due to other safety conditions.

== Fermentation ==
Fermentation is one of the methods to preserve food and alter its quality. Yeast, especially Saccharomyces cerevisiae, is used to leaven bread, brew beer and make wine. Certain bacteria, including lactic acid bacteria, are used to make yogurt, cheese, hot sauce, pickles, fermented sausages and dishes such as kimchi. A common effect of these fermentations is that the food product is less hospitable to other microorganisms, including pathogens and spoilage-causing microorganisms, thus extending the food's shelf-life. Some cheese varieties also require molds to ripen and develop their characteristic flavors.

== Microbial biopolymers ==
Several microbially produced biopolymers are used in the food industry.

=== Alginate ===
Alginates can be used as thickening agents. Although listed here under the category 'Microbial polysaccharides', commercial alginates are currently only produced by extraction from brown seaweeds such as Laminaria hyperborea or L. japonica.

=== Poly-γ-glutamic acid ===
Poly-γ-glutamic acid (γ-PGA) produced by various strains of Bacillus has potential applications as a thickener in the food industry.

== Food testing ==
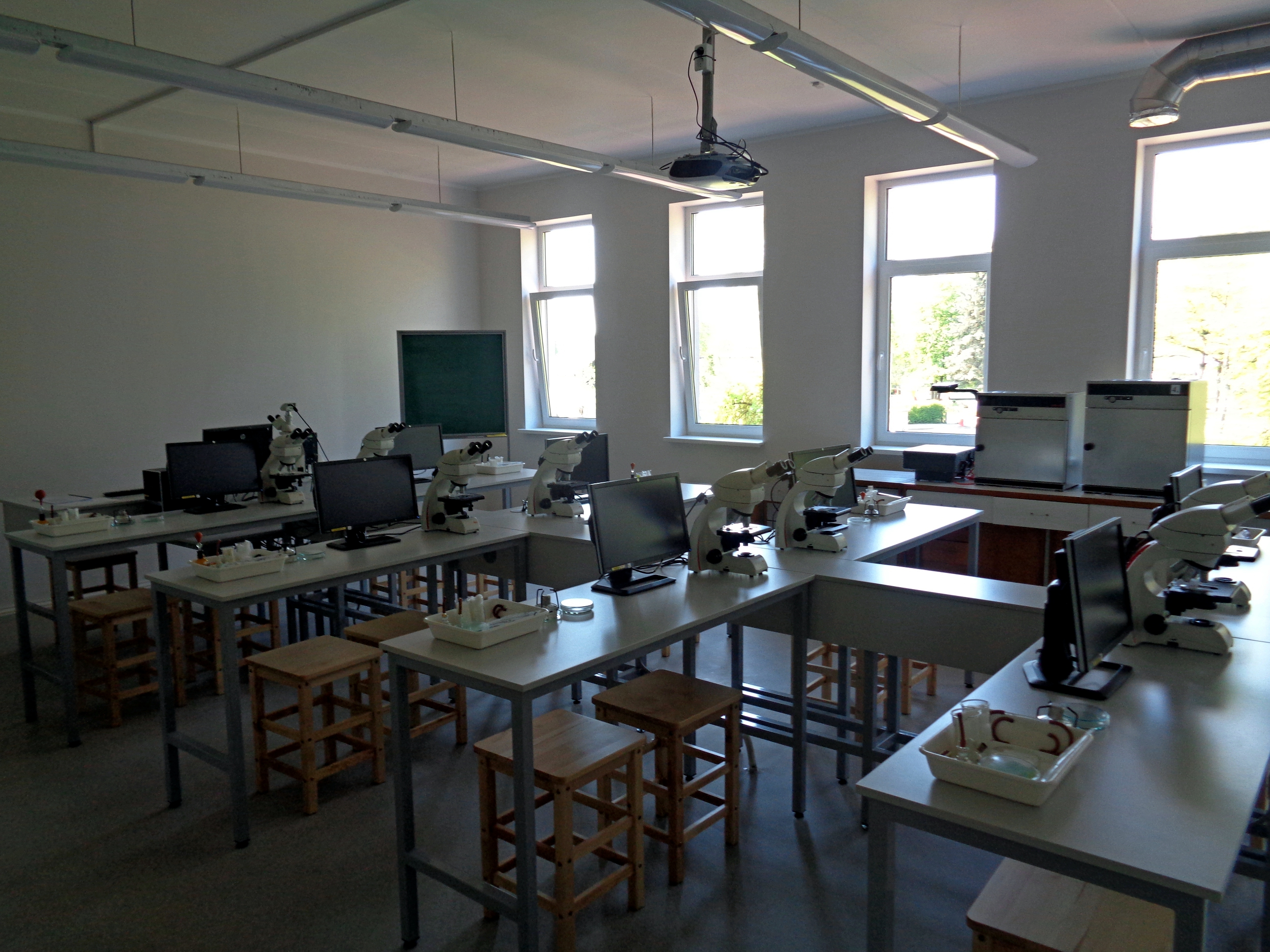
Food microbiology laboratory at the Faculty of Food Technology, Latvia University of Life Sciences and Technologies

To ensure safety of food products, microbiological tests such as testing for pathogens and spoilage organisms are required. This way the risk of contamination under normal use conditions can be examined and food poisoning outbreaks can be prevented. Testing of food products and ingredients is important along the whole supply chain as possible flaws of products can occur at every stage of production. Apart from detecting spoilage, microbiological tests can also determine germ content, identify yeasts and molds, and Salmonella. For Salmonella, scientists are also developing rapid and portable technologies capable of identifying unique variants of Salmonella.

Polymerase chain reaction (PCR) is a quick and inexpensive method to generate numbers of copies of a DNA fragment at a specific band ("PCR (Polymerase Chain Reaction)," 2008). For that reason, scientists are using PCR to detect different kinds of viruses or bacteria, such as HIV and anthrax based on their unique DNA patterns. Various kits are commercially available to help in food pathogen nucleic acids extraction, PCR detection, and differentiation. The detection of bacterial strands in food products is very important to everyone in the world, for it helps prevent the occurrence of food borne illness. Therefore, PCR is recognized as a DNA detector in order to amplify and trace the presence of pathogenic strands in different processed food.

== See also ==
- Anisakis
- Baker's yeast
- Campylobacter
- Cysticercosis
- Environmental microbiology
- Escherichia coli
- Food safety
- Foodborne illness
- Fungal infection
- List of microorganisms used in food and beverage preparation
- Microbiology
- One Health
- Shigella
- Trichinosis
- Toxoplasmosis
- Yeast infection
- Zoonosis
