= List of food and drink magazines =

This is a list of food and drink magazines. This list also includes food studies journals.

== Food and drink magazines ==
- The Arbuturian
- L'Art culinaire
- Australian Dairy Foods
- Bon Appétit
- Buffé
- Cherry Bombe
- Cocina
- Cooking Light
- Cook's Illustrated
- La Cucina Italiana
- Cuisine
- La Cuisinière Cordon Bleu
- Dark Rye
- Everyday Food
- FDA Consumer
- Feel Good Food
- Fine Cooking
- Food & Wine
- Food Network Magazine
- Foodies
- Goodtoknow Recipes
- Gourmet Traveller
- Imbibe
- INOUT
- Lucky Peach
- Meatpaper
- Olive
- Le Pot au Feu
- Relish
- Restaurant
- Restaurant Insider
- Saveur
- Spirit Journal
- Sunset
- Tandoori Magazine
- Taste of Home
- Vegetarian Times
- VegNews
- Woman's Day
- Zester Daily

=== Beer and pub magazines ===
- All About Beer
- Draft Magazine
- Morning Advertiser
- The Publican

=== Food studies journals ===
- African Journal of Food, Agriculture, Nutrition and Development
- The American Journal of Clinical Nutrition
- Appetite
- Comprehensive Reviews in Food Science and Food Safety
- Food and Bioprocess Technology
- Food & History
- Food Quality and Preference
- Food Science and Technology International
- Food Structure
- Food Technology (magazine)
- Gastronomica: The Journal of Food and Culture
- Innovative Food Science and Emerging Technologies
- International Journal of Food Sciences and Nutrition
- Journal of Food Biochemistry
- Journal of Food Process Engineering
- Journal of Food Processing and Preservation
- Journal of Food Quality
- Journal of Food Safety
- Journal of Food Science
- The Journal of Food Science Education
- Journal of Sensory Studies
- Journal of Texture Studies
- Lebensmittel-Wissenschaft & Technologie
- Petits Propos Culinaires
- Trends in Food Science and Technology

=== Food and drink trade industry publications ===
- Beverage Digest
- Beverage Industry Magazine
- Beverage Innovation
- BevNet Magazine
- Beverage World
- The Drinks Business
- The Filling Business
- Food Chain Magazine
- Foodservice Magazine
- National Restaurant News
- The Plant Base
- QSR Magazine
- Refreshment Magazine
- Restaurant Business
- The Spirits Business

=== Wine magazines ===
- American Winery Guide
- Australian and New Zealand Wine Industry Journal
- Canadian Wine Annual
- Cocina
- Decanter
- Food & Wine
- Gambero Rosso
- Harpers Magazine (trade publication)
- Quarterly Review of Wines
- La Revue du vin de France
- Sommelier India
- Sommelier Journal
- Spirit Journal
- The Wine Advocate
- Wine & Spirit
- Wine & Spirits
- Wine Enthusiast
- Wine Spectator
- Wines & Vines
- The World of Fine Wine

== See also ==
- List of films about food and drink
- List of magazines
- List of websites about food and drink
