= Cuisine bourgeoise =

Style of French cooking

In French gastronomy, cuisine bourgeoise is the home cooking of middle class (bourgeoisie) families as distinguished from elaborate restaurant cooking, haute cuisine, and from the cooking of the regions, the peasantry, and the urban poor.

The cuisine bourgeoise has been documented since the 17th century: Nicolas de Bonnefons, Le Jardinier françois (1651) and Les delices de la campagne (1684); François Menon, Cuisinière bourgeoise (1746); and Louis Eustache Audot, Cuisinière de la campagne et de la ville (1818). Starting in the 19th century, a series of cookbooks go beyond simply listing recipes to teaching technique: Jule Gouffé, Livre de cuisine (1867); Félix Urbain Dubois, École des cuisinières (1887).

In the late 19th century, cooking schools such as Le Cordon Bleu and magazines such as La Cuisinière Cordon Bleu and Le Pot-au-feu, emerged in Paris to teach cooking technique to bourgeois women. Pellaprat's La Cuisine de tous les jours (1914) and Le Livre de cuisine de Madame Saint-Ange (1927) come from those cooking schools.
