= In and out =

In and Out, In & Out, or In 'n Out may refer to:

== Music ==
=== Albums ===
- In 'n Out, a 1964 album by Joe Henderson
- In and Out (album), a 2009 album by James Blood Ulmer

=== Songs ===
- "In and Out" (Willie Hutch song), 1982
- "In & Out" (Marcus Canty song), 2012
- "In and Out", a song by Beth Ditto from Fake Sugar
- "In and Out", a song by Keith Sweat from Rebirth
- "In and Out", a song by Moev from Head Down
- "In and Out", a song by Psapp from What Makes Us Glow
- "In and Out", a song by Scarface from The Last of a Dying Breed
- "In and Out", a song by Screaming Jets from World Gone Crazy
- "In and Out", a song by Speedway from Save Yourself
- "In and Out", a song by Wes Montgomery from Movin' Wes
- "In and Out", a 2002 song by 3rd Edge
- "In 'n' Out", a song by Van Halen from For Unlawful Carnal Knowledge
- "In & Out", a 2000 song by Crispy

== Film ==
- In & Out (festival), gay and lesbian film festival in Nice, France
- In and Out (1914 film), a short film
- In and Out (1989 film), an animated short film by Alison Snowden and David Fine
- In & Out (film), a 1997 comedy film starring Kevin Kline

== Other uses ==
- Naval and Military Club in London, nicknamed "The In & Out"
- In-N-Out Burger, an American fast-food restaurant chain
- In and Out scandal, a 2006 Canadian political scandal

== See also ==
- In Out, a British food and drink magazine
- The In Out, an indie rock band from Boston, MA
