= Fricandeau =

Traditional French meat dish

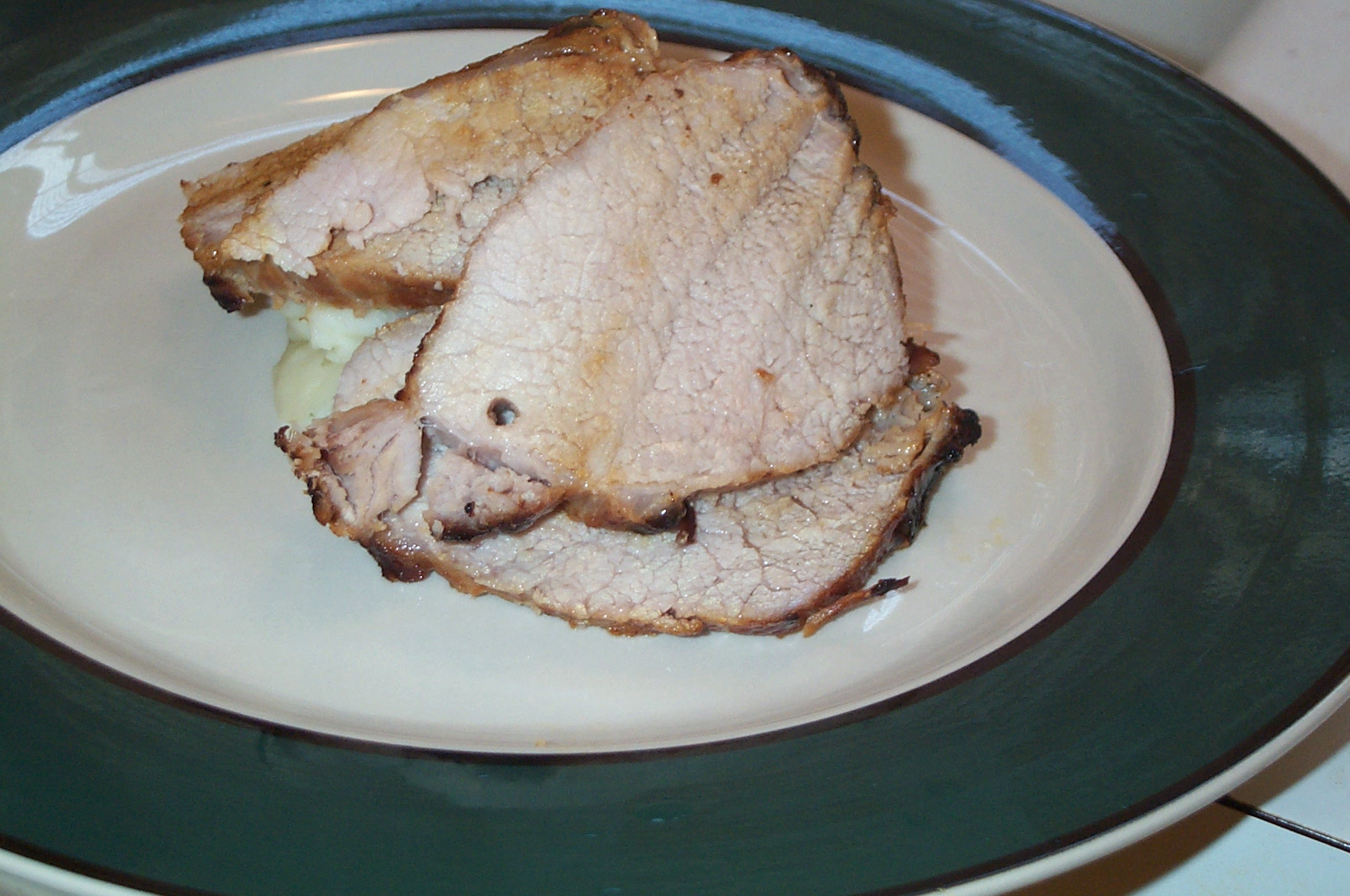
A slice of fricandeau

The fricandeau (plural, fricandeaux) is a traditional French dish, dating back to the sixteenth century. Slices of veal are studded with bacon and slowly braised. Each slice is served whole, and the result is intended to be so tender than it can be cut with a spoon. In the past other meats have been used, but veal is now usual.

== History and etymology ==
The Dictionnaire de l'Académie Française dates the term fricandeau back to the sixteenth century, and says that it derives from fricasser, to make a fricassee. Earlier editions mention beef or rabbit as possible meats, but the current edition mentions only veal. Alexandre Dumas makes reference to fricandeau in his Grand Dictionnaire de cuisine (1873), presenting "Old-fashioned fricandeau – an old recipe that is better than the current way of doing things". Both Dickens and Thackeray were familiar with the dish, as were Abraham Lincoln and Benjamin Disraeli. The dish was taken up in Austria, the Netherlands, Poland, and Switzerland, Eliza Acton gave a recipe for it in her Modern Cookery for Private Families (1845).

The first recorded mention of the word in English was in 1706, and it was still well enough known in Britain for H. W. Fowler to have an entry for it in his Modern English Usage (1926), although it was dropped when Sir Ernest Gowers revised the book in 1965. Auguste Escoffier gave a recipe for fricandeau in his Le Guide culinaire (1903) and Madame Saint-Ange (1927) published a considerably fuller one.

== Contents ==
Fricandeaux are slices of veal taken from the noix de veau – broadly the same as the silverside in English butchery or the bottom round in American – cut in the direction of the grain of the meat. Their thickness, according to Escoffier, must not exceed 4 centimetres (1.5 inches). The surface of the meat is beaten to break up the fibres and a larding needle is then used to stud the veal with fatty bacon lardons. The meat is lightly sealed – not browned – in a frying pan with butter. It is then gently braised on the hob in white wine or veal stock or both, together with onions and carrots. When the liquids have reduced to a syrupy consistency the cooking continues in the oven.

The dish was traditionally so tender that it was cut with a spoon rather than a knife. It was at one time usually accompanied by sorrel (oseille), but according to Madame Saint-Ange the herb was believed to cause gout. In her 1927 book she wrote that le fricandeau à l'oseille was:

a memory, for people who are now elderly, of a very distant time when it had not yet occurred to proscribe sorrel from the diet of the gouty, that is to say, of the gourmets – where the white-capped cooks – who could not read brought to the execution of a family dish the time and care that made it excellent.

Dumas took the view that most cooks used too much stock, so that the meat lacked flavour. The gourmet and food writer Curnonsky recommended using cognac instead of white wine.

== Variants ==
Although it has the same name, the fricandeau of the Auvergne is quite different from the customary fricandeau, being a sort of pork pâté. The name has also been used for dishes of sturgeon and sweetbreads.

== Sources ==
- Acton, Eliza (1845). Modern Cookery, in All its Branches. London: Longman. OCLC 969499797.
- Born, Wina (1969). Het volkomen vleesboek (in Dutch). OCLC 1068478490.
- Curnonsky (1959). Recettes des provinces de France (in French). Paris: Les Productions de Paris. OCLC 460059864.
- Donselaar, Corri H. Van (1983). Les Viandes à l'honneur (in French). Glarus: Éditions Christophe Colomb. ISBN 288097058X.
- Dumas, Alexandre (1873). Grand dictionnaire de cuisine (in French). Paris: Alphonse Lemerre. OCLC 914210103.
- Escoffier, Auguste (1903). Le Guide culinaire (in French). Paris: Bibliothèque Professionelle. OCLC 970757923.
- Fowler, H. W. (1926). A Dictionary of Modern English Usage. Oxford: Oxford University Press. OCLC 1441754735.
- Fowler, H. W; Sir Ernest Gowers (1965). A Dictionary of Modern English Usage. Oxford: Oxford University Press. ISBN 0198691157.
- Hess, Olga (1952). Viennese Cooking. New York: Crown Publishers. OCLC 721282964.
- Johnson, Edgar (1952). Charles Dickens: His Tragedy and Triumph. OCLC 928107211.
- Norton Ray, Gordon (1955). Thackeray: The Uses of Adversity. New York: McGraw Hill. OCLC 1069777047.
- Ochorowicz-Monatowa, Maria (1958). Polish Cookery. New York: Crown Publishers. OCLC 1311956270.
- Pearson, Hesketh (1951). Dizzy: The Life And Personality of Benjamin Disraeli, Earl of Beaconsfield. New York: Harper. OCLC 400127.
- Pratz, Claire de (1956). French Home Cooking. London: Arco. OCLC 1068478490.
- Root, Waverley (1958). The Food of France. London: Cassell. OCLC 752644861.
- Sandburg, Carl (1951). Abraham Lincoln The War Years. New York: Harcourt. OCLC 643855629.
- Saint-Ange, Madame (1956) [1927]. La Cuisine de Madame Saint-Ange (in French). Paris: Larousse. OCLC 1150069417.
