= Kerry Diamond =

American magazine editor

Kerry Diamond is a founder and editorial director of Cherry Bombe, a magazine that focuses on women in the food and beverage industry.

== Early life ==
Diamond is from Staten Island, New York. She graduated from State University of New York at Plattsburgh.

== Career ==
Diamond started her career at Women's Wear Daily, Coach, Lancome, and Harper's Bazaar.

Diamond met Cherry Bombe co-founder Claudia Wu while working together at Harpers Bazaar. In October 2017 Cherry Bombe: The Cookbook was released, authored by Diamond and Wu. Diamond is the host of Radio Cherry Bombe, a weekly podcast.
