= Parwana (2003 film) =

2003 Indian film by Deepak Bahry

- Directed by: Deepak Bahry
- Written by: Tanveer Khan (dialogues)
- Screenplay by: Deepak Bahry
- Story by: Rajeev Kaul, Praful Parikh
- Produced by: Deepak Bahry
- Starring: Ajay Devgn; Ameesha Patel; Pooja Batra
- Cinematography: Damodar Naidu
- Edited by: Nasir Hakim Ansari
- Music by: Sanjeev Darshan
- Production company: Bahry Films
- Release date: 12 September 2003
- Running time: 140 minutes
- Country: India
- Language: Hindi
- Budget: ₹67.5 million
- Box office: ₹70.6 million

Parwana (translation: moth) is a 2003 Indian Hindi-language action thriller film directed by Deepak Bahry. The film stars Ajay Devgn, Ameesha Patel and Pooja Batra.

== Summary ==
Shahtaj belongs to a group of Jihad freedom fighters who have taken it upon themselves to free Kashmir from the clutches of India. They are now ready to terrorize Bombay, but before that could happen, Shahtaj is captured by Indian intelligence agents and held in an interrogation cell. When he is being transported to another facility, his colleagues dramatically help him escape via a helicopter. Now, there is virtually no one who can stop Shahtaj and his men from carrying out terrorist attacks on Bombay during the Ganesh Visharjan day, when thousands of people converge near the beaches to immerse Bhagwan Shri Ganesh into the sea. Then a bumbling conman and thief, who calls himself Parwana, robs the suitcase that contains the bomb. Shortly thereafter, Parwana is arrested by Police Inspector Hardev Singh Haryanvi and held for interrogation. Hardev comes to the defense of Parwana and guarantees that he has nothing to do with the bomb and is not a terrorist. Then Parwana escapes, Hardev is shot and hospitalized in critical condition, and the police have launched a manhunt for Parwana, who is now being labeled as a terrorist. In the meantime, Shahtaj and his men also group together to hunt down Parwana, who has the bomb in his possession. Looks like all exits are closed for Parwana, and he is all set to detonate himself with the explosive on his person.

== Cast ==
- Ajay Devgn as Parwana
- Amisha Patel as Pooja
- Pooja Batra as Parwana's associate
- Jagdeep as Seth Malpani
- Kader Khan as Ismailbhai Muskurahat
- Sharat Saxena as Shahtaj
- Sadashiv Amrapurkar as Inspector Hardev Singh Haryanvi
- Gulshan Grover as Inspector Tode
- Sayaji Shinde as Yashwantrao Waghmare
- Akhilendra Mishra as Police Commissioner Tyagi
- Nawab Shah as P.P. Yadav
- Ketki Dave as Kamini Haryanvi
- Gajendra Chouhan as Ganesh fest dancer
- Brijesh Tiwari as Hotel Manager

== Soundtrack ==
Music by Sanjeev Darshan.

#	Title	Singer(s)
1	"Pyar To Hota Hai Pyar"	Udit Narayan, Alka Yagnik
2	"Jindri"	Udit Narayan, Preeti Uttam
3	"Duniya Mein Aaye Ho"	Vinod Rathod
4	"Jo Pallu Gira Diya"	Jaspinder Narula, Sarika, Farid Sabri
5	"Deva Ho Deva"	M. G. Sreekumar, Aslam Sabri
6	"Tumko Hi Chahenge Hum"	Saud Khan, Prabha Bharati
