= Cocina =

Cocina may refer to:

- Cocina (magazine)
- Playa de la Cocina, a beach in Spain
