= Order of the Holy Spirit =

French order of chivalry

Order of the Holy Spirit Ordre du Saint-Esprit
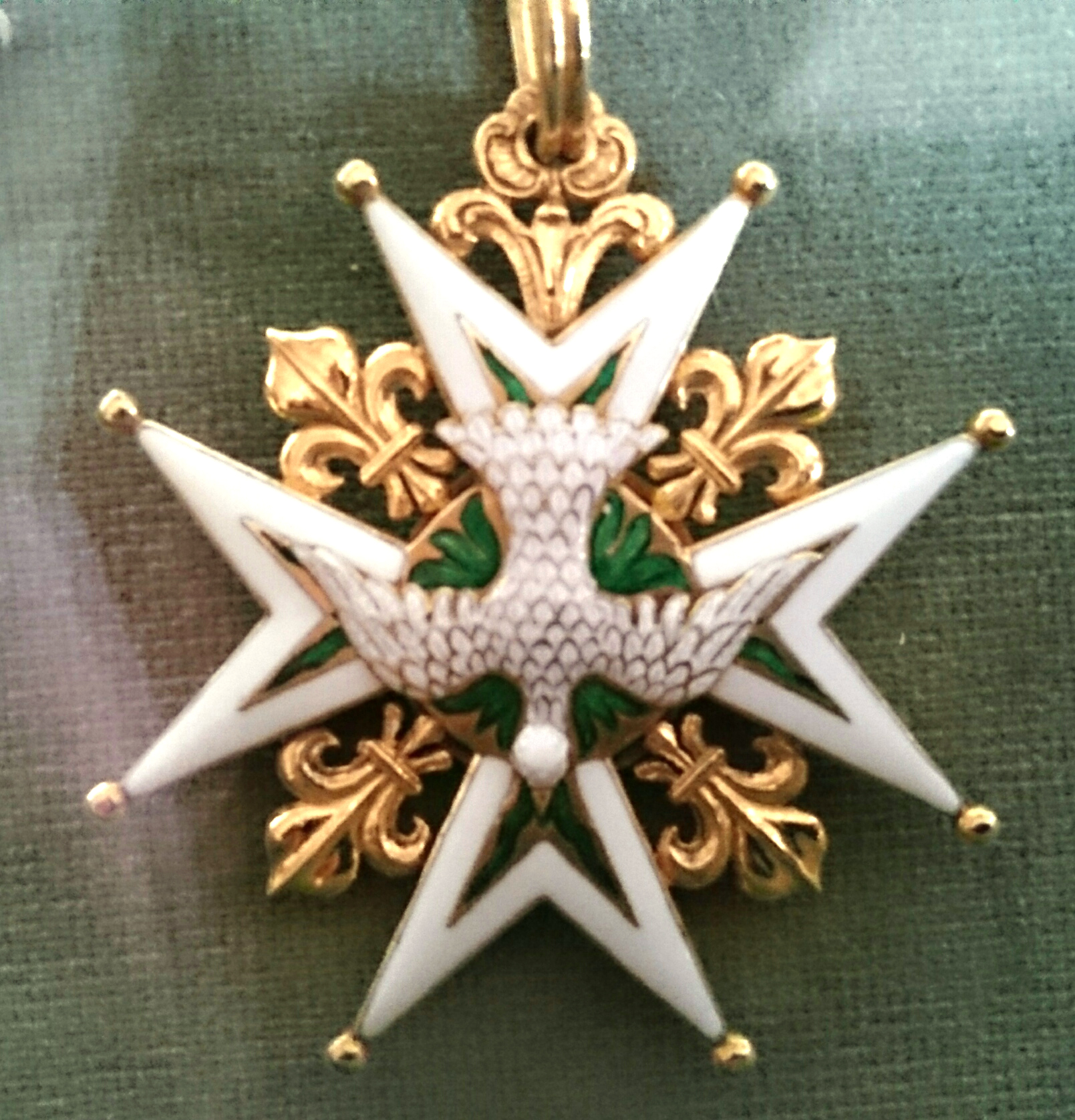
- Badge of the Order

Awarded by the (Kingdom of France) King of France
- Type: Dynastic order
- Established: 31 December 1578
- Royal house: House of France
- Religious affiliation: Catholicism
- Ribbon: Light blue
- Motto: Latin: Duce et Auspice
- Status: Abolished in 1830 after the July Revolution; Recognised as a dynastic order of chivalry by the ICOC
- Founder: Henry III of France
- Grand Master: Disputed: Prince Louis, Duke of Anjou; Jean, Count of Paris

Precedence
- Next (lower): Order of Saint Michael
- Ribbon of the Order

The Order of the Holy Spirit (French: Ordre du Saint-Esprit; sometimes translated into English as the Order of the Holy Ghost) is a French order of chivalry founded by Henry III of France in 1578. Today, it is a dynastic order under the House of France.

It should not be confused with the Congregation of the Holy Ghost or with the religious Order of the Holy Ghost. It was the senior chivalric order of France by precedence, although not by age, since the Order of Saint Michael was established more than a century earlier.

Although officially abolished by the government authorities in 1830 following the July Revolution, its activities carried on. It is still recognised by the International Commission for Orders of Chivalry.

== History ==
Prior to the creation of the Order of the Holy Spirit in 1578 by King Henry III, the senior order of chivalry in France had been the Order of Saint Michael. The idea flashed to him in Venice, where he had seen the original manuscript of an Order of the Saint Esprit or Droit Desir founded in 1353 by Louis of Anjou, titular king of Jerusalem and Sicily and husband of Joanna, queen of Naples and countess of Provence, and placed under the protection of St. Nicholas of Bari, whose image was reproduced on the pendant of the collar. Henry III realised that the Order of St. Michael had inflated and degraded during the civil wars, and therefore decided to place the new order of the Holy Spirit alongside it and to attribute them together; for this reason who was created knight of the Holy Spirit was called chevalier des ordres du roi. Its membership was initially restricted to a small number of powerful princes and nobles, but this increased dramatically due to the pressures of the Wars of Religion.

At the beginning of the reign of Henry III, the Order of Saint Michael had several hundred living members, ranging from kings to bourgeois. Recognising that the order had been significantly devalued, Henry III founded the Order of the Holy Spirit on December 31, 1578, thereby creating a two-tier system: the new order would be reserved for princes and powerful nobles, whilst the Order of Saint Michael would be for less eminent servants of the Crown. The new order was dedicated to the Holy Spirit to commemorate the fact that Henry III was elected as King of Poland (1573) and inherited the throne of France (1574) on two Pentecosts.

The new order was also identified with the "Order of the Knot" (Ordre du Nœud, also known as Ordre du Saint-Esprit au Droit Désir "Order of the Holy Spirit of the Right Will") which had been founded in 1352/3 by Louis I of Naples. This had been one of the short-lived chivalric orders popular among the high nobility at the time. The statutes of the 14th-century order are preserved as BNF Fr 4274. An elaborate facsimile of this manuscript was produced under Louis XIV.

During the French Revolution, the Order of the Holy Spirit was officially abolished by the French government, along with all other chivalric orders of the Ancien Régime, although the exiled Louis XVIII continued to acknowledge it. Following the Bourbon Restoration, the order was officially revived and a number were awarded for the 1825 Coronation of Charles X, only to be abandoned by the Orleanist Louis-Philippe I following the July Revolution in 1830. Since 1883, both the Orléanist and Legitimist pretenders to the French throne have continued to nominate members of the order, long after the abolition of the French monarchy itself.

== Composition ==
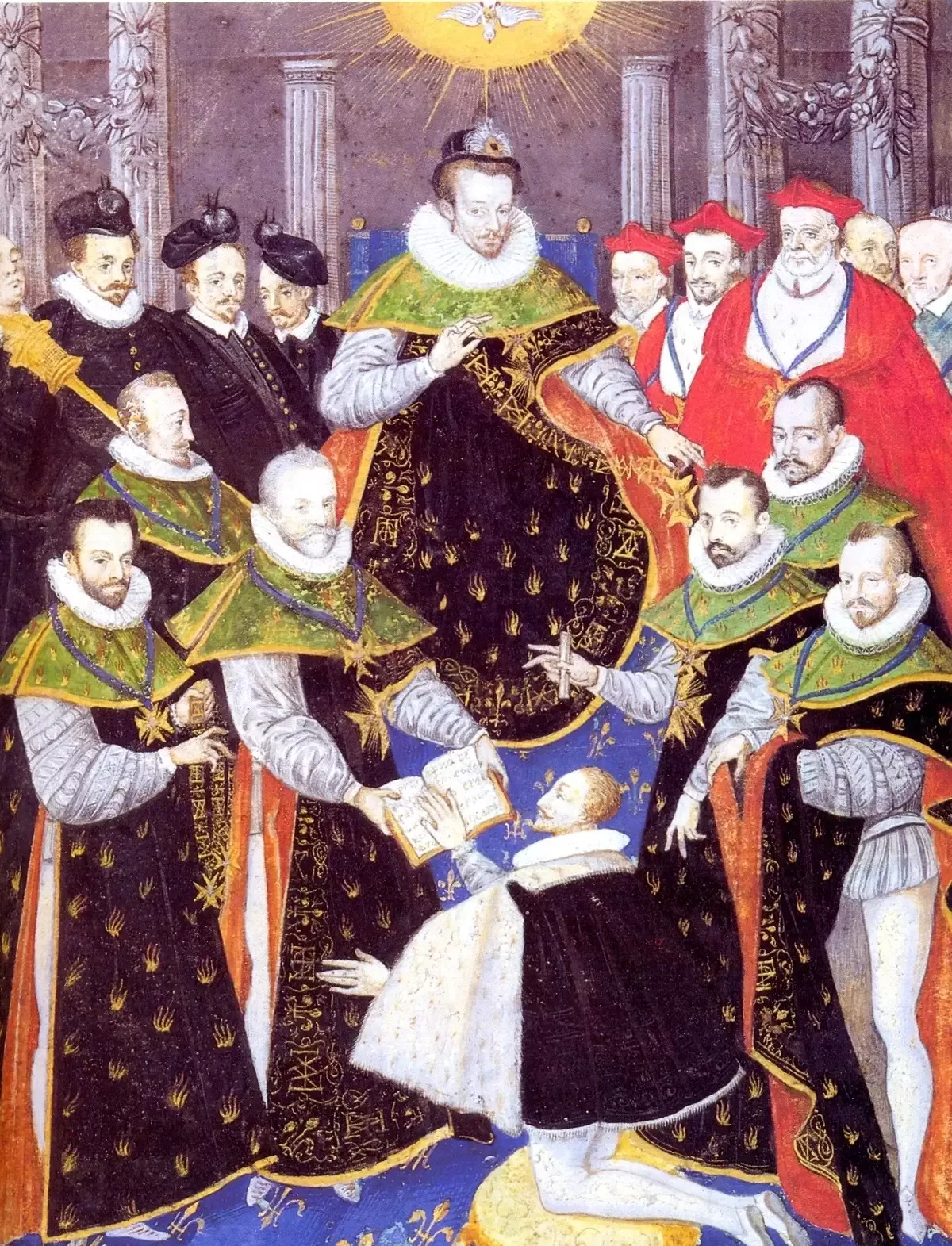
Louis Gonzaga, Duke of Nevers was the first knight to receive the order

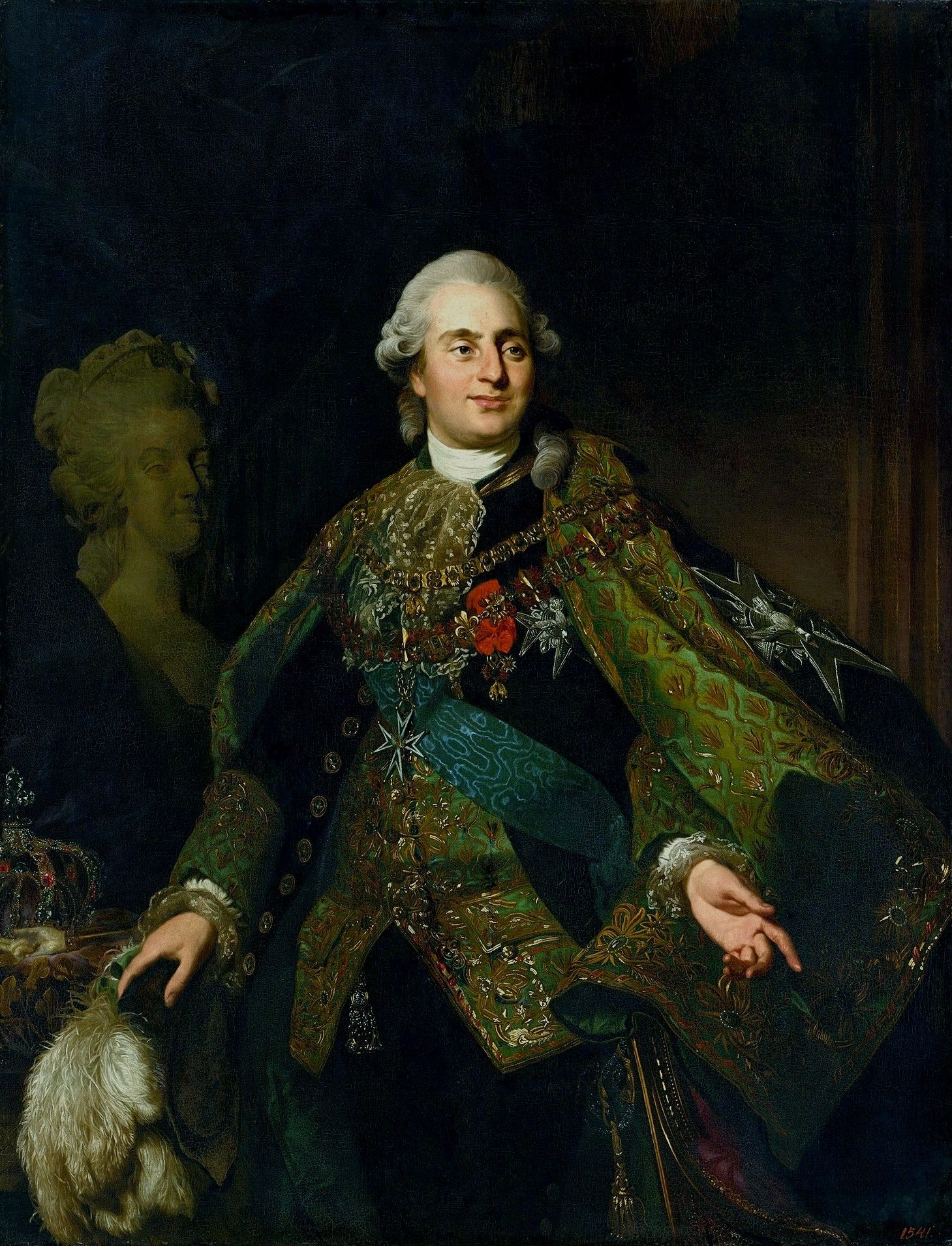
King Louis XVI in the habit of the Order of the Holy Spirit, by Alexandre Roslin.

The King of France was the Sovereign and Grand Master (Souverain Grand Maître), and he made all appointments to the order. Members of the order can be split into three categories:

- 8 Ecclesiastic members;
- 4 Officers;
- 100 Knights.

Initially, four of the ecclesiastic members had to be cardinals, whilst the other four had to be archbishops or prelates. This was later relaxed so that all eight had to be either cardinals, archbishops or prelates.

Members of the order had to be Catholic and had to be able to demonstrate three degrees of nobility. The minimum age for members was 35, although there were some exceptions:

- Children of the king were members from birth, but they were not received into the order until they were 12;
- Princes of the Blood could be admitted to the order from the age of 16;
- Foreign royalty could be admitted to the order from the age of 25.

All knights of the order were also members of the Order of Saint Michael. As such, they were generally known by the term Chevalier des Ordres du Roi (i.e. "Knight of the Royal Orders"), instead of the more lengthy Chevalier de Saint-Michel et Chevalier du Saint-Esprit (i.e. "Knight of Saint Michael and Knight of the Holy Spirit").

== Officers ==
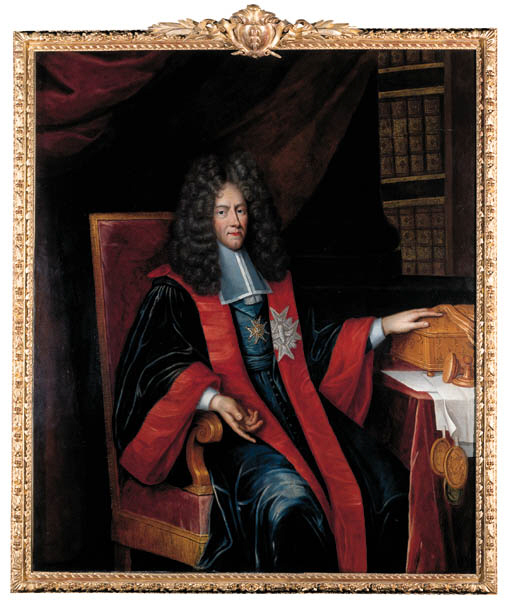
Louis Phélypeaux, comte de Pontchartrain is wearing the cross and star of the Order of the Holy Spirit

The order had its own officers. They were responsible for the ceremonies and the administration of the order.

Officers of the order were as follows:

- Chancellor;
- Provost and Master of Ceremonies;
- Treasurer;
- Clerk (greffier).

== Vestments and accoutrements ==
The symbol of the order is known as the Cross of the Holy Spirit (this is a Maltese Cross). At the periphery, the eight points of the cross are rounded, and between each pair of arms there is a fleur-de-lis. Imposed on the centre of the cross is a dove. The eight rounded corners represent the Beatitudes, the four fleur-de-lis represent the Gospels, the twelve petals represent the Apostles, and the dove signifies the Holy Spirit. The Cross of the Holy Spirit was worn hung from a blue riband ("Le cordon bleu").

== Cordon Bleu ==
Due to the blue riband from which the Cross of the Holy Spirit was hung, the knights became known as Les Cordons Bleus. Allegedly, the banquets after ceremonial occasions were so famous that the expression cordon bleu became synonymous with high quality haute cuisine and, over time, extended to refer to other distinctions of the highest class. The culinary magazine La Cuisinière Cordon Bleu refers to the ribbon, as well as the eponymous network of hospitality and culinary schools. In modern English usage, cordon bleu (/ˌkɔː.dɒ̃ˈblɜː/, US also /ˌkɔːr.dɒ̃ˈbluː/) is used as an adjective for chefs who are able to cook food to the highest standard as well as the food itself. Blue Riband sporting events are also sometimes associated with the cordon bleu.

== Habit and insignia ==
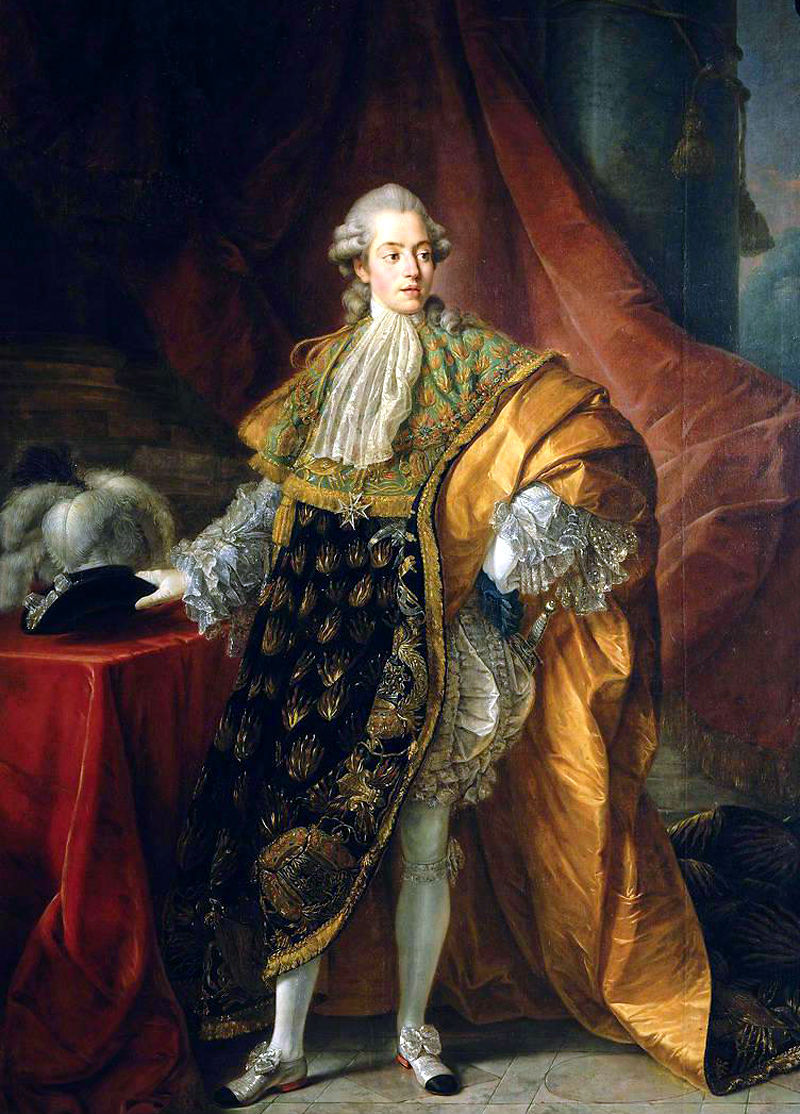
Charles-Philippe, comte d'Artois in the habit of the Order

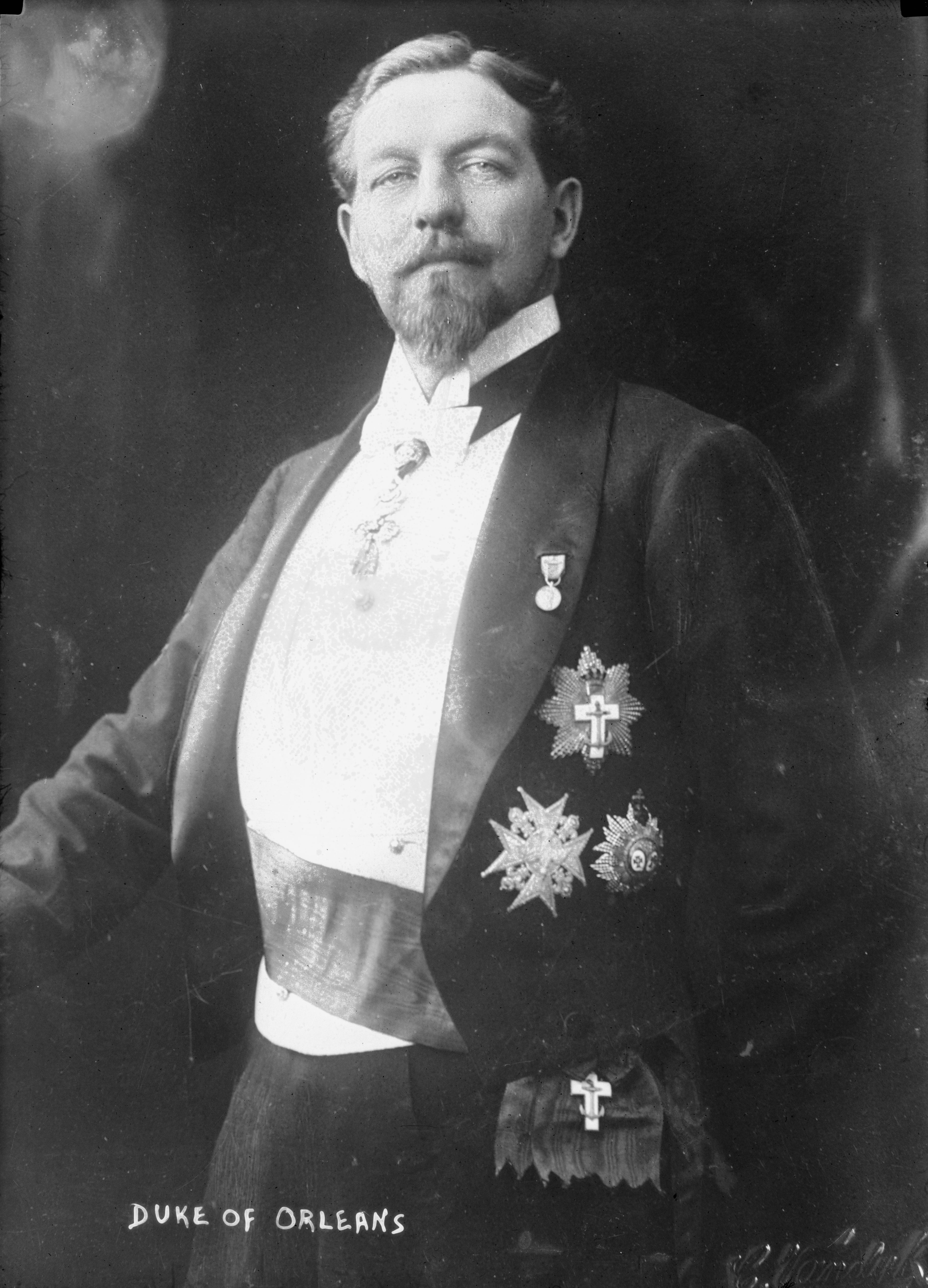
Prince Philippe, duc d'Orléans wearing the breast star of the Order

The badge of the Order is a gold Maltese cross with white borders, each of the eight points ending in a gold ball (points boutonnées) and with a gold fleur-de-lys between each adjacent pair of its arms. At the center of the cross, was set a white dove descending (i.e., with its wings and head pointing downward) surrounded by green flames. The back of this cross worn by the knights was the same as the front except with the medallion of the Order of Saint Michael at the center rather than the dove and flames (those of ecclesiastical members were the same on the back as on the front). During the ceremonies, the cross of officers and commanders officers was attached to a collar of links of gold fleur-de-lis alternating with links consisting of a white enameled letter H (the first initial of name of the founder) crowned with a gold French royal crown, with identical crowns on either side of it or alternately with a trophy of weapons. Each of these links was surrounded with red enamel flames forming a square around it. More generally, the cross was suspended from a large ribbon of color moirée blue sky, hence the nickname cordon bleu the knights wore.

For the ceremonies of the Order and when the knights of the Order made their Communion, the knights wore a long black velvet mantle sprinkled with embroidered gold and red flames and with a representation of the collar round its edges embroidered in gold, red and silver. Like the royal mantle, this mantle opened on the right side and just as an ermine shoulder cape covered the top of the royal mantle, a shoulder cape of pale green velvet with the same embroidery but smaller was worn over this mantle and formed the upper part of it. Both the mantle proper and the shoulder cape were lined with a yellowish orange satin. The mantle was worn over a white coat (with the star of the Order embroidered on the left breast), waistcoat and puffed hose, heavily embroidered with silver. A black hat with a white plume completed the dress. The star of the Order had the same design as the front of the badge, but embroidered in silver (later a medal star in silver was used) on both the knights' coats and their vests.

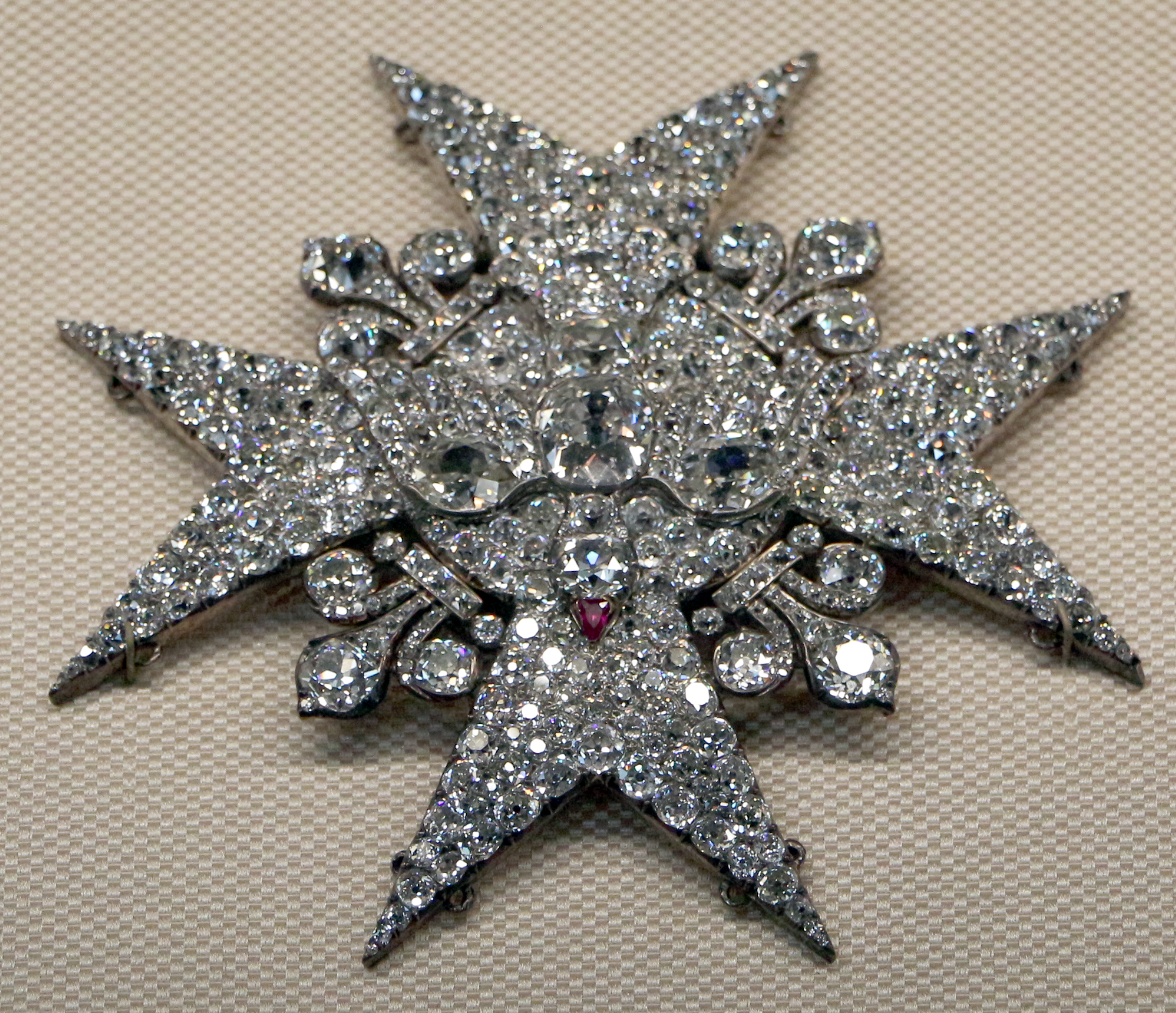
Breast star of the Order with diamonds, c. 1750

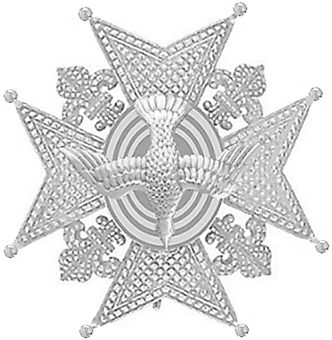
Breast star from the Bourbon Restoration

The collar shown in the arms of France and Navarre

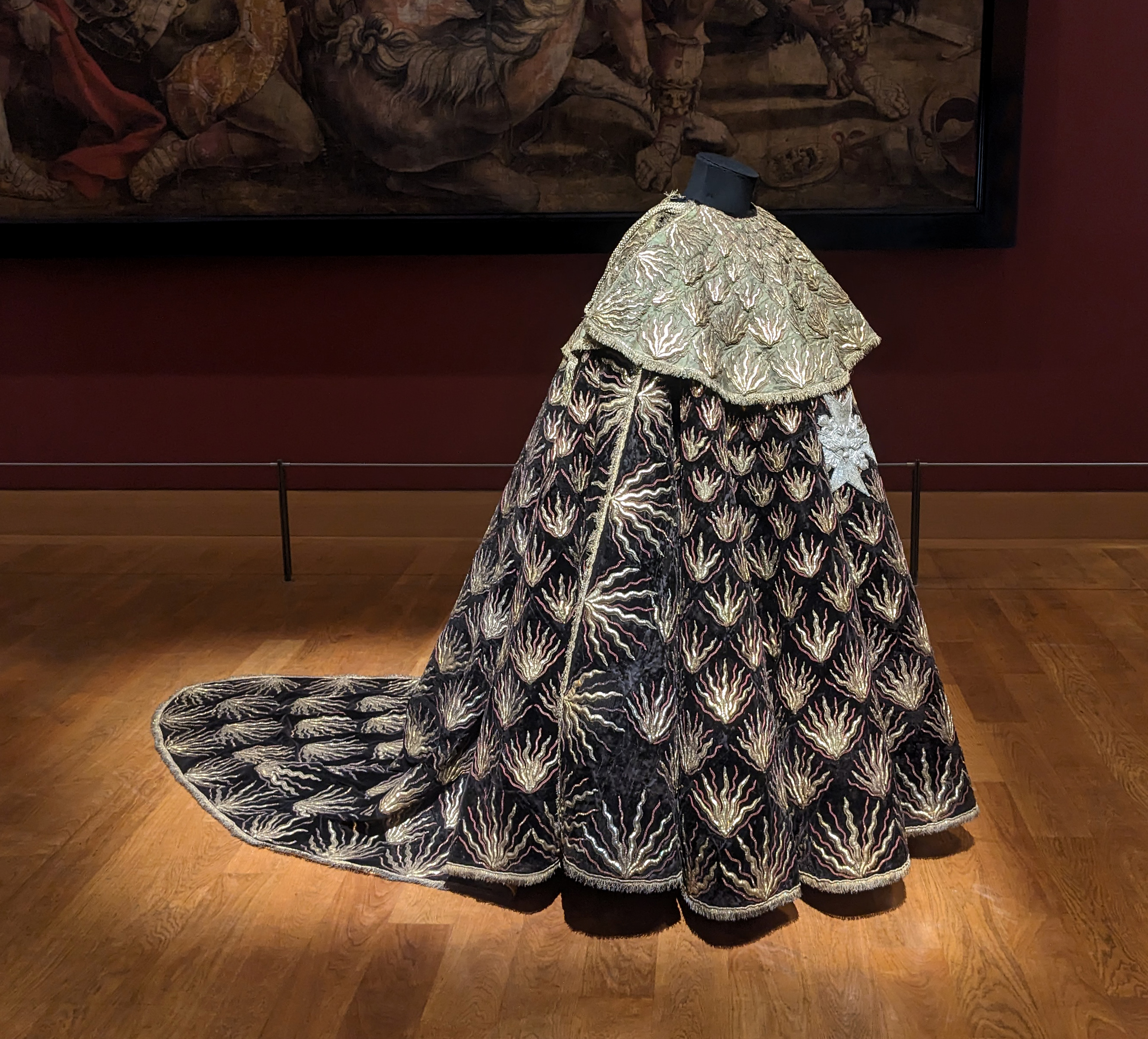
Ceremonial robe of the Order of the Holy Spirit

== Gallery ==
Portraits of some Knights of the Order of the Holy Spirit wearing their insignia as a saltire or a sash.

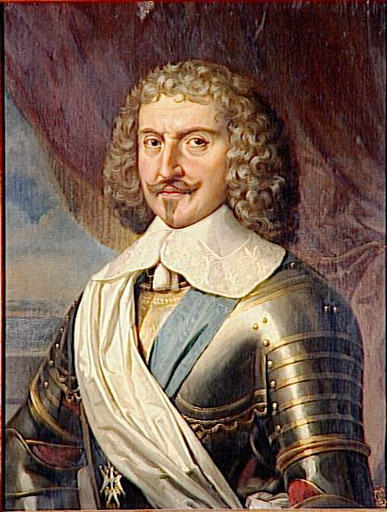
François Annibal d'Estrées

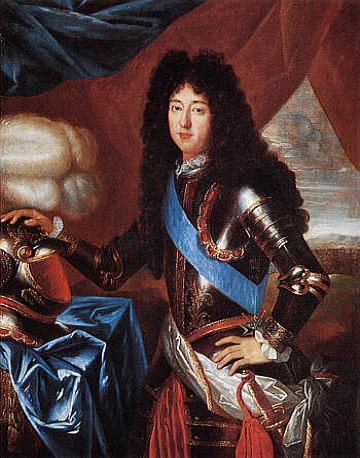
Philippe I, Duke of Orléans.

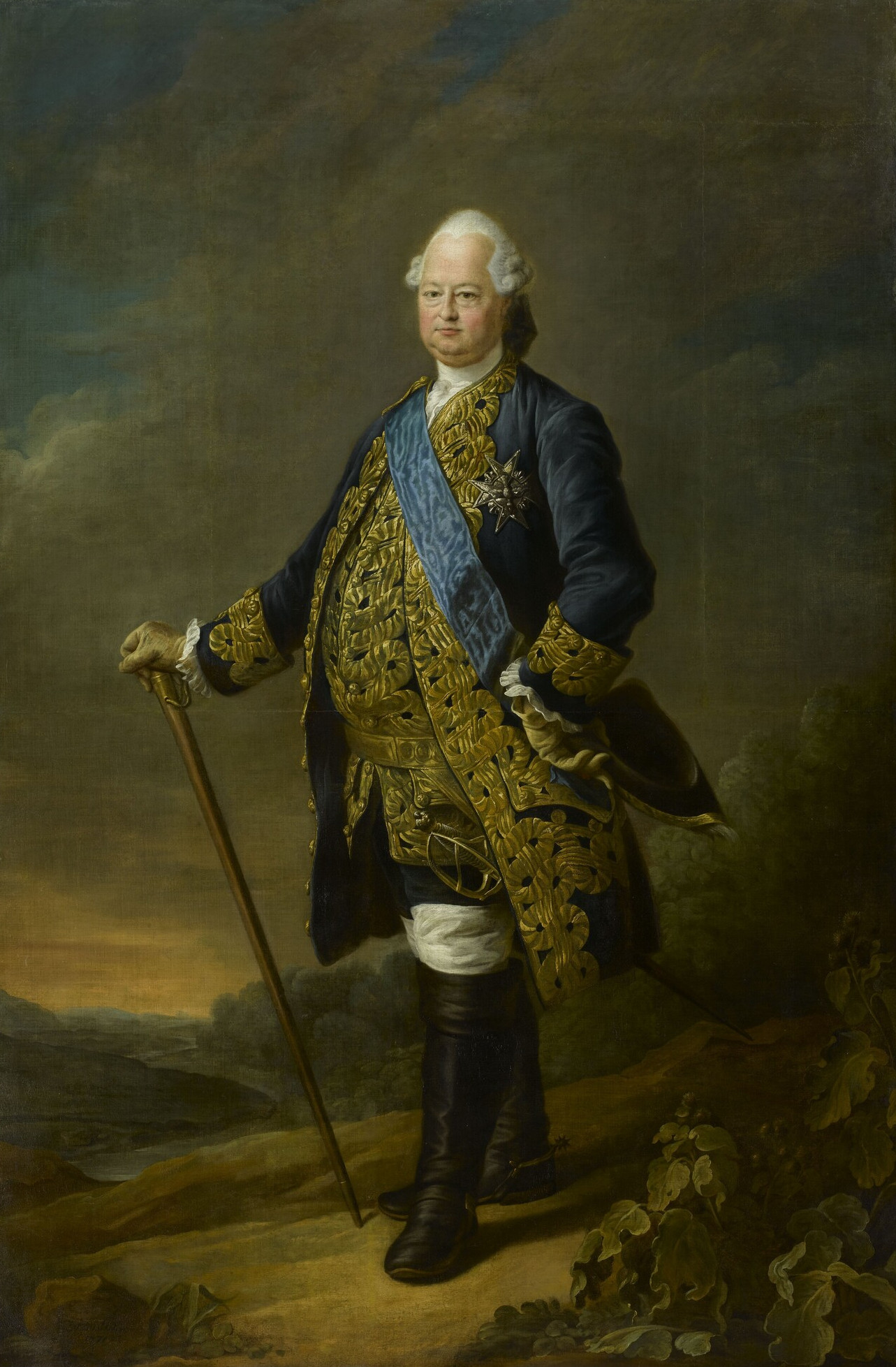
Louis de Bourbon-Conde, Comte de Clermont

Collar of the knights of the order.

Portraits of some Commanders of the Order of the Holy Spirit wearing their insignia in saltire.

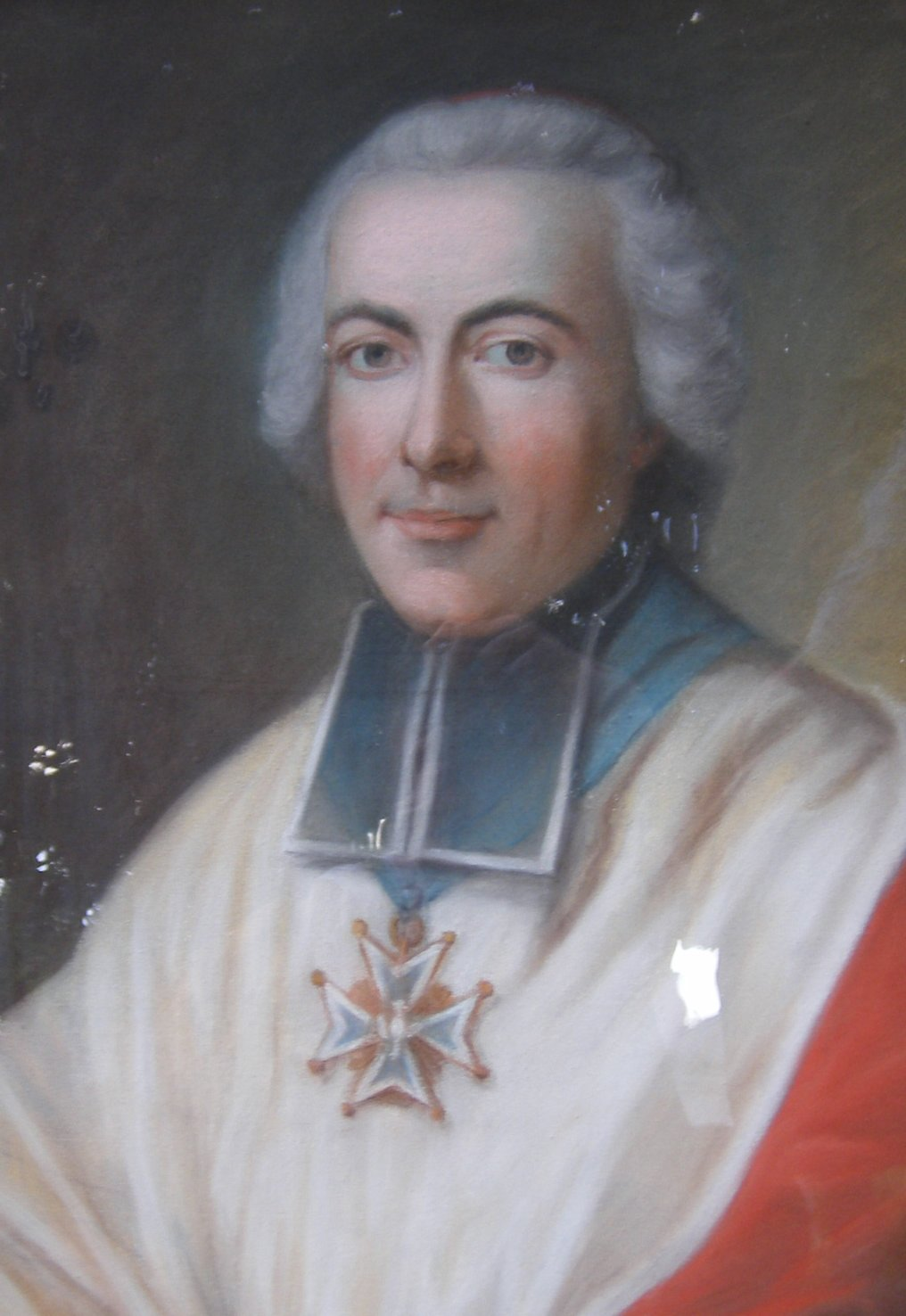
Jean-François-Joseph de Rochechouart, Bishop of Laon

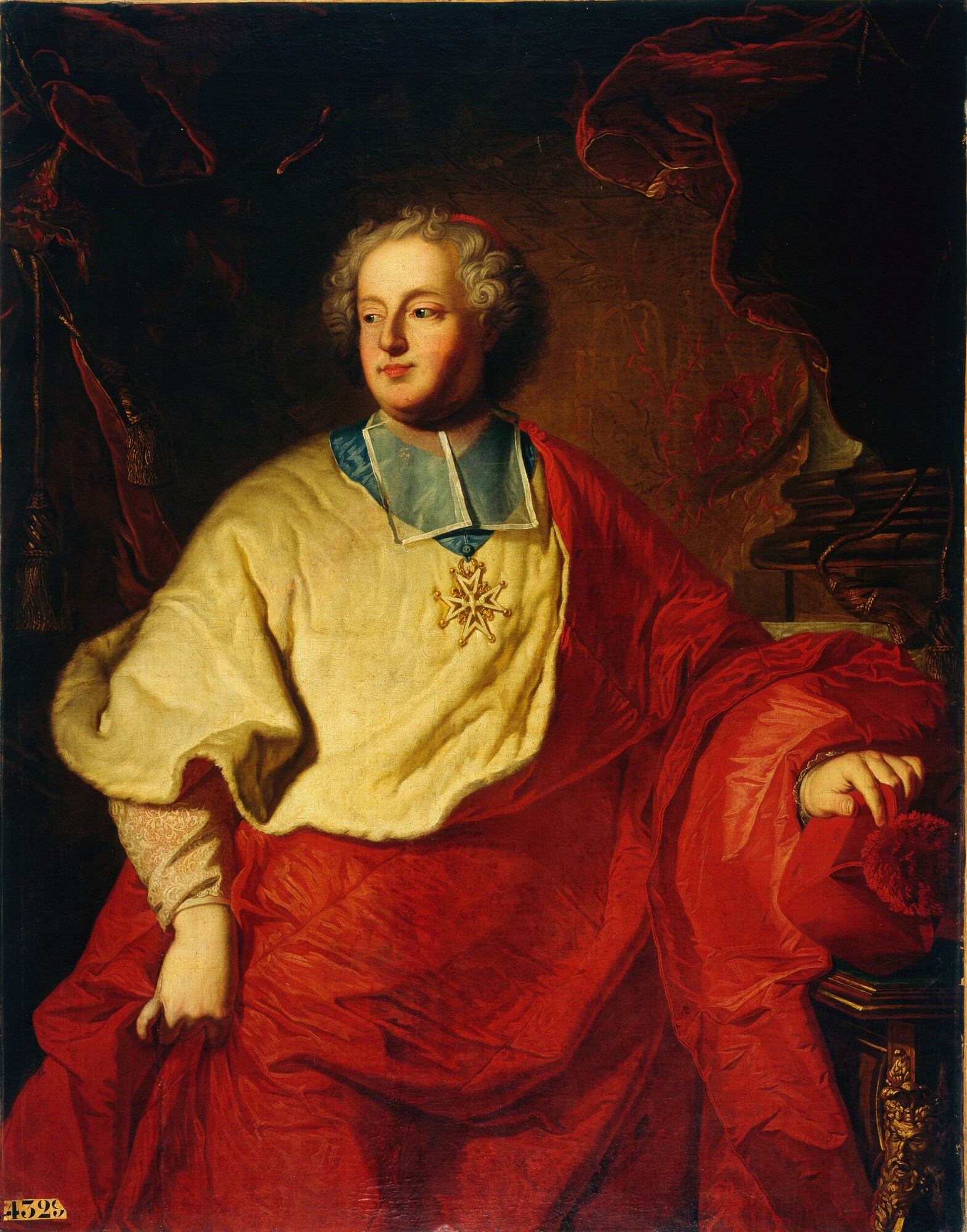
Armand-Gaston-Maximilien de Rohan-Soubise, Bishop of Strasbourg.

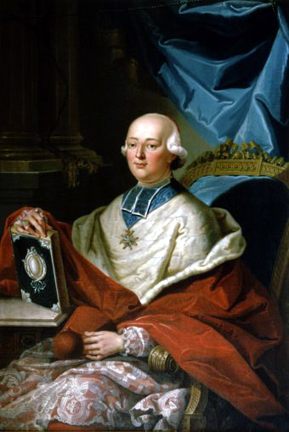
Louis-René-Édouard, Prince de Rohan.

Cross of the Order always worn as a saltire by ecclesiastics.

== Special privileges ==
In France, red or green sealing wax was used for the royal seal on documents requiring a royal seal. Only in documents relating to the Order of the Holy Spirit was white wax used for this royal seal.

== See also ==
- Huguenot cross
- List of the Knights of the Order of the Holy Spirit

== Bibliography ==
- Jean Vergnet-Ruiz, "Les peintures de l’Ordre du Saint-Esprit", in La Revue du Louvre et des Musées de France, 1962, no 1, pp. 155–164.
- Mary Levkoff, "L'art cérémonial de l'Ordre du Saint-Esprit sous Henri III", in Bulletin de la Société de l'histoire de l'art français, 1987, pp. 7–23.
- Daniel Alcouffe, « À propos de l'orfèvrerie commandée par Henri III pour l'ordre du Saint-Esprit », Hommage à Hubert Landais. Études sur l'art du Moyen Âge et de la Renaissance, sur l'histoire du goût et des collections, Paris, Réunion des musées nationaux, 1987, pp. 135–142.
- Daniel Alcouffe, "L'Ordre du Saint-Esprit : la chapelle", dans La Revue du Louvre et des Musées de France, 1994, no 1, pp. 29–42.
- Michel Popoff, "Armorial de l'ordre du Saint-Esprit". Paris : Le Léopard d'or, 1996.
- Patrick Spilliaert, Les insignes de l'ordre du Saint-Esprit, Que nous apprennent les archives du musée de la Légion d'honneur sur les insignes de l'ordre du Saint-Esprit ?, in Bulletin no 12 de la Société des amis du musée national de la Légion d'honneur et des ordres de chevalerie, 2009, pp. 4–33.
- Agnès Bos and Antoinette Villa, "Éléments de technique et de vocabulaire, sur la broderie d'or à l'époque moderne, autour d'un manteau de l'ordre du Saint-Esprit conservé au musée du Louvre", in Technè 41 (2015), pp. 55–64.
- Patrick Spilliaert, Les colliers et croix de l'ordre du Saint-Esprit sous l'Ancien Régime, in Bulletin n°18 de la Société des amis du musée de la Légion d'honneur et des ordres de chevalerie, 2015, pp. 14–31.
- Patrick Spilliaert, The insignia of the Order of the Holy Spirit, 1578–1830, in The journal of the Orders and Medals Research Society (OMRS), June 2016.
- Agnès Bos, "Art et liturgie au temps d’Henri III. À propos d'un élément textile de la chapelle de l’ordre du Saint-Esprit", in Bulletin de la Société nationale des Antiquaires de France (2016), pp. 87–100.
- Patrick Spilliaert, Les insignes de l'ordre du Saint-Esprit, colliers, croix, plaques, chapelets et autres ornements distribués à Messieurs les chevaliers, prélats et officiers des Ordres du roi. Paris : Le Léopard d'or, 2016.
- Lenaïg Roumegou, «L'Ordre du Saint-Esprit sous Louis XIV : un instrument au service du pouvoir (1643–1715) », thèse de l'École nationale des Chartes, réalisée sous la direction d’Olivier Poncet, 2017.
- Michel Popoff et Patrick Spilliaert, "Hommage à Hervé Pinoteau (1927–2020), autour de l'ordre du Saint-Esprit". Paris: Le Léopard d'or, 2020.
- Agnès Bos, "Le livre des évangiles de l'ordre du Saint-Esprit. Redécouverte d'un manuscrit", in Bulletin de la Société nationale des Antiquaires de France, 2022, pp. 35-60.
- Agnès Bos, "La conservation-restauration des textiles de l’ordre du Saint-Esprit du XVIe siècle à la Révolution", in Technè, n° 60, 2026, pp. 10-15.
- Nathalie Schluck, "La « toille d’or lamée » brodée pour la chapelle de l’ordre du Saint-Esprit : les apports de son étude technique", in Technè, n° 60, 2026, pp. 16-22.
- Violaine Blaise, Thalia Bouzid, Raphaëlle Déjean, Maëlle Toubert, "La restauration des ornements de la chapelle de l’ordre du Saint-Esprit : une solution pour le refixage de l’or nué", in Technè, n° 60, 2026, pp. 23-29.
- Anne Labourdette, Antoinette Villa, "Le nettoyage des broderies métalliques des textiles de l’ordre du Saint-Esprit :les raisons d’un double choix", in Technè, n° 60, 2026, pp. 30-35.
