= Robert McCarrison =

Irish physician and nutritionist

- Born: 15 March 1878; Portadown
- Died: 18 May 1960 (aged 82); Oxford
- Occupations: Physician, nutritionist

Major-General Sir Robert McCarrison, CIE, FRCP (15 March 1878 – 18 May 1960) was a Northern Ireland physician and nutritionist in the Indian Medical Service, who was made a Companion of the Indian Empire (CIE) in 1923, received a knighthood in July 1933, and was appointed as Honourable Physician to the King in 1935.

McCarrison was born in Portadown, in County Armagh, Northern Ireland. He qualified in Medicine at Queen's College, Belfast in 1900. He joined the Indian Medical Service and was posted as Medical Officer to Indian troops guarding the mountainous Northern Frontiers. He was promoted to Captain in January 1904, to Major in July 1912, Lieutenant-Colonel in January 1918, Colonel from 1929, and to Major-General in July 1933. He retired from the Indian Medical Service on 19 August 1935. McCarrison's research in India on the cause of goitre won widespread recognition and in 1913 he was promoted to do research. In 1928 he became Director of Nutritional Research in India, where he remained until his retirement from the Indian Medical Service in 1935, when he returned to England, settling at Oxford.

== Pioneer in nutrition research ==
McCarrison carried out the very first experiments to demonstrate the effect of nutrition on the epidemiology of disease.

McCarrison is credited with being the first to experimentally demonstrate the effect of deficient dietaries upon animal tissues and organs. He also carried out human experiments aimed at identifying the cause of goitre, and included himself as one of the experimental subjects. Much of McCarrison's work was pioneering. His 1921 book Studies in Deficiency Disease was considered notable at the time, being published at a time when knowledge of vitamins and their role in nutrition was crystallizing. McCarrison himself noted that prior to publication of his studies on the pathogenesis of deficiency disease "no systemic post-mortem examination of animals fed on food deficient in vitamin B had ever been made; the histopathological effects of such food on the various systems of the body were wholly unknown; above all, its effects on the gastro-intestinal tract and the organs of digestion and assimilation, and the significance of these effects for clinical medicine, were wholly unsuspected".

At age 23, McCarrison went to India, where he spent 30 years on nutritional problems. He attained the rank of major-general in the Indian Medical Service, and founded the Nutritional Research Laboratories in Coonoor. After retiring from the Indian Medical Service in 1935, he gave a series of Cantor lectures at the Royal Society of Arts, about the influence of diet on health. This comprised three lectures delivered on successive Mondays at the Society. The first lecture focused on the processes of nutrition; the second, on food essentials and their relationship to bodily structure and function; the third on disease prevention and physique improvement by attention to diet. The lectures were subsequently published in book form under the title Nutrition and Health, and at the time of the third edition in 1962, were still not seen as "dated", with the advances of the preceding 25 years largely filling the details of the principles previously recognised by McCarrison.

"McCarrison's work on goitre, cretinism, and thyroid, begun in the western Himalayas in 1902, generated scores of scientific publications during the following thirty-five years", While McCarrison's work is often considered the start of serious studies of goitre and cretinism in South Asia, it was preceded by that of Commissioner David Scott at Rangur in north-east India around 1825, and was investigated by Mountford Bramley at Kathmandu in 1832.

In 1918, McCarrison founded the Beri-Beri Enquiry Unit in a single room laboratory at the Pasteur Institute in Conoor, India. He was invalided to Britain from 1920–1922, and in 1923 the enquiry was axed on financial grounds. It was restored two years later as the Deficiency Disease Inquiry, which McCarrison headed from 1925-1929. Around 1928-29, this developed further into the Nutrition Research Laboratories (NRL. Renamed the National Institute of Nutrition in 1969), with McCarrison as its first director, until his retirement in 1935. In 1926, as head of the Deficiency Diseases Inquiry, McCarrison submitted written and oral evidence on malnutrition to the Royal Commission on Agriculture in India. The primary objective of McCarrison's submission was to indicate the significance of malnutrition "as a cause of physical inefficiency and ill-health among the masses in India"; the relationship between nutrition and agriculture; and "the necessity for closer co-ordination of nutritional, medical, veterinary and agricultural research" in India. McCarrison's submission had impact. "A decade later, when the Commission's chairman, Lord Linlithgow, became Viceroy of India he showed a personal interest in nutrition, pushing it to the top of the research agenda. In 1936 a Nutrition Advisory Committee was established and roughly a tenth of IRFA's annual grants went to fund nutrition research at Coonoor and Calcutta".

== Retirement from India ==
After the Second World War, from 1945 to 1955, McCarrison served as director of postgraduate medical education at Oxford University.

== Personal life ==
In 1906 he married Helen Stella Johnston, to whom he was still married at the time of his death.

== Legacy ==
- The National Institute of Nutrition in Hyderabad, India, continues to pay tribute to is origins in 1928 under McCarrison.
- McCarrison is grouped, along with Sir Albert Howard and Richard St. Barbe Baker, as one of three progenitors of the organic agriculture movement.

=== McCarrison Society ===
In 1966, a group of doctors, dentists and veterinarians, interested in the promotion of nutrition and health, founded the McCarrison Society in honour of his efforts, with a Scottish group established in 1981 due to both travel logistics and differing needs in the Scottish population.

The Society aims "to assemble scientific knowledge on nutrition and health that is free from economic and political pressures with the object of securing the physical and mental health of future generations". The society meetings sometimes raise questions with elusive answers, with speakers presenting material based on scanty, often anectdotal data, inviting criticism that it is "a gathering of cranks". However, "one answer to that criticism is that speakers at MCarrison meetings tend to be rather well qualified. But the main point is that the society has a way of asking questions about the environment - what are we doing to it and what it is doing to us - that are of profound importance". The journal "Nutrition and Health" is the official journal of the McCarrison Society and is listed in PUBMED. The journal was started by members in 1978 with the objective of publishing peer reviewed scientific work and reviews on nutrition and health from academic research workers who were independent of the food and agricultural industries or those with a conflict of interest.

The society's website summarises McCarrison's work thus:

His researches were extensive; they included work on the newly discovered vitamins and on the contrasting disease patterns in the Indian subcontinent. He demonstrated how many common diseases increasingly prevalent in industrial societies were caused simply by diets made defective by extensive food processing, often with the use of chemical additives. He deplored the universal consumption in Britain and America of refined white flour, instead of halite flour, and the substitution of canned, preserved and artificially sweetened products for fresh natural food.

McCarrison's work was widely published in the medical press. He was honoured for his discoveries, but completely ignored by government and the medical profession at a time when medical thought was absorbed in the study of disease rather than on prevention and the promotion of health.

== Publications ==
The following is a selection of works published by McCarrison.^{[a]} To avoid duplication, this does not include works cited, which are to be found in the References section.

- McCarrison, Robert (1906), "Observations on Endemic Goitre in the Chitral and Gilgit Valleys", Medico-Chirurgical Transactions, 89: 437–470, PMC 2038233, PMID 20897060
- McCarrison, R.; Berry, James (1909), "Observations on Endemic Cretinism in the Chitral and Gilgit Valleys", Proceedings of the Royal Society of Medicine, 2 (Medical Section): 1–36, doi:10.1177/003591570900200601, PMC 2046595, PMID 19973738
- McCarrison, R. (13 March 1909), "A Summary of Further Researches on the Etiology of Endemic Goitre", Proceedings of the Royal Society B, 81 (545): 31, Bibcode:1909RSPSB..81...31M, doi:10.1098/rspb.1909.0003, JSTOR 80344
- "Further Researches on the Etiology of Endemic Goitre", QJM: An International Journal of Medicine, 2 (3): 279–288, April 1909
- McCarrison, Robert (1 July 1909), "Observations on the Amoebae in the Intestines of Persons Suffering from Goitre in Gilgit", Journal of Cell Science, s2-53 (212): 723–736, doi:10.1242/jcs.s2-53.212.723 download page
- McCarrison, R. (28 February 1911), "A Summary of Further Experimental Researches on the Etiology of Endemic Goitre. (Second series.)", Proceedings of the Royal Society B, 83 (564): 335–337, Bibcode:1911RSPSB..83..335M, doi:10.1098/rspb.1911.0016
- McCarrison, R. (23 January 1912), "The Vaccine Treatment of Simple Goitre", Proceedings of the Royal Society of Medicine, 5 (Medical Section): 37–52, doi:10.1177/003591571200500704, PMC 2004943, PMID 19976042
- McCarrison, R. (1914), "Nervous Cretinism", Proceedings of the Royal Society of Medicine, 7 (Section for the Study of Disease in Children): 157–164, doi:10.1177/0035915714007019101, PMC 2003241, PMID 19978295. Retrieved 12 August 2010
- McCarrison, R. (1 August 1916), "On the Experimental Production of Congenital Goitre", Proceedings of the Royal Society B, 89 (616): 322–327, Bibcode:1916RSPSB..89..322M, doi:10.1098/rspb.1916.0018, JSTOR 80845
- McCarrison, Robert (1917), "The Thyroid Gland in Health and Disease", Nature, 100 (2507), London: Bailliere, Tindall & Cox: 202–203, Bibcode:1917Natur.100..202H, doi:10.1038/100202a0, PMC 5057548 (Full text at Internet Archive).
- McCarrison, R. (15 February 1919), "The Pathogenesis of Deficiency Disease", British Medical Journal, 1 (3033): 177–178, doi:10.1136/bmj.1.3033.177, PMC 2340752, PMID 20769368 (Online registration to view articles is free).
- McCarrison, R. (12 July 1919), "The Influence of Deficiency of Accessory Food Factors on the Intesting", British Medical Journal, 2 (3054): 36–39, doi:10.1136/bmj.2.3054.36, PMC 2342171, PMID 20769544
- McCarrison, R. (16 August 1919), "The Effects of a Scorbutic Diet on the Adrenal Glands", BMJ, 2 (3059): 200, doi:10.1136/bmj.2.3059.200, PMC 2342542, PMID 20769580
- McCarrison, R. (1 January 1920), "The Genesis of Oedema in Beriberi", Proceedings of the Royal Society B, 91 (636): 103–110, Bibcode:1920RSPSB..91..103M, doi:10.1098/rspb.1920.0003, JSTOR 80789
- McCarrison, R. (21 February 1920), "The Effects of Deficient Dietaries on Monkeys", British Medical Journal, 1 (3086): 249–253, doi:10.1136/bmj.1.3086.249, PMC 2337273, PMID 20769796
- McCarrison, R. (19 June 1920), "Deficiency Disease: With Special Reference to Gastro-intestinal Disorders", British Medical Journal, A British Medical Association Lecture Delivered to the South Wales and Monmouthshire Branch, 1 (3103): 822, 822–2–826, doi:10.1136/bmj.1.3103.822, PMC 2338035
- McCarrison, Robert (14 August 1920), "Dietetic Deficiency And Endocrine Activity, With Special Reference To Deficiency Oedemas", British Medical Journal, 2 (3111): 236–239, JSTOR 20341532
- Studies in Deficiency Disease, London: Henry Frowde and Hodder & Stoughton, 1921 (1945 photo-lithographic reproduction by Lee Foundation for Nutritional Research. Full text at Internet Archive).
  - "Book advertisement", The Canadian Medical Association Journal: i, PMC 1524351
- McCarrison, R. (1 November 1921), "Observations on the Effects of Fat Excess on the Growth and Metamorphosis of Tadpoles", Proceedings of the Royal Society B, 92 (647): 295–303, Bibcode:1921RSPSB..92..295M, doi:10.1098/rspb.1921.0026, JSTOR 81036
- "Faulty Food in Relation to Gastro-intestinal Disorder", Journal of the American Medical Association, 78 (1): 1–8, 7 January 1922, doi:10.1001/jama.1922.02640540007001 (Pay-per-view access).
- McCarrison, R. (4 February 1922), "Fats in Relation to the Genesis of Goitre", British Medical Journal, 1 (3188): 178–181, doi:10.1136/bmj.1.3188.178, PMC 2415366, PMID 20770581
- McCarrison, R. (22 April 1922), "Simple Goitre", British Medical Journal, 1 (3199): 636–637, doi:10.1136/bmj.1.3199.636, PMC 2415977, PMID 20770690
- McCarrison, R. (20 January 1923), "The Function of the Adrenal Glands and its Relation to Concentration of Hydrogen Ions", British Medical Journal, 1 (3238): 101–102, doi:10.1136/bmj.1.3238.101, PMC 2315868, PMID 20770975
- McCarrison, R. (4 August 1923), "The Relation of Faulty Nutrition to the Development of the Epithelioma Contagion of Fowls", British Medical Journal, 2 (3266): 172–172–1, 173–174, doi:10.1136/bmj.2.3266.172, PMC 2317298, PMID 20771246
- McCarrison, R. (1924), "Rice in Relation to Beri-beri in India", Proceedings of the Royal Society of Medicine, 17 (Section of Tropical Diseases and Parasitology): 65–82, doi:10.1177/003591572401702220, PMC 2201295, PMID 19984111
- McCarrison, R. (8 March 1924), "Rice in Relation to Beri-beri in India", British Medical Journal, 1 (3297): 414–420, doi:10.1136/bmj.1.3297.414
- McCarrison, R. (29 March 1924), "The Relation of Manure to the Nutritive and Vitamin Value of Certain Grain", British Medical Journal, 1 (3300): 567–569, doi:10.1136/bmj.1.3300.567, PMC 2304100, PMID 20771526
- McCarrison, R. (1925), "Discussion on Non-specific Disturbances of Health Due to Vitamin Deficiency", Proceedings of the Royal Society of Medicine, 18 (General Reports Section): 3–6, doi:10.1177/003591572501800502, PMC 2202417, PMID 19984363. Retrieved 12 August 2010
- McCarrison, R. (13 June 1925), "A British Medical Association Lecture On Some Problems Of Thyroid Disease: Delivered before the Ulster Branch on April 30th", British Medical Journal, 1 (3363): 1065–1069, doi:10.1136/bmj.1.3363.1065, PMC 2226787, PMID 20772078 JUSTOR link
- McCarrison, R. (23 October 1926), "A Good Diet and a Bad One: An Experimental Contrast", British Medical Journal, 2 (3433): 724–2, 730–732, doi:10.1136/bmj.2.3433.724, PMC 2523538, PMID 20772829
- McCarrison, R. (15 January 1927), "An Experiment in Goitre Prevention: Being the Further History of Goitre at the Lawrence Royal Military School, Sanawar, Punjab, India", British Medical Journal, 1 (3445): 94–95, doi:10.1136/bmj.1.3445.94, PMC 2453840
- McCarrison, R. (16 April 1927), "The Experimental Production of Stone in the Bladder", British Medical Journal, 1 (3458): 717–718, doi:10.1136/bmj.1.3458.717, PMC 2454290, PMID 20773132
- McCarrison, R. (31 May 1930), "A Goitre Survey in Albino Rats", British Medical Journal, 1 (3621): 989–992, doi:10.1136/bmj.1.3621.989, PMC 2313433, PMID 20775488
- McCarrison, R. (6 June 1931), "A Lecture on Some Surgical Aspects of Faulty Nutrition", British Medical Journal, 1 (3674): 966–971, doi:10.1136/bmj.1.3674.966, PMC 2315099, PMID 20776211
- McCarrison, R. (13 June 1931), "A Lecture on The Causation of Stone in India", British Medical Journal, 1 (3675): 1009–1015, doi:10.1136/bmj.1.3675.1009, PMC 2314725
- McCarrison, R. (14 October 1933), "A Paper on Food and Goitre", British Medical Journal, 2 (3797): 671–675, doi:10.1136/bmj.2.3797.671, PMC 2369402, PMID 20777816
- McCarrison, R. (26 September 1936), "Nutrition in Health and Disease", British Medical Journal, 2 (3951): 611–615, doi:10.1136/bmj.2.3951.611, PMC 2457588, PMID 20780124
- McCarrison, R. (2 January 1937), "The Problem of Endemic Goitre", British Medical Journal, 1 (3965): 29–31, doi:10.1136/bmj.1.3965.29, PMC 2092759, PMID 20780395
- McCarrison, R. (7 August 1937), "Nutritional Needs in Pregnancy", British Medical Journal, 2 (3996): 256–257, doi:10.1136/bmj.2.3996.256, PMC 2087076, PMID 20780822
- McCarrison, Major-General Sir Robert (15 June 1940), "Medical Aspects of the Use of Food", British Medical Journal, 1 (4145): 984–987, doi:10.1136/bmj.1.4145.984, PMC 2177719, PMID 20783158
- McCarrison, R (11 July 1942), "Social Medicine (letter to editor)", British Medical Journal, 2 (4253): 51, doi:10.1136/bmj.2.4253.51, ISSN 0007-1447, PMC 2163459
- McCarrison, Sir Robert (1947), "Introductory Remarks on Nutrition To-day", International Journal of Food Sciences and Nutrition, 1 (2): 69–72, doi:10.3109/09637484709143130
- Nutrition and Health: Being the Cantor Lectures to the Royal Society of Arts in 1936, together with two earlier Essays, London: Faber and Faber, 1953^{[d]}

== Explanatory notes ==
a. The bulk of McCarrison's work appears to have been published in the British Medical Journal (BMJ), although he did publish in other journals, such as JAMA and The Lancet, amongst others. Some publications are also found in the Proceedings of the Royal Society of Medicine. Free access to publications BMJ and the Proceedings is to be found in the external links section. Some of McCarrison's publications listed are from those journals, but links were not located at time of listing. They should however, be available at these websites, along with other publications by or about McCarrison from those two journals which have not been located or listed.

b. This letter is by the "nominal overseer" of McCarrison's last salaried post. It contains particularly insightful commentary on the contribution of McCarrison at a time of significant change in the existing university and medical institutions of the UK.

c. The author of this obituary letter on McCarrison is identified only as "N.C.P.", which are also the initials of N.C. Penrose, author of a 1951 letter defending the legacy of McCarrison's earlier works.

d. A book review of the 1953 edition is cited in this article, hence the listing. However, there have been other publications of this book both before and since. A publication from 1944 (Nutrition and National Health) is to be found via web searches comprising the same lecture and essay collection. And publications in 1961 and 1982, under Nutrition and Health, are also to be found. A new edition was produced in 2010, and may found at Lulu, a Print on Demand / Self-Publishing service.

== General and cited references ==
The following works discuss aspects of the life and work of Robert McCarrison.

- Hardy, Anne (January 1995), "Beriberi, Vitamin B1, and World Food Policy, 1925-1970", Medical History, 39 (1): 61–77, doi:10.1017/s0025727300059482, PMC 1036938, PMID 7877405
- William Lockeretz, ed. (2007), Organic Farming: An International History, Oxfordshire, UK & Cambridge, Massachusetts: CAB International (CABI), ISBN 978-0-85199-833-6 ebook ISBN 978-1-84593-289-3
- Gardner, Professor A.D (11 June 1960), "Obituary: Sir Robert McCarrison (letter)", British Medical Journal, 1 (5188): 1818–1819, doi:10.1136/bmj.1.5188.1818-b, PMC 1967774^{[b]}
- "Medical News", British Medical Journal, (Notification of pending lecture at Middlesex Hospital on Tuesday 27 June), 1 (4093): 1266, 17 June 1939, doi:10.1136/bmj.1.4093.1266, PMC 2209865
- Akhtar, Rais; Learmonth, A.T.A, eds. (1986), Geographical Aspects of Health and Disease in India, New Delhi: Concept Publishing Company
- N.C.P (4 June 1960), "Obituary: Sir Robert McCarrison (letter)", British Medical Journal, 1 (5187): 1743–1744, doi:10.1136/bmj.1.5187.1743-b, PMC 1967689. Retrieved 11 August 2010.^{[c]}
- Penrose, N.C (3 February 1951), "Health, Diet, Soil", British Medical Journal, 1( (4700): 250–251, doi:10.1136/bmj.1.4700.250-c, PMC 2068206 retrieved 11 August 2010^{[c]}
- Ramalingaswami, V (1953), "The problem of goitre prevention in India", Bulletin of the World Health Organization, 9 (2): 275–281, PMC 2542097, PMID 13094515
- Sinclair, H.M, ed. (1953), The work of Sir Robert McCarrison, London: Faber and Faber
  - Passmore, R (1953), "The work of Sir Robert McCarrison (book review)", Experimental Physiology, The Physiological Society, doi:10.1113/expphysiol.1953.sp001040
- "Ulster Medical Society", British Medical Journal, (Comment on McCarrison's visit and lecture of 30 April), 1 (3359): 944, 16 May 1925, PMC 2226736
- Vernon, James (June 2005), "The Ethics of Hunger and the Assembly of Society: The Techno-Politics of the School Meal in Modern Britain", The American Historical Review, 110 (3): 693–725, doi:10.1086/ahr.110.3.693, PMID 16189931
- Wrench, Dr Guy T (1938), The Wheel of Health: A Study of the Hunza People and the Keys to Health, 2009 reprint, Review Press, ISBN 978-0-9802976-6-9
