= Feel Good Food =

British cookery magazine

- Editor: Jane Curran
- Categories: Cookery
- Frequency: Bi-monthly
- Circulation: 55,117, (ABC Jan - Dec 2013); Print and digital editions.
- Publisher: IPC Media
- Founded: 2008
- Country: United Kingdom
- Language: English
- Website: Feel Good Food

Feel Good Food is a bi-monthly cookery magazine published by IPC Media. It is a spin-off from Woman & Home magazine and is edited by Jane Curran.

== Early history ==
The magazine launched as a quarterly magazine in 2008 after a one-off for Christmas edition in 2007. In November 2011 IPC Media decided to increase the publication to six copies a year.

== See also ==
- Feel Good You
