= L'Art culinaire =

L'Art culinaire was a biweekly gastronomical magazine for professional chefs founded in Paris in 1882 by Maurice Dancourt, who later used the pseudonym Châtillon-Plessis. Its first issue appeared as a supplement to La Petite Revue illustrée: littéraire, artistique et gastronomique in January 1883. Its editors and contributors included Philéas Gilbert, Auguste Escoffier, and other leading chefs. In the 1890s, it was edited by Châtillon-Plessis and became "the leading professional culinary journal in the world", with contributors across Europe and North America, and a claimed readership of 10,000. During the first World War, it was published irregularly, and after the war, it lost prestige and contributors, including Escoffier, Gilbert, and Prosper Montagné, to La Revue culinaire. Its last issue was in 1953.

Starting in 1894, Escoffier contributed recipes and model menus to each issue: "L'école des menus: étude et composition de menus modernes à la maison, à l'hôtel, et au restaurant".

The magazine was originally the organ of the Union Universelle pour le Progrès de l'Art Culinaire, founded earlier in 1882, and became the organ of the Société des Cuisiniers français pour le Progrès de l'Art Culinaire (nominally the Paris section of the Union) in 1883. The Union and the Société had three goals: publishing a journal to disseminate the latest ideas; establishing a professional cooking school in Paris; and promoting culinary competitions (concours culinaires). The cooking school was finally established in 1891 on rue Bonaparte, but failed in 1894. The first competition was held in December 1882, before the magazine was launched, the second in November 1883, and thereafter it was held annually in January. It inspired cooking competitions in Vienna (1884), London (1885), Brussels (1887), and New York (before 1892).

== See also ==
- La Cuisinière Cordon Bleu
- Le Pot-au-feu

== Bibliography ==
- Stephen Mennell, All Manners of Food: Eating and Taste in England and France from the Middle Ages to the Present, 1996, ISBN 0252064909, p. 169–177
