= Restaurant Insider =

American culinary magazine

- New York Restaurant Insider cover August 2006 with Tom Valenti
- Editor: Matt DeLucia
- Staff writers: Diana DeLucia
- Categories: Restaurants
- Frequency: Monthly
- First issue: May 2005
- Country: USA
- Based in: Farmington, CT
- Language: English
- Website: Restaurant Insider

Restaurant Insider is a monthly culinary magazine that conducts in-depth profiles on the restaurant industry's best known chefs and restaurateurs. The magazine began publishing in April 2005 as a trade-only magazine and has expanded to include newsstand availability, presence at food festivals, trade shows, and through online marketing.

Major profiles include:

- Daniel Boulud
- Anthony Bourdain
- Terrance Brennan
- Tom Colicchio
- Thomas Keller
- Alfred Portale
- Gordon Ramsay
- Eric Ripert
- Charlie Trotter
- Tom Valenti

== See also ==
- List of food and drink magazines
