= Food Structure =

- Discipline: Food science
- Language: English
- Edited by: Miloslav Kaláb

Publication details
- Former name: Food Microstructure
- History: 1982-1993
- Publisher: Scanning Microscopy International (USA)
- Frequency: Biannually, quarterly

Standard abbreviations
- ISO 4: Food Struct.

Indexing
- CODEN: FSTUE2
- ISSN: 1046-705X
- LCCN: 91656538
- OCLC no.: 20496653
- Food Microstructure
- ISSN: 0730-5419

Food Structure was a peer-reviewed scientific journal which specialized in electron microscopy of foods, feeds, and their ingredients in addition to other methods of structural research including all kinds of optical microscopy. It was printed on glossy paper to ensure high quality of micrographs. It is not published any more but all papers are available at no charge and without registration.

== History ==
Food Structure was established in 1982 by Scanning Electron Microscopy, Inc. (Chicago) as Food Microstructure and published biannually. The title was changed to Food Structure in 1990 and the journal was published quarterly. The editor-in-chief was Miloslav Kaláb (at the time: Agriculture and Agri-Food Canada). Reviewers' names (minimum 3 per manuscript) were revealed to the authors, who responded in a Discussion with the Reviewers, published at the end of each paper.

The journal was discontinued abruptly at the end of 1993 and the publisher (renamed Scanning Microscopy International) discontinued all operations several years later. Manuscripts already accepted for publication were published in LWT - Food Science and Technology, which had included Kaláb in their editorial board. Before he died on March 18, 2015, Om Johari declared in writing as the publisher and copyright holder his desire that everything he had published be made freely available.

D. J. McMahon has fulfilled his desire by digitizing the journal and placing all papers in PDF format on the Internet. The Tables of Contents facilitate searching.

== Contents ==
A total of 386 papers were published: 279 research papers, 76 reviews, and 31 papers on methods and tutorials. By subject, there were 79 research papers on dairy subjects, 61 on meat research, 53 on cereals, 47 on food lipids and their emulsions, and 32 papers on legumes research. A Cumulative Index for 1982-1989 with 243 entries and an extensive compilation with 882 entries, an Author Index with 876 names, and a Subject Index with 451 entries published a year later facilitated the search for literature on the structure of milk products in the pre-Internet times. The journal is referred to in Infocus. It is listed in library databases such as Ovid.

A new, unrelated journal with the same title was established by Elsevier in 2014. In his first Editorial, editor-in-chief, D. Rousseau refers to the now defunct journal and declares that, in the new Elsevier journal, the spirit and essence of Food Structure remain the same: to provide a dedicated international venue devoted to innovative food structure and functionality research.
