= Feel Good You =

British women's magazine

- Editor: Carrie Taylor
- Categories: Lifestyle
- Frequency: Monthly
- Publisher: IPC Media
- Founded: 2011
- Country: United Kingdom
- Language: English
- Website: Feel Good You

Feel Good You is a monthly magazine for women aged over 40 published by IPC Media. It is a spin-off from Woman & Home magazine and is edited by Carrie Taylor.

== History ==
The magazine was launched in 2011 following the launch of Feel Good Food.

== See also ==
- Feel Good Food
