= Draft (magazine) =

- Editor-in-chief: Erika Rietz
- Categories: Beer, New York Festival
- Frequency: Bi-monthly
- Publisher: DRAFT Publishing
- Total circulation: 270,000 (2009)
- First issue: September 2006
- Final issue: August 2017
- Country: USA
- Based in: Phoenix, Arizona
- Language: English
- Website: www.draftmag.com

DRAFT was an American magazine about beer and beer culture, published between September 2006 and August 2017 by DRAFT Publishing. Erika Rietz was the founder and editor-in-chief. The magazine was headquartered in Phoenix, Arizona.

The magazine published the 2013 edition of its “America’s 100 best beer bars” list.

It was purchased by Christopher Byron Rice in 2017. He discontinued the print edition of the magazine and turned it into an online publication.

Rice, who was also the owner of All About Beer magazine filed for chapter 7 bankruptcy and personal bankruptcy in March 2019, citing $4.5 million in debt.

== See also ==
- List of food and drink magazines
