= Sommelier India =

Indian wine magazine

- Categories: Wine magazine
- Frequency: Bi-monthly
- Total circulation: 25,000 (2021)
- Founder: Reva K. Singh & Shiv Singh
- First issue: 1 September 2004
- Company: Consolidated Media Intl.
- Country: India
- Based in: Delhi, India
- Language: English
- Website: www.sommelierindia.com

Cover of Sommelier India

Sommelier India - The Wine Magazine is an Indian wine magazine dedicated to wine and the culture surrounding wine. The magazine was founded by Reva K. Singh and Shiv Bir Singh. International and Indian wine writers contribute to Sommelier India. This includes two Master of Wine one of whom is wine writer and critic Jancis Robinson. The magazine has been in publication since September 2005. Each issue is approximately 80 pages and is written by Indian and International wine writers.

The magazine also organises Sommelier India Wine Competition (SIWC) for wines imported and domestically produced in India. The competition used to be judged by a panel of judges led by Steven Spurrier.

Sommelier India is owned by Consolidated Media Int.
