= Quarterly Review of Wines =

- Categories: Wine magazines
- Frequency: Quarterly
- Publisher: Richard L. Elia
- Founded: 1977
- Final issue: 1 November 2011
- Country: United States,
- Based in: Winchester, Massachusetts
- Language: English
- Website: www.qrw.com/

Quarterly Review of Wines, abbreviated QRW, is a U.S. quarterly publication with an emphasis on wine, food and travel. Published by Richard L. Elia, the first issue was released in 1977. QRW contributors include Michael Broadbent MW, David Peppercorn MW, Serena Sutcliffe MW. Clive Coates MW, Rosemary George MW, Ed McCarthy, Jacqueline Friedrich, Burton Anderson and Gerald D. Boyd. On 1 November 2011, the magazine discontinued its print version and went online.
