= Dark Rye =

- Website type: Online magazine
- Available in: English
- Owner: Whole Foods Market
- Website: www.darkrye.com
- Commercial: Yes
- Launched: 2012; 14 years ago

Dark Rye is a digital magazine published by Whole Foods Market, based in Austin, Texas. The publication focuses on multimedia storytelling through video, infographics, photos, recipes, DIY projects, and written content. Dark Rye highlights people from across the globe who are doing original things, especially in the areas of food, health, sustainability, design, technology and social enterprise. The site provides content intended for highlighting individual experiences.

Dark Rye was launched in 2012.

== Awards and nominations ==
In 2013, Dark Rye won a James Beard Foundation Book, Broadcast & Journalism Award for Best Group Food Blog. The online magazine was also nominated for Best Video Webcast, On Location, for its series "The Curious Adventures of Kirk Lombard".

== Other recognitions ==
=== 2013 ===
- The Webby Awards: Nominee in the Documentary, Individual Episode category for "The Unseen Bean"
- The Webby Awards: Official Honoree in the How-To & DIY category for "Brooklyn Brew Kids – How To Brew"
- Byron Bay International Film Festival: Winner, Sustainable Shorts category for "The Garden Pool"
- World Arts Film Festival: Winner, Best New Media- PSA for "Share the Buzz"
- New Media Film Festival: Official Selection in Socially Responsible Content for "The Last Supper"
- Vimeo Staff Pick for "Brooklyn Brew Kids"
- Big Sky Documentary Film Fest: Official Selection for "The Last Supper"
- Trail Dance Film Festival: Official Selection for "The Last Supper"
- Colorado Environmental Film Festival: Official Selection for "The Garden Pool"
- Phoenix Film Festival: Official Selection for "The Garden Pool"
- Lookout Wild Film Festival: Official Selection for "What the Tree Remembers, the Axe Forgets"
- Free Speech Film Festival: Free Speech Award Finalist for "The Last Supper"
- Charleston International Film Festival: Official Selection for "At This Very Moment"
- iD Fest (England): Official Selection for "At This Very Moment"

=== 2012 ===
- Healdsburg International Short Film Festival: Official Selection for "The Last Supper"
- Arizona Underground Film Festival: Official Selection for "The Last Supper"
- The Indie Fest: Award of Merit, Disability Issues category for "The Unseen Bean"
- International Film Festival of Cinematic Arts – Los Angeles: Official Selection for "The Last Supper"
- Vimeo Staff Pick for "The Last Supper"
- Vimeo Staff Pick for "The Unseen Bean"
- Action On Film International Film Festival: Runner-up, Best Short Doc for "The Last Supper"
