= Woman & Home =

Monthly lifestyle magazine for women

- Cover of May 2024 issue
- Editor: Print: Hannah Fernando; Digital: Sarah J Ross
- Categories: Women's lifestyle
- Frequency: Monthly
- Format: A4
- Circulation: 229,819 (ABC, January – December 2021) (URL); Print and digital editions.
- Founded: 1926; 100 years ago
- Company: Future plc
- Country: United Kingdom
- Based in: London
- Language: English
- Website: www.womanandhome.com
- ISSN: 0043-7247

Woman & Home is a monthly lifestyle magazine published by Future PLC. The London-based women's lifestyle brand produces fashion and beauty features for women in their 40s and older, along with articles on the home and garden, health, food, with recipes and meal plans, and travel content. The magazine also publishes monthly book reviews, author interviews, and occasional short stories.

While the magazine and website are produced largely for a British audience, both have readers around the world. An edition of Woman & Home is published in South Africa and an export edition is sold worldwide.

Woman & Home was acquired from TI Media Limited by the publishing group Future PLC in 2020 and now has writers and offices across the UK (London and Bath), and in the United States (New York and Atlanta).

== Early history ==
The magazine was launched in 1926 by Amalgamated Press.

== Subsidiary publications ==
Woman & Home has a subsidiary publication, Feel Good You, a monthly health and wellbeing magazine.

== Awards ==
The magazine was awarded the Consumer Magazine of the Year and the Consumer Media Brand of the Year by the PPA in July 2014.

== Journalistic staff ==
- Editor - Hannah Fernando
- Digital Editor-in-Chief - Sarah Joan Ross
- Fashion Director - Paula Moore
- Beauty Director - Sarah Cooper White
- Features Director - Sharon Sweeney
- Travel Editor - Helena Cartwright
- Books Editor - Zoe West
- Group Health Director - Faye M Smith
- Home Editor - Esme Clemo
- Food Editor - Jennifer Bedloe
