= Journal of Food Biochemistry =

- Discipline: Food science
- Language: English
- Edited by: Maurice R. Marshall, Benjamin Kofi Simpson, Issac Ashie

Publication details
- History: Since 1977
- Publisher: Wiley-Blackwell
- Frequency: Bimonthly
- Impact factor: 4.2 (2024)

Standard abbreviations
- ISO 4: J. Food Biochem.

Indexing
- CODEN: JFBIDW
- ISSN: 0145-8884 (print); 1745-4514 (web)
- LCCN: 77073657
- OCLC no.: 02917846

Links
- Journal homepage; Online access; Online archive

The Journal of Food Biochemistry is a peer-reviewed scientific journal that covers research on the effects of handling, storage, and processing on the biochemical aspects of food. It was established in 1977 and is published by Wiley-Blackwell. The journal moved to online-only publication in 2011.
