= Wines & Vines =

American wine industry trade magazine (1919-2018)

Wines & Vines (W&V) was a wine industry magazine published from 1919 to 2018 in San Rafael, California.

== History ==
Wines & Vines was founded in 1919.

In June 2006, Jim Gordon became the editor of the magazine. In January 2013, Wines & Vines merged with the quarterly journal Practical Winery & Vineyard, also based in San Rafael, California. The content of the latter became a special section of Wines & Vines. Both were already owned by Wine Communications Group of Sonoma. In July 2013, Wines & Vines launched an editorial partnership with the East Coast wine magazine Wine East.

In January 2019, the Wine Communication Group merged the magazine under the Wine Business Monthly brand, turning off the switch on Wines & Vines. Its last issue was published in December 2018. The resources of the magazine were reinvested into the development of the Wine Analytics Report.

== Description ==
Wines & Vines focuses on winemaking, grapegrowing and wine marketing in North America. The magazine also publishes an annual directory and buyer's guide, cataloging current contact and technical information for US wineries, growers, distributors, trade associations, retailers, and writers. The magazine catered to a professional audience of industry insiders.

As of 2013, circulation was 8,300. Over 50% of their subscribers were on the West Coast. Wines & Vines also used to deliver the yearly Perpetual Trophy for Excellence in Wine Writing, and make a yearly list of the 50 Most influential people in the US Wine Industry.
