= Canadian Wine Annual =

The Canadian Wine Annual was the yearly guide to Canadian wineries from Wine Access magazine - a magazine about wine and food. The magazine was founded in 2006. The Annual was published every spring and included a complete listing of Canadian wineries, as well as maps, accommodations and other travel information. Articles in the Annual examined, among other things, the Canadian wine industry and the enotourism industry.

The 2007 Annual included information on more than 300 wineries, divided into 5 regions: Ontario; British Columbia; Quebec; Atlantic; and the Prairies.

Results from the Canadian Wine Awards (this competition, a property of Wine Access, is held annually in late summer and results are originally printed in the December/January issue of the magazine) are printed in the Annual, including the Performance Report of the Top 20 Canadian Wineries of the year.

The Annual ceased publication with the February / March 2013 issue.
