= International Journal of Food Sciences and Nutrition =

- Discipline: Food sciences, nutrition
- Language: English
- Edited by: Furio Brighenti

Publication details
- History: 1947-present
- Publisher: Informa
- Frequency: 8/year
- Impact factor: 3.483 (2019)

Standard abbreviations
- ISO 4: Int. J. Food Sci. Nutr.

Indexing
- CODEN: IJFNEH
- ISSN: 0963-7486 (print); 1465-3478 (web)
- LCCN: sn92038360
- OCLC no.: 39035507

Links
- Journal homepage; Online access; Online archive

The International Journal of Food Sciences and Nutrition is a peer-reviewed scientific journal that covers food science and nutrition. It is published by Taylor & Francis.

As of 2019, the editor-in-chief is Daniele Del Rio (University of Parma).

== Abstracting and indexing ==
The journal is abstracted and indexed in BIOSIS Previews, Chemical Abstracts, Current Contents/Agriculture, Biology & Environmental Sciences, EMBASE/Excerpta Medica, Food Science & Technology Abstracts, Index Medicus/MEDLINE/PubMed, PASCAL, Scopus, and Science Citation Index Expanded.

== Impact factor ==
According to the Journal Citation Reports, the journal has a 2019 impact factor of 3.483.

== See also ==
- The American Journal of Clinical Nutrition
- Food Science and Technology International
- Critical Reviews in Food Science and Nutrition
