= La bonne cuisine de Madame E. Saint-Ange =

1927 French bourgeois cuisine cookbook

- Author: Marie Ébrard (writing as E. Saint-Ange)
- Language: French
- Subject: Culinary Arts
- Genre: non-fiction
- Publisher: Éditions Larousse
- Publication date: 1927
- Publication place: France
- Media type: book

La bonne cuisine de Madame E. Saint-Ange is a French cookbook written by Marie Ébrard under the name E. Saint-Ange and published in 1927 by Larousse. A "classic text of French home cooking", it is a highly detailed work documenting the cuisine bourgeoise of early 20th century France, including technical descriptions of the kitchen equipment of the day.

Before writing La bonne cuisine, Ébrard had written a cooking column in her husband's magazine Le Pot au Feu for twenty years, and much of the content is drawn from the magazine. The book was originally published as Le livre de cuisine de Madame Saint-Ange: recettes et méthodes de la bonne cuisine française; the current title was drawn from a later abridgement, and was retroactively applied to a modest updating of the original work by the publisher in the 1950s. Other editions use the title La cuisine de Madame Saint-Ange.

Many American chefs and cooking teachers working in French cuisine have cited it as a significant influence, including Madeleine Kamman, Julia Child, and the co-founder of Chez Panisse, Paul Aratow, who translated it into English. Though the book reflects the equipment and the tastes of the 1920s, reviewers have found it useful for cooking today:

Its recipes work; the dishes they produce are delicious; the extensive advice is empowering. ...this is a book that cries out to be cooked with.

In 1960 Elizabeth David wrote of the book:

In my experience, this is to date far and away the most practical cookery book in the French language. It is a book of recipes of the very best and most carefully prepared kind of French household dishes. As such, it is directed at housewives rather than professionals but, in its impeccable precision of detail (six pages, for example, devoted to the proper method of beating egg whites) is much more valuable even than such classics as Escoffier's Guide culinaire or Gilbert’s Cuisine de tous les mois.

== Sources ==
- David, Elizabeth (1964) [1960]. French Provincial Cooking. London: Penguin. OCLC 27037523.
