= American Winery Guide =

Online compendium of wineries in the United States

- Type: Winery compendium
- Format: Online
- Owner(s): Jim Finley, Tim Donahoe
- Staff writers: 25
- Founded: 2007
- Headquarters: 211 North Union Street, Suite 100; Alexandria, VA 22314-2643
- Website: www.americanwineryguide.com

American Winery Guide (AWG) is an online compendium of wineries in the United States. Founded by Jim Finley and Tim Donahoe in 2007, American Winery Guide catalogues and maps American wineries by state and viticultural area. The guide lists the address, owner, winemaker, founding date, hours of operation, tasting fees, and production statistics for over 7,500 wineries. Additionally, American Winery Guide employs correspondents who write articles about wineries in an area. In 2013, American Winery Guide partnered with CellarPass and VinoVisit, two winery reservation services, to allow customers to search for wineries on American Winery Guide's website, and then book a wine tasting or winery tour using the reservation companies.
