= Journal of Food Safety =

- Discipline: Food science
- Language: English
- Edited by: Vivian C.H. Wu

Publication details
- History: 1977-present
- Publisher: Wiley-Blackwell
- Frequency: Quarterly
- Impact factor: 2.449 (2021)

Standard abbreviations
- ISO 4: J. Food Saf.

Indexing
- CODEN: JFSADP
- ISSN: 0149-6085 (print); 1745-4565 (web)
- LCCN: 78645071
- OCLC no.: 03531563

Links
- Journal homepage; Online access; Online archive

The Journal of Food Safety is a quarterly peer-reviewed scientific journal covering research on microbial food safety. It was established in 1977 and is currently published by Wiley-Blackwell. The journal moved to online-only publication in 2011. The editor-in-chief is Vivian C.H. Wu (USDA ARS).
