= Brijesh Tiwari =

Indian food scientist in Ireland

- Born: Brijesh Kumar Tiwari
- Scientific career
- Fields: Food technology
- Workplaces: University College Dublin

Professor Brijesh Kumar Tiwari is an academic and researcher currently serving as a principal research officer at the Agriculture and Food Development Authority (Teagasc) of Ireland. He is an adjunct professor at the University College Dublin. As of August 2024, he had 33531 citations with h-index 98.

== Academic career ==
Tiwari studied at the Central Food Technological Research Institute in India and obtained a master's degree. He obtained a PhD from the University College Dublin in 2009.

Tiwari's research output includes over 200 peer-reviewed research publications and over 100 book chapters. He has also co-edited 14 books and is a book series editor for IFST Advances in Food Science book series. Prior to his doctoral studies, Tiwari worked as a Research Scientist at the Indian Institute of Crop Processing Technology. During his PhD, he secured a Lecturer position at University College Dublin and later transitioned to a full-time faculty role at Manchester Metropolitan University (MMU) in 2010. In 2011, he was promoted to Senior Lecturer at MMU. Currently, he leads a research team comprising six postdoctoral researchers and research officers, along with ten PhD students, focusing on novel food processing technologies.

== Awards and honours ==
1. Serving as Editor in Chief Journal of Food Processing and Preservation.
2. Fellow of Institute of Food Science & Technology.
3. Fellow of Royal Society of Chemistry.

== Books ==
1. Chemistry of Thermal and Non-Thermal Food Processing Technologies 1st Edition – 1 November 2024
2. Seaweed Sustainability(1st Edition) Food and Non-Food Applications by Brijesh K. Tiwari, Declan Troy Hardcover, 472 Pages, Published 2015 by Academic Press ISBN 978-0-12-418697-2, ISBN 0-12-418697-1

== Selected publications ==
1. Ummat, Viruja, Saravana Periaswamy Sivagnanam, Dilip K. Rai, Colm O'Donnell, Gillian E. Conway, Shane M. Heffernan, Stephen Fitzpatrick, Henry Lyons, James Curtin, and Brijesh Kumar Tiwari. "Conventional extraction of fucoidan from Irish brown seaweed Fucus vesiculosus followed by ultrasound-assisted depolymerization." Scientific Reports 14, no. 1 (2024): 6214.
2. Soro, Arturo B., Daniel Ekhlas, Sajad Shokri, Ming Ming Yem, Rui Chao Li, Soukaina Barroug, Shay Hannon et al. "The efficiency of UV light-emitting diodes (UV-LED) in decontaminating Campylobacter and Salmonella and natural microbiota in chicken breast, compared to a UV pilot-plant scale device." Food Microbiology 116 (2023): 104365.
