= The In Out =

American indie rock band from Boston, Massachusetts

- Origin: Boston, Massachusetts
- Years active: 1992–2012, 2021-present
- Members: Todd Nudelman, Boris Yazlovitsky, James Poolner
- Past members: David Pierce Miki Dennison; Matt Hunter; Jeff Downs; Jessica (Rodden) Anderson; Keri Lynn Dyrdahl; Andy Abrahamson; Leo Green; Nick Blakey; Greg Kay; Jim "ning nong" Siegel; Eric Boomhower; Tim Morse; Jim Seery; Chris Keene; Rich Adkins Dan Gonzales

The In Out is a Boston-area garage rock band primarily active from 1992 through 2012. Heavily influenced by The Fall, Link Wray, and Spherical Objects (among others), Pitchfork described their sound as "classically lo-fi, with vocals that could have been taped from a payphone."

The band was formed in Allston, Massachusetts, by Todd Nudelman and David Pierce in 1992. They released their first single on their own Viscera-Versa label in 1994 and it went to #1 on Harvard (WHRB-FM) and MIT (WMMS-FM) college stations in 1995. The band toured the US and Europe, touring with The Slaves (1998), Sebadoh (1999), The Mondo Crescendo (1999), Bobby Conn (2000), and the Guinea Worms (2011). Over their 20-year existence, the group opened for numerous local, national, and international acts including !!!, Arab On Radar, Ari Up, Bon Savants, The Cannanes, The Chinese Stars, Cibo Matto, Come, Cotton Candy, The Country Teasers, The Dirty Three, Eugene S. Robinson, The Frogs, Frustrations, Japanther, Kilslug, Mission of Burma, Neptune, Nightingales, Pop. 1280, Psycho, Skeleton Key, Six Finger Satellite, Spindrift, Super Furry Animals, Thee OhSees, and Thomas Function.

Nudelman - the group's one consistent member throughout their existence - says the band is "All about self-expression.... It's in there and it's gotta come out." The Boston Globe called the band "one of the finer European art-punk bands to ever come out of Boston."

In 2022 The In Out released an album, Half-VaXXed, on vinyl and as a digital download. In 2026 The In Out played a live show with Nudelman, Poolner and Yazlovitsky at Gary Panter's record store Feeding Tube Records.

== Discography ==
- Levitt House Gone Wrong (Single, 1994/Viscera-Versa)
- Hatched And Scrambled!! (EP, 1995/Viscera-Vera)
- Lawn Trousers (Single 1996/Viscera-Versa)
- Cosm0sis (LP, 1997/Viscera-Versa - Oblivion - Dark Beloved Cloud)
- The Viscera-Versa Story (CD, 1998/LoveLetter)
- "Keri's New Drone" on Dreams Are Free (With Purchase) (Sympathy For Count Pococurante, Vol. 3) (CD, 1998/Dark Beloved Cloud)
- A Living Memorial in Deutschland (CD, 2000/Dark Beloved Cloud)
- Il Dito and Other Gestures (CD, 2003/Emperor Jones)
- The Venal Column (LP, 2011/Sell You Records)
- Agenda + 2 (EP, 2012/Sell You Records)
- "Stupidity" (Split single with the Guinea Worms, 2012/Sell You Records - Botulism)
