= Goodtoknow Recipes =

UK cooking magazine

goodtoknow Recipes
- Editor: Matt Davis
- Categories: Recipes
- Frequency: Monthly
- Circulation: 29,408 (ABC Jul – Dec 2013); Print and digital editions
- Publisher: Time Inc. UK
- First issue: February 2010
- Country: United Kingdom
- Language: English
- Website: goodtoknow Recipes

goodtoknow Recipes is a monthly cooking magazine published by Time Inc. UK. It is edited by Matt Davis.

== Early history ==
The magazine was launched in February 2010 following the success a website of the same name.
