= Journal of Food Processing and Preservation =

- Discipline: Food science
- Language: English
- Edited by: Charles Brennan, Brijesh K. Tiwari

Publication details
- History: 1977–present
- Publisher: Wiley-Blackwell
- Frequency: Bimonthly
- Impact factor: 1.288 (2018)

Standard abbreviations
- ISO 4: J. Food Process. Preserv.

Indexing
- CODEN: JFPPDL
- ISSN: 0145-8892 (print); 1745-4549 (web)
- LCCN: 77643076
- OCLC no.: 03082583

Links
- Journal homepage; Online access; Online archive

The Journal of Food Processing and Preservation is a peer-reviewed scientific journal that covers research into food processing and preservation. It is published by Wiley-Blackwell. The journal moved to online-only publication in 2011.
