= Cherry Bombe =

American wine magazine

- Categories: Wine magazine
- Founded: 2013
- Language: English

Cherry Bombe is an American magazine and media company that focuses on women working in the food and beverage industry. Based in Brooklyn, New York, Cherry Bombe produces a print magazine, podcast, cookbook, and hosts national events.

== History ==
Cherry Bombe was established as a print magazine in 2013 by Claudia Wu and Kerry Diamond. The magazine was originally funded through a Kickstarter campaign that raised more than 42,000 dollars. The first issue was published in May 2013, featuring Karlie Kloss as its cover model. Each issue of the magazine sold around 10,000 copies in 2014.

In 2014, Cherry Bombe expanded its scope by establishing Jubilee, an annual conference focusing on women in the culinary world. In May 2014, Cherry Bombe started Radio Cherry Bombe, a weekly podcast on the Heritage Radio Network, with host and writer Julia Turshen. Later on, Kerry Diamond took over as host of the show. Cherry Bombe released a cookbook in 2017 featuring recipes from female chefs, cooks, writers and bakers.
