= Gordon Norton Ray =

American English professor

Gordon Norton Ray (8 September 1915, New York City – 15 December 1986, Manhattan) was an American author, professor of English, and collector of English and French illustrated books and autographed letters from the Victorian era.

== Biography ==
Ray graduated from New Trier High School in Winnetka in 1932, Indiana University with A.B. and A.M. in 1936, and graduated and from Harvard University with A.M. in 1938 and Ph.D. in 1940. His doctoral thesis on Thackeray has the title Thackeray in France. Ray was an instructor in English at Harvard University from 1940 to 1942 and then in 1942 enlisted in the U.S. Navy as an apprentice seaman. He saw combat on aircraft carriers in the Pacific and was promoted to lieutenant with seven battle stars.

Ray wrote of his WW II service:

In 1943 and 1944 I was a radar and fighter director officer aboard the U.S.S. Belleau Wood, an aircraft carrier operating out of Pearl Harbor. Our routine at sea consisted of long periods of uneasy waiting, punctuated by short bursts of intense combat activity. The great day-to-day problem was somehow to conquer boredom. I had a friend at the University of Hawaii who between cruises undertook, no doubt quite illegally, to fill my footlocker with books from the university library. Under these circumstances, I read nearly half of Trollope's novels, exchanging old volumes for new each time we returned to port.

At the University of Illinois, he was a professor of English from 1946 to 1957, also serving as head of the English department, and vice president and provost from 1957 to 1960. He was a Guggenheim Fellow for the academic years 1941–1942, 1942–1943, 1945–1946, and 1956–1957. He was from 1960 to 1963 the associate secretary general and from 1963 to 1985 the president of the John Simon Guggenheim Memorial Foundation. He became a member of the American Academy of Arts and Sciences in 1962 and the American Philosophical Society in 1977.

Ray was a professor of English at New York University from 1962 to 1980, when he retired as professor emeritus.

In 1945 and 1946 Harvard University Press published his 4-volume work The Letters and Private Papers of William Makepeace Thackeray. Thackeray's heirs released to Ray additional materials (previously unavailable), enabling him to publish two more biographies, Thackeray: The Uses of Adversity, 1811-1846 (1955) and Thackeray: The Age of Wisdom, 1847-1863 (1957).

In 1954, the University of Illinois bought the complete literary archives of H. G. Wells from the author's estate to allow Dr. Ray to write extensively on Wells, who had died in 1946. The estate amounted to thousands of books, typescripts, corrected proofs and other materials, including 10,000 letters. Dr. Ray distilled some of it into Henry James and H. G. Wells (1958, with Leon Edel), and H. G. Wells and Rebecca West (1974), a much discussed selection of Wells's letters to his young mistress with substantial commentary by Dr. Ray.

At Manhattan's Pierpont Morgan Library, Ray's private collections were the main source for two exhibitions: The Illustrator and the Book in England, 1790-1914 (exhibited in 1976) and The Art of the French Illustrated Book, 1700 to 1914 (exhibited in 1982). At the Low Memorial Library on the Columbia campus, his collections formed one of the main sources of a Benjamin Disraeli exhibition in 1981.

Upon his death, he had no immediate surviving family members.
