= Buffé =

Swedish customer magazine

- Categories: Customer magazine
- Frequency: Monthly
- Publisher: OTW Media Group
- Founded: 1995
- Company: ICA
- Country: Sweden
- Based in: Stockholm
- Language: Swedish
- Website: Buffé

Buffé is a Swedish monthly free customer magazine distributed to ICA supermarket customers. The company also owned Icakuriren, a weekly family magazine, until October 2014.

== History and profile ==
Buffé was launched in 1995. It is published by OTW Media Group, a subsidiary of ICA, and is based in Stockholm. The magazine features recipes and practical information about cooking.

In 2007, Buffé had a circulation of 1,996,900 copies, making it the best-selling magazine in Sweden. By 2014, circulation had risen to 2,310,300 copies.

In 2013, Buffés publisher received the Swedish Design Awards for Magazine Design. In May 2015, the magazine earned two silver awards at Guldbladet, an award gala for the content market agencies.
