= All About Beer =

US magazine

- Categories: Food and drink magazine
- Frequency: Bi-monthly
- Publisher: Daniel Bradford
- Total circulation: 46,000 (2012)
- Founded: 1979
- Final issue Number: March 2018; 39
- Company: Chautauqua, Inc.
- Country: USA
- Based in: Durham, North Carolina
- Language: English
- Website: www.allaboutbeer.com
- ISSN: 0277-5743

All About Beer was an English-language magazine published by All About Beer, LLC. Under previous owner Chris Rice, it filed for bankruptcy in 2019. It was located in Durham, NC, USA and was published six times per year, plus one special annual issue. At its peak it had a distribution of over 46,000, with subscribers and newsstand sales in more than 40 countries.

All About Beer was the oldest American publication for beer consumers. It was written for the beer drinker, particularly those interested in new developments in craft beer and specialty brewing.

== History ==
All About Beer was founded in Los Angeles in 1979 by printing executive Mike Bosak and six colleagues from the print and publishing world. The first issue appeared in March of that year. None of the original founders was a beer expert.

In 1982, ownership of All About Beer passed to McMullen Publishing of Anaheim, CA, though Bosak and fellow founders Kenneth Yee and Terry Bratcher remained involved. By its third volume, the publication had adopted a conventional four-color magazine format. In 1988, Mike Bosak and his wife Bunny re-acquired the magazine.

When Bosak retired in 1992, he sold All About Beer to Daniel Bradford, one of the founders and the first general director of the Great American Beer Festival in Denver, and an occasional contributor to the magazine.

Bradford moved the magazine to Durham, NC. Julie Johnson served as an editor from 2000 to 2011, with Bradford as publisher.

In 1995, All About Beer magazine entered into an agreement with the Beverage Testing Institute (BTI, later Tastings.com) of Chicago to publish the results of the institute’s regular sampling of beers, grouped by style family. Each issue of All About Beer publishes a survey article on the most recent tasting results, a guide to what readers should expect from each style, and tasting notes on various beers. That relationship ended in 2015 when the magazine began doing in-house beer reviews, headed by beer editor Ken Weaver and blind tasting panels across the country.

John Holl was named editor of the magazine in 2013 and Jon Page was installed as managing editor. The magazine was sold to Rice in 2014 who gave himself the titles of president, publisher and CEO. Shortly thereafter, he began to bounce employee paychecks and was delinquent on paying vendors, contributors, and consultants.

Both Holl and Page left the magazine in 2017. Daniel Hartis was installed as editor and worked in the position until October 2018, when Rice laid off any remaining staff. A bankruptcy filing showed that Rice had put the once profitable company into $4.5 million of debt.

In 2017, All About Beer LLC acquired competing beer publication Draft magazine and quickly discontinued its print form. The bankruptcy filings show that Christopher Byron Rice still owed the previous owners of Draft a substantial amount of money from the purchase.

In 2022, it was announced that John Holl and Andy Crouch have acquired the All About Beer brand, digital assets, and editorial archive.

== On-line Presence ==
All About Beer’s companion website, allaboutbeer.com, was launched in 1997. The sites contains regular beer news, two blogs, on-line-only beer reviews, and an archive of over 5,000 magazine articles and posts dating back to 2002.

== Notable Writers ==
English beer authority Michael Jackson (writer) began writing for All About Beer in 1984, and contributed “Jackson’s Journal” to the magazine for 23 years, until his death in 2007. This was Jackson’s longest regular association with any publication.

Fred Eckhardt first wrote for the magazine in 1986, and began his regular column, “The Beer Enthusiast,” the following year.

Regular contributors included Jeff Alworth, John Holl, Tom Acitelli, Garrett Oliver, Brian Yaeger, Joe Stange, Evan Rail, Heather Vandenengel, Lew Bryson, Jeff Evans, Charlie Papazian, Adrian Tierney-Jones, Dan Rabin, Rick Lyke and Roger Protz.

== Festivals and Community Activities ==
Beginning in 1995, All About Beer has a hosted World Beer Festival in Durham, North Carolina, as well as similar festivals in North Carolina, in 2006, in Columbia, South Carolina in 2009, Richmond, VA, in 2010, and in Cleveland and Tampa. Each festival is hosted as a fundraiser for a local non-profit organization. Rice sold the festival side of the business in 2018 to manage debts.

In 2009, All About Beer Magazine partnered with Pints for Prostates to establish the annual Denver Rare Beer Tasting, a limited-ticket tasting fund-raiser at which American craft brewers are invited to present hard-to-find beers. That relationship was ended while Rice was publisher of All About Beer, but the publication is once again the event's media sponsor with Holl and Crouch in place.

All About Beer Magazine was voted best beer publication four years running by Ale and Lager Examiner. All About Beer Magazine feature articles won the Michael Jackson Award for Beer Journalism from Brewers Association four out of the five years the awards existed, and earned more than 30 Quill and Tankard Awards for writing from the North American Guild of Beer Writers.

Between 2013 - 2018, the magazine won 12 national writing awards and one international award for its beer coverage.

The World Beer Festival was ranked in top 10 American beer festivals of USA Today, and the festival was given as one of four reasons by Wired Magazine to move to Raleigh, NC.

== Publication information ==
The early years of the magazine were not always published regularly. Volume 1 comprised eight issues (1.1-1.8); Volume 2 had only five. Volume 3 comprised six issues, but the final broadsheet issue and the first issue in magazine form were both labeled 3.4. Volume 4 consisted of seven issues, before the magazine settled down to six issues per year in volumes 5 through 7. Volume 8 dropped again to five issues, and Volume 9 to four before the publication returned to the six regular issues per year that have been printed since then. The final printed issue was Volume 39, Issue 1 which was released in March 2018.
