= Journal of Food Process Engineering =

- Discipline: Food science
- Language: English
- Edited by: V.M. Balasubramaniam, The Ohio State University

Publication details
- History: 1977-present
- Publisher: Wiley-Blackwell
- Frequency: Bimonthly
- Open access: Hybrid open access
- Impact factor: 3.0 (2022)

Standard abbreviations
- ISO 4: J. Food Process Eng.

Indexing
- CODEN: JFPEDM
- ISSN: 0145-8876 (print); 1745-4530 (web)
- LCCN: 77641495
- OCLC no.: 02924831

Links
- Journal homepage; Online access; Online archive

The Journal of Food Process Engineering is a peer-reviewed scientific journal that covers research on applications of engineering to food and food processing. It was established in 1977 and is published by Wiley-Blackwell. The journal moved to online-only publication in 2011. According to the Journal Citation Reports, the journal has a 2022 impact factor of 3.0.
