= Claudia Wu =

Founder and creative director of Cherry Bombe magazine

Claudia Wu is a founder and former creative director of Cherry Bombe, a twice-yearly magazine about women and food.

== Early life ==
Wu grew up in Briarcliff Manor, New York, with Taiwanese immigrant parents.

She has a degree from the Rhode Island School of Design.

== Career ==
Wu began her career for the magazines Visionaire and V, then worked at Harper's Bazaar where she met her future Cherry Bombe partner, Kerry Diamond. Wu founded her own design firm called Orphan where she worked with Hugo Boss, NARS, Clinique, Harry Winston, and Intermix, among others. She founded Me magazine, a publication dedicated to and guest-edited by a different star for every issue.

In 2013, Wu and Kerry Diamond founded the food-fashion magazine Cherry Bombe. The initial issue was funded through Kickstarter. In 2014, they started the Cherry Bombe Jubilee conference which celebrates women in the culinary world.
