= Cocina (magazine) =

Culinary magazine in Colombia

- Editor-in-Chief: Mauricio Sojo Vásquez
- Categories: Food and drink
- Frequency: Monthly
- First issue: 3 March 2010
- Company: Publicaciones Semana S.A.
- Country: Colombia
- Based in: Bogotá, D.C.
- Language: Spanish
- Website: www.cocinasemana.com
- ISSN: 2145-6011

Cocina (Spanish: Cuisine and/or Kitchen) is a Colombian-based monthly magazine published by Publicaciones Semana S.A. It features recipes, cooking tips, culinary tourism information, restaurant reviews, chefs, wine pairings and seasonal/holiday content going beyond the typical and traditional Colombian cuisine while still paying homage to them in certain issues.
