= Le Pot-au-feu =

Le Pot-au-feu (1912), front cover

Le Pot-au-feu: Journal de cuisine pratique et d'économie domestique, later called Le pot-au-feu et les Bonnes recettes réunis (1929-1956), was a biweekly cooking magazine in quarto format published in Paris from 1893 to 1956, and addressed primarily to bourgeois housewives. Its publisher was Saint-Ange Ébrard.

In the early years, each issue began with a cooking lesson written by a professional chef. It might also include recipes, menus, and short articles. Ébrard's wife Marie also wrote a column under the name "La Vieille Catherine".

Many of the recipes published in Le Pot-au-feu were collected into Marie Ébrard's book La bonne cuisine de Madame E. Saint-Ange.

== 1877 magazine ==
There was also a magazine called Le Pot-au-feu, later renamed Journal pittoresque de gastronomie et d'économie domestique, which may or may not be related.

== See also ==
- L'Art culinaire
- La Cuisinière Cordon Bleu
