= Food Science and Technology International =

- Discipline: Food Science
- Language: English
- Edited by: Antonio Martínez López

Publication details
- Former name: Former titles (until 1995): Revista Espanola de Ciencia y Tecnologia de Alimentos (Spain) (1131-799X)/(until 1992): Revista de Agroquimica y Tecnologia de Alimentos (Spain) (0034-7698)
- History: 1995-present
- Publisher: SAGE Publications
- Frequency: Bi-monthly
- Impact factor: 1.221 (2018)

Standard abbreviations
- ISO 4: Food Sci. Technol. Int.

Indexing
- CODEN: FSTIFZ
- ISSN: 1082-0132 (print); 1532-1738 (web)
- LCCN: 96656061
- OCLC no.: 488157588

Links
- Journal homepage; Online access; Online archive

Food Science and Technology International is a bi-monthly peer-reviewed academic journal that publishes scholarly articles in the field of food science. The journal was established in 1995, and is currently published by SAGE Publications in association with the Spanish Council for Scientific Research (CSIC).

== Scope ==
The journal publishes articles covering: food processing, nutritional quality, engineering composition, biotechnology, quality, safety, physical properties, microstructure, microbiology, sensory analysis, packaging, bioprocessing and postharvest technology.

== Abstracting and indexing ==
Food Science and Technology International is abstracted and indexed in Scopus, and the Science Citation Index Expanded. According to the Journal Citation Reports, its 2022 impact factor is 2.5.
