= In Out =

British magazine

INOUT Magazine
- Editor: Victoria Melia
- Staff writers: John Wallace
- Categories: Lifestyle; food and drink
- Frequency: Quarterly
- Circulation: 30,000 (Readership estimated at 120,000)
- First issue: November 2004
- Company: Jazz Fashion Publishing Ltd.
- Country: United Kingdom
- Language: English
- Website: www.inoutmagazine.co.uk

IN|OUT Magazine is a quarterly food, drink and lifestyle magazine published by Jazz Fashion Publishing Ltd. in Chester. It is a guide for staying in or going out in North West England and North Wales, with a particular focus on food and drink, and is distributed for free through restaurants, hotels, farm shops, spas and other establishments.

== History ==
The magazine was founded in November 2004 by Giles Cooper as an independently-published guide to restaurants and attractions in Chester and was first published by UK IO Publishing Ltd in Chester. In May 2005, an edition covering the Manchester region was also published alongside the one covering Chester, and in November 2006, a Liverpool edition was published. These three titles were published separately each May and November until May 2009, when it was decided to merge the three titles into a single directory for the North West and North Wales.

In March 2014 INOUT was sold to Jazz Fashion Publishing Ltd.

== Content ==
INOUT is divided into two general sections: Staying In and Going Out:

- The In section includes: In News, Home Cooking (recipes), Local Produce and Interiors.
- The Out section includes: Out News, Eating Out (a restaurant guide for Chester, Liverpool, Manchester and North Wales), Venues & Hotels, Health, Beauty & Style and Leisure, Arts & Culture.
- There is also an Events Guide covering the three months of each issue and a listings directory. Regular features include columns by industry experts, cookbook reviews, and articles on food trends and food history.

== Awards ==
INOUT Magazine works closely with regional Tourist Boards. In 2008, INOUT sponsored the Visit Chester and Cheshire Tourism Awards, and in 2010, sponsored the Best Self Catering Establishment of the Year division of the Anglesey Tourism Awards.

In 2007, INOUT Magazine was awarded the Weber Shandwick Award for Raising the Image of the Food and Drink Industry at the Food Northwest Awards.

== Online Presence ==
INOUT launched a website to complement the magazine in 2006, and INOUT's new, improved website is launching in summer 2014.

The magazine has an active presence on Facebook, Twitter and YouTube.
