= LWT (journal) =

- Discipline: Food science, food technology
- Language: English
- Edited by: Rakesh K. Singh

Publication details
- Former names: Lebensmittel-Wissenschaft & Technologie
- History: 1968–present
- Publisher: Elsevier on behalf of the Swiss Society of Food Science and Technology and the International Union of Food Science and Technology
- Frequency: 10/year
- Impact factor: 6.6 (2024)

Standard abbreviations
- ISO 4: LWT

Indexing
- CODEN: LBWTAP
- ISSN: 0023-6438 (print); 1096-1127 (web)
- LCCN: 72625017
- OCLC no.: 858312025

Links
- Journal homepage; Online archive

LWT - Food Science and Technology, formerly known as Lebensmittel-Wissenschaft & Technologie (English: Food Science & Technology), is a peer-reviewed scientific journal published by Elsevier. It is the official journal of the Swiss Society of Food Science and Technology and the International Union of Food Science and Technology. The editor-in-chief is Rakesh K. Singh. According to the Journal Citation Reports, the journal's 2024 impact factor was 6.6.

In January 2022 LWT became an open access journal.
