= La Cuisinière Cordon Bleu =

La cuisinière Cordon Bleu, also spelled as La cuisinière cordon-bleu, was a culinary magazine started in the late 1890s by French journalist Marthe Distel (1871—1934). The magazine offered recipes and tips on entertaining. To prompt readership, the magazine offered cooking classes to subscribers. The first one was held in the kitchens of the Palais Royal in January 1895. The classes evolved in a more formal cooking school, Le Cordon Bleu. The magazine closed in 1960s, but school continues to thrive, with more than 27 schools in 17 countries as of early 2008.

== See also ==
- L'Art culinaire
- Le Pot-au-feu
