= Advanced Highway Maintenance Construction Technology Research Laboratory =

US research institute

Coordinates: 38.534075°N 121.793674°W

The Advanced Highway Maintenance Construction Technology Research Center (AHMCT) is a research institute at the University of California, Davis. They perform transportation-related research in highway maintenance, transportation infrastructure, structures, and roadways. They are funded through public and private research grants.
