= List of strikes in Mexico =

List of strikes in Mexican history

Throughout Mexican history, a number of strikes, labour disputes, student strikes, hunger strikes, and other industrial actions have occurred.

A labour strike is a work stoppage caused by the mass refusal of employees to work. This can include wildcat strikes, which are done without union authorisation, and slowdown strikes, where workers reduce their productivity while still carrying out minimal working duties. It is usually a response to employee grievances, such as low pay or poor working conditions. Strikes can also occur to demonstrate solidarity with workers in other workplaces or pressure governments to change policies.

== 18th century ==
- Real del Monte 1766 strike

== 20th century ==
=== 1900s ===
- Cananea strike
- Río Blanco strike

=== 1910s ===
- Mexican Revolution

=== 1920s ===
- 1926–27 Mexican rail strike
- 1929 UNAM strike, es.

=== 1930s ===
- 1936 Mexican rail strike
- 1937 Mexican oil workers' strike, leading to the Mexican oil expropriation.

=== 1950s ===
- 1950 Mexico taxi strike
- 1958–59 Mexican railroad strike

=== 1960s ===
- 1964–65 Mexican Medical Movement
- Mexican Movement of 1968

=== 1970s ===
- 1974 Lecumberri Prison hunger strike, hunger strike by American and Canadian inmates held at the Lecumberri Prison on charges of drug smuggling.
- 1977 UNAM strike
- 1978 Mexican air traffic controllers' strike

=== 1980s ===
- 1987 UNAM strike, 18-day strike by students at the National Autonomous University of Mexico.
- 1987 Ford Mexico strike, 40-day strike by Ford Motor Company workers in Hermosillo, Mexico.

=== 1990s ===
- 1990 Corona strike, 7-week strike by Corona brewery workers in Mexico.
- 1999 UNAM strike

== 21st century ==
=== 2000s ===
- 2000 Volkswagen Mexico strike
- 2001 Volkswagen Mexico strike
- 2003 Cananea strike, 16-day strike by miners at the Grupo México-owned Cananea Mine.
- 2005 Dubbing strike
- 2006 Oaxaca protests

=== 2010s ===
- 2015–16 Lexmark strike, by Lexmark workers in Ciudad Juárez.
- 2018 UNAM protests
- Matamoros strike

=== 2020s ===
- 2020 Mexican protests
- 2023 Mexico federal court strike;
- 2024 Audi Mexico strike.
- 2024 ArcelorMittal strike in Mexico, 55-day strike by ArcelorMittal steelworkers in Lázaro Cárdenas, Michoacán.
- 2024 Mexican judicial reform protests, including strikes by judicial workers in protest against the 2024 Mexican judicial reform.

== See also ==
- Mexican labor law
