= Nacional Monte de Piedad =

Mexican nonprofit institution and pawnshop

- Type: Private
- Industry: Pawnshop
- Founded: 1774
- Headquarters: Mexico City
- Revenue: 9,070,874,318.42 peso (2020)
- Total assets: 32,310,157,511 peso (2020)
- Number of employees: 4,535 (2020)
- Website: www.montepiedad.com.mx/portal/index.html

The Nacional Monte de Piedad is a not-for-profit institution and pawnshop whose main office is located just off the Zócalo, or main plaza of Mexico City. It was commanded to be built between 1774 and 1777 by Don Pedro Romero de Terreros, the Count of Regla as part of a movement to provide interest-free or low-interest loans to the poor. It was recognized as a national charity in 1927 by the Mexican government. Since the first decade of the 21st century it has been a fast-growing institution, with over 200 branches all over Mexico and plans to open a branch in every Mexican city.

== Main office ==
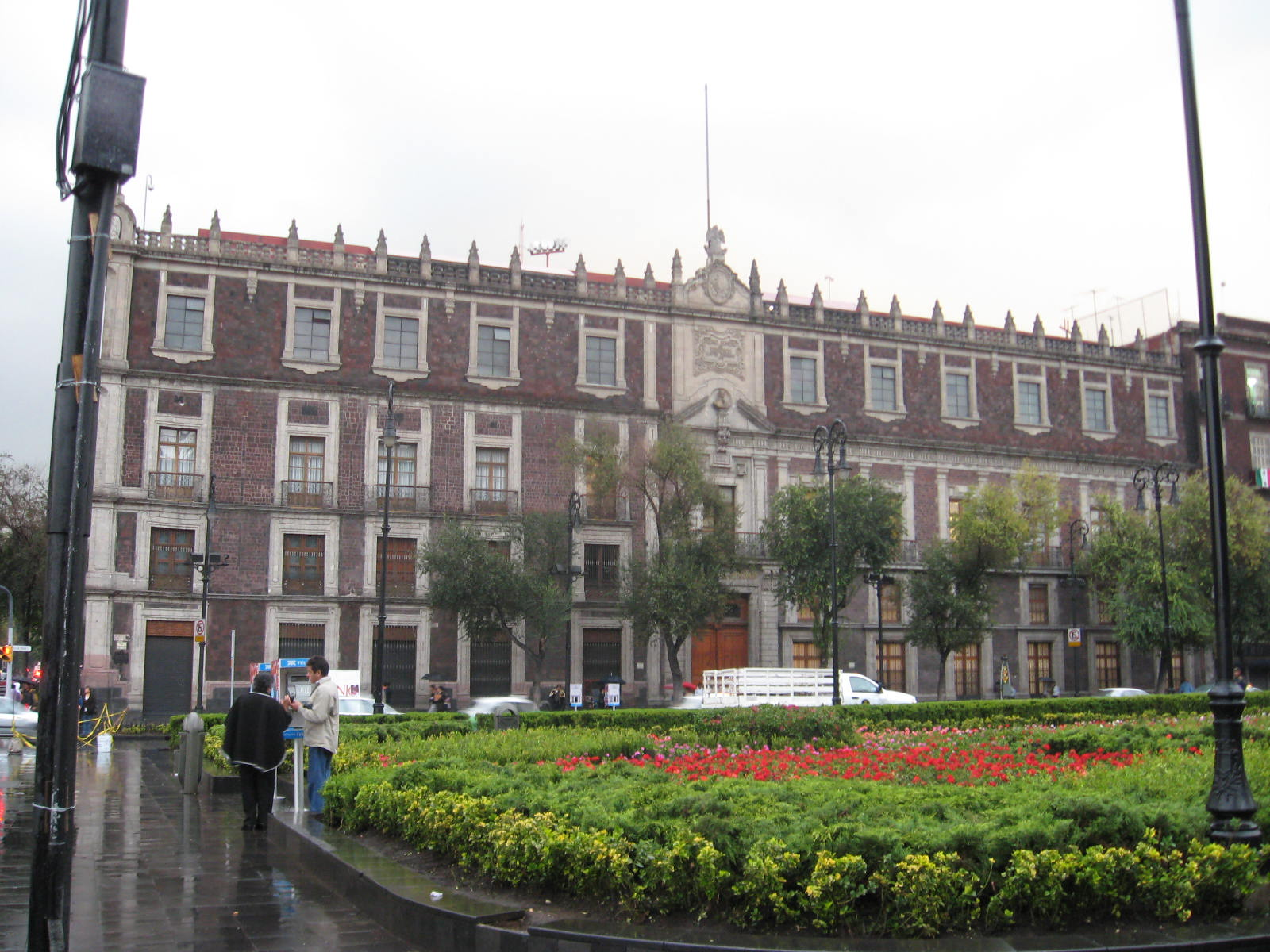
National Monte de Piedad Building off the Zócalo in Mexico City.

The main office is located on the northwest corner of the Zocalo on the corner of Monte de Piedad and 5 de Mayo Streets. Despite having gone through considerable modifications, it once was part of the estate owned by Hernán Cortés (1485–1547). In the area were the "Old Houses" of Moctezuma II's father, Axayacatl (1453?-1483). At the time of Cortes’ arrival, Moctezuma lived in the "New Houses" across what is now the main plaza where the National Palace now stands. The dimensions of the original residence was so great, extending as far as modern-day Avenida Madero, Isabel la Católica, Calle Tacuba and Monte de Piedad streets, that chronicler Francisco Cervantes de Salazar once stated that it was not a palace, but rather a city itself. Other observers compared the complex to the Cretan labyrinth where the Minotaur was imprisoned. The original structure had two floors and a series of smaller buildings that Cortés rented to traders. The main building used to house the Royal Tribunal and was the residence of two of the early viceroys of New Spain. In 1615, it was divided into lots for sale.
The tezontle stone façade of the current building dates from 1775, and at the peak above the main door is the coat of arms of the Count of Regla. In the main doorway there is the coat of arms of Mexico and a bust of Don Pedro Romero de Terreros. The inside of the building has been completely modified except for a few details. The third floor was added in 1948. What had been Cortés's accounting room while he was the Marquis of the Valley of Oaxaca, became a chapel and remained so until 1926. Since then, it has been a museum, housing painting by José de Páez from 1775, building decorations from the 18th and 19th centuries, cancellation stamps, paper money and certificates from 1880 and the building's original statues.

This building was extensively remodeled in 1984, with a number of projects. The outside walls of the building were cleaned, refurbishing the wood and ironwork of the portals and balconies, then sealing them against the effects of pollution. Floors, patios and columns were stripped and polished. Protections were placed on each appraiser's window and the art salon was enlarged.

A fire, due to a short circuit, damaged this building on 17 April 2004. It began in the cashiers and appraisers’ rooms where 10 people were working on remodeling project at the time. Fire was seen on the ground and first floors of the building; however, no pawned items were damaged.

== The institution ==
=== Origins and history ===
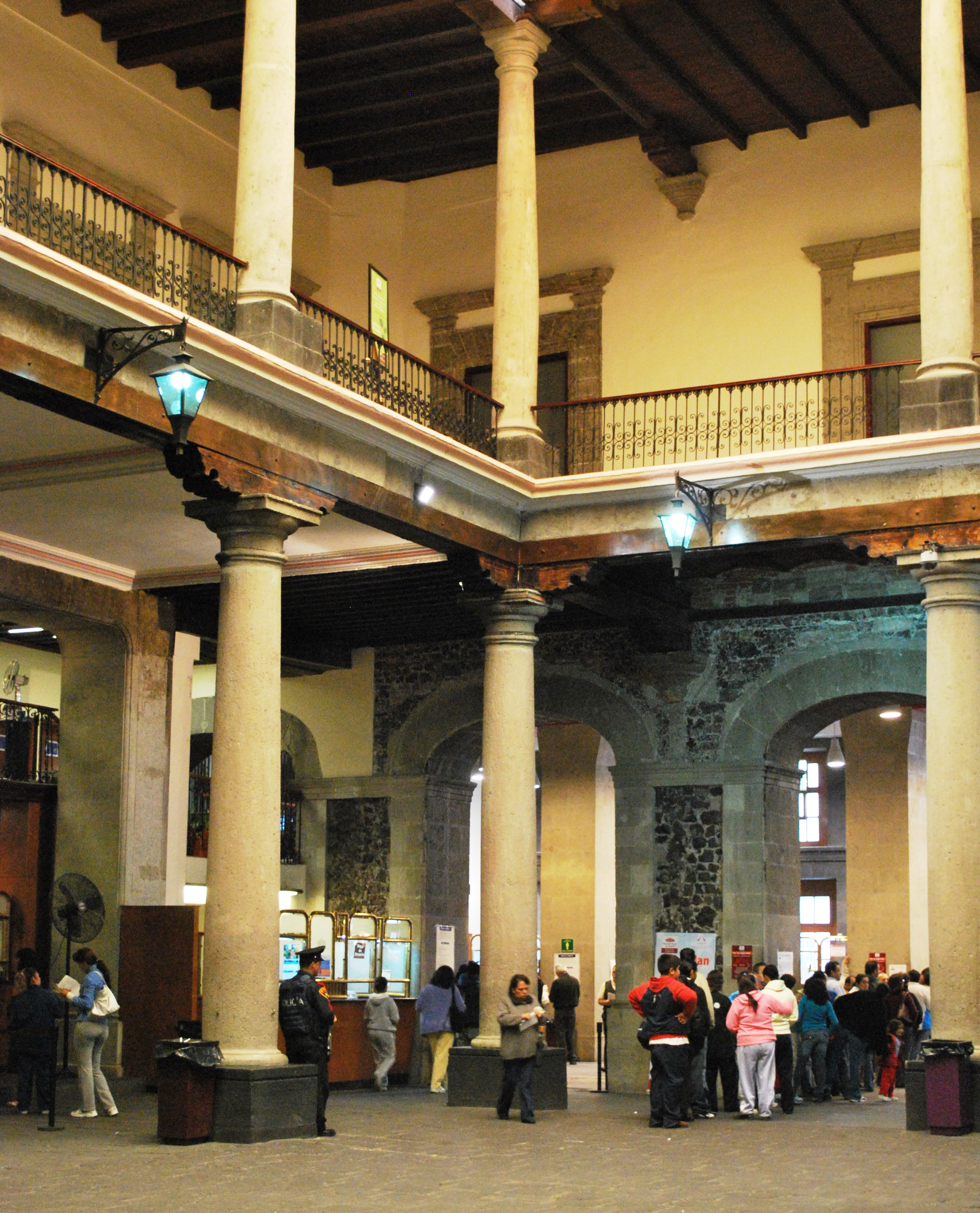
One of the rooms inside the building

The Monte di Pietà movement began in Perugia, Italy, in 1450 with the Franciscan Order. It had the aim of providing financial assistance to people in the form of no-interest loans. Instead of interest, borrowers were urged to make donations to the Church. It spread first through Italy then in other parts of Europe. The first Monte de Piedad organization in Spain was founded in Madrid, and from there the idea was transferred to New Spain by Pedro Romero de Terreros, the Count of Santa María de Regla and Knight of Calatrava.

Terreros (1710–1781) was born in Spain and arrived to Mexico in 1730, where he founded a number of enterprises including the Real del Monte silver mine in the modern-day state of Hidalgo. He founded the Sacro y Real Monte Pío de Animas between 1774 and 1777 with approval of the Spanish king Charles III, authorizing him the use of part of the College of Saints Peter and Paul, where the main office is today. Terreros initially funded the project by donating 300,000 pesos of gold. As with other Monte de Piedad institutions, Terreros's foundation did not charge interest on the loans that it gave and also urged borrowers to make donations to Church institutions, especially the College of Saints Peter and Paul. He also urged borrowers to attend church and pray as a way to help them spiritually as well as financially.

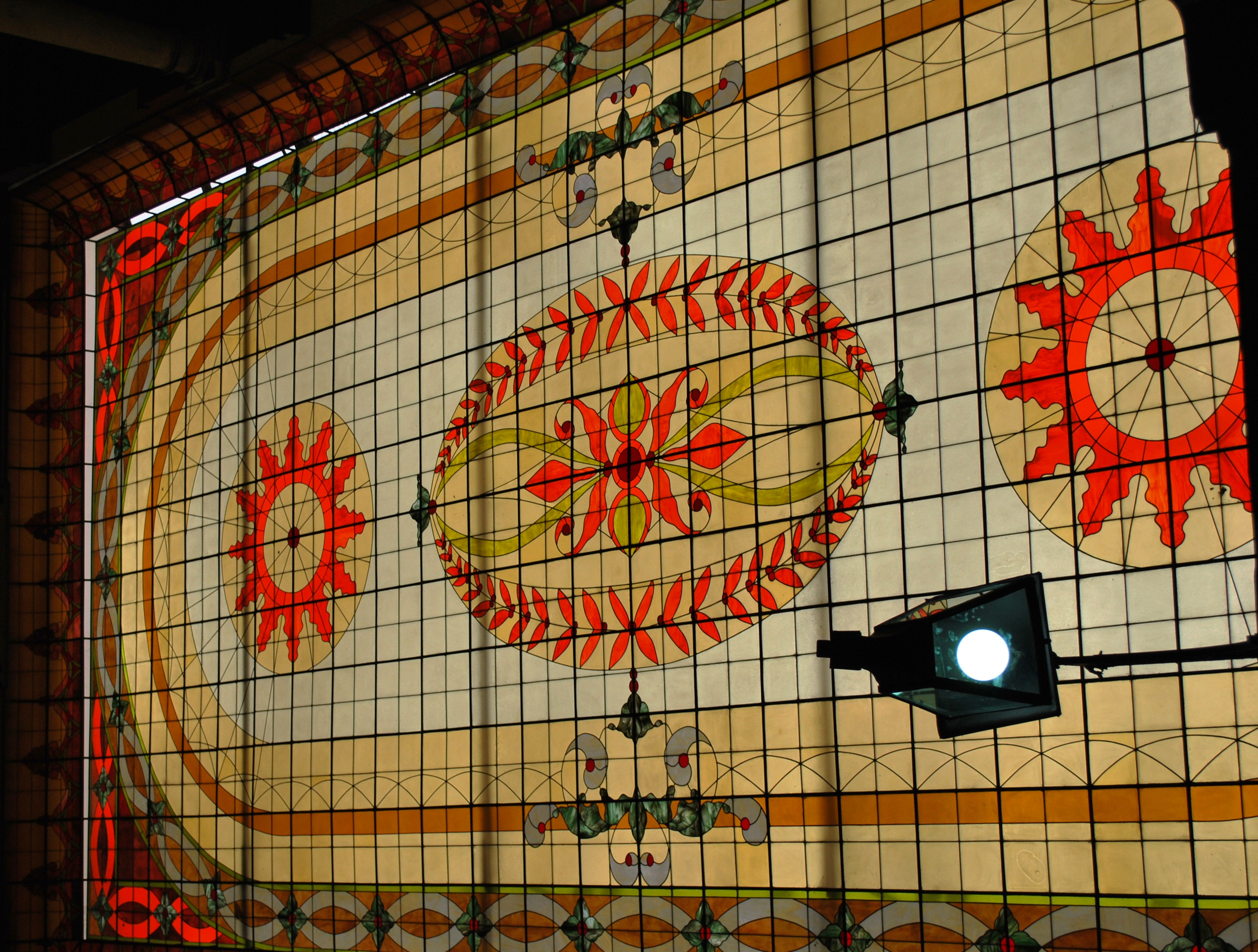
One of the colored skylights in the building

Operations began in 1775 in the College of Saints Peter and Paul and where the current main office is now. In 1818, Don Viceroy Apodaca ordered the evacuation of the building due to problems with the Independence movement but this did not happen until 1821, when King Ferdinand VII confiscated Jesuit properties. The foundation moved to the Franciscan Convent of Saint Bridget that was on Juárez Avenue and San Juan de Letrán Street (now Eje Central). It moved again in 1836 to two houses on Empedradillo Street off a difference section of the Zocalo that were owned by the Duke of Monteleone, a descendant of Hernan Cortés. Some time after the College of Saints Peter and Paul moved to what is now the Colegio de San Ildefonso, the Monte de Piedad bought the old college structure and its original home from the Duke of Monteleone in 1836.

After Independence, the institution was sanctioned by the new government and gained its current name. In the beginning of the 19th century, mismanagement, loans forced by the government and political unrest caused serious financial problems for Monte de Piedad. However, before the end of the same century, the institution was so financially solvent that it began to issue its own money (called confidential certificates of deposit) worth up to six million pesos in 1881. In that same year, it opened its first branches in San Luis Potosí, Oaxaca and Puebla, but these closed within a short time. In 1927, by presidential decree, Monte de Piedad was declared legally as an institution of "Beneficiencia Privada" (private charity).

=== Primary functions ===
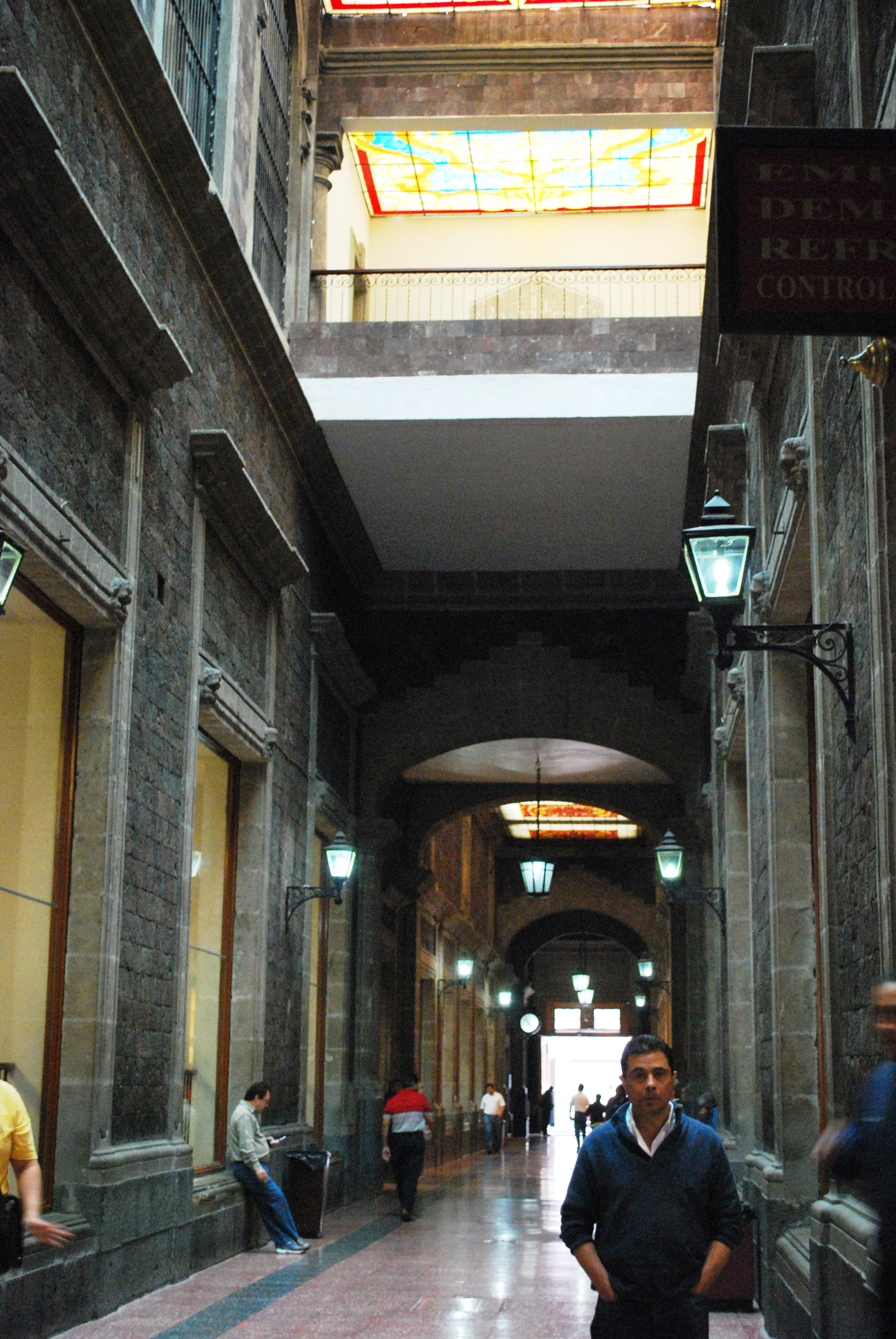
Main hallway of the building

Since its foundation, it has had two unchanged fundamental objectives. The first and foremost is with respect to loans to families with emergency needs, giving the most favorable conditions possible and without considering possible financial gain to the institution. Its first and primary lending strategy is microloans secured through pawned objects. However, because the foundation lost significant money in its early years, the governing board decided in 1782 that it was necessary to charge fixed interest. Because they are a charitable organization, they will take items with a value as little as 30 pesos; however, the average loan is about 500 pesos. Most of the pawned items are jewelry and watches but the institution will also take a variety of objects such as cars, domestic appliances and even sheets and linens. However, it has since added some other financial services such as banking services, begun in 1878 and home equity loans, begun in 1997.

The second has to do with the money the enterprise does earn. In the past decade, the institution has donated money to more than 1,500 charities, with an average total yearly donation of between 400 and 450 million Mexican pesos. Charities include Michui Mau, who work with burned children, the Mexican Red Cross, Teleton as well as charities which work with autistic children, children with cancer, people with AIDS, victims of domestic violence, among others. In addition to these, the foundation also supports education in the way of scholarships. Monte de Piedad has been a primary sponsor of the "Beca (scholarship) Cholula" fund, first by funding one yearly 100% scholarship and now it sponsors ten students each year. This scholarship is designed for outstanding students from poor communities in Puebla state such as San Andrés Cholula, San Pedro Cholula, Santa Isabel Cholula and San Gregorio Atzompa to attend UDLA, a private university. So far it has donated a total of 900,000 pesos to the fund.

=== Current operations and growth ===
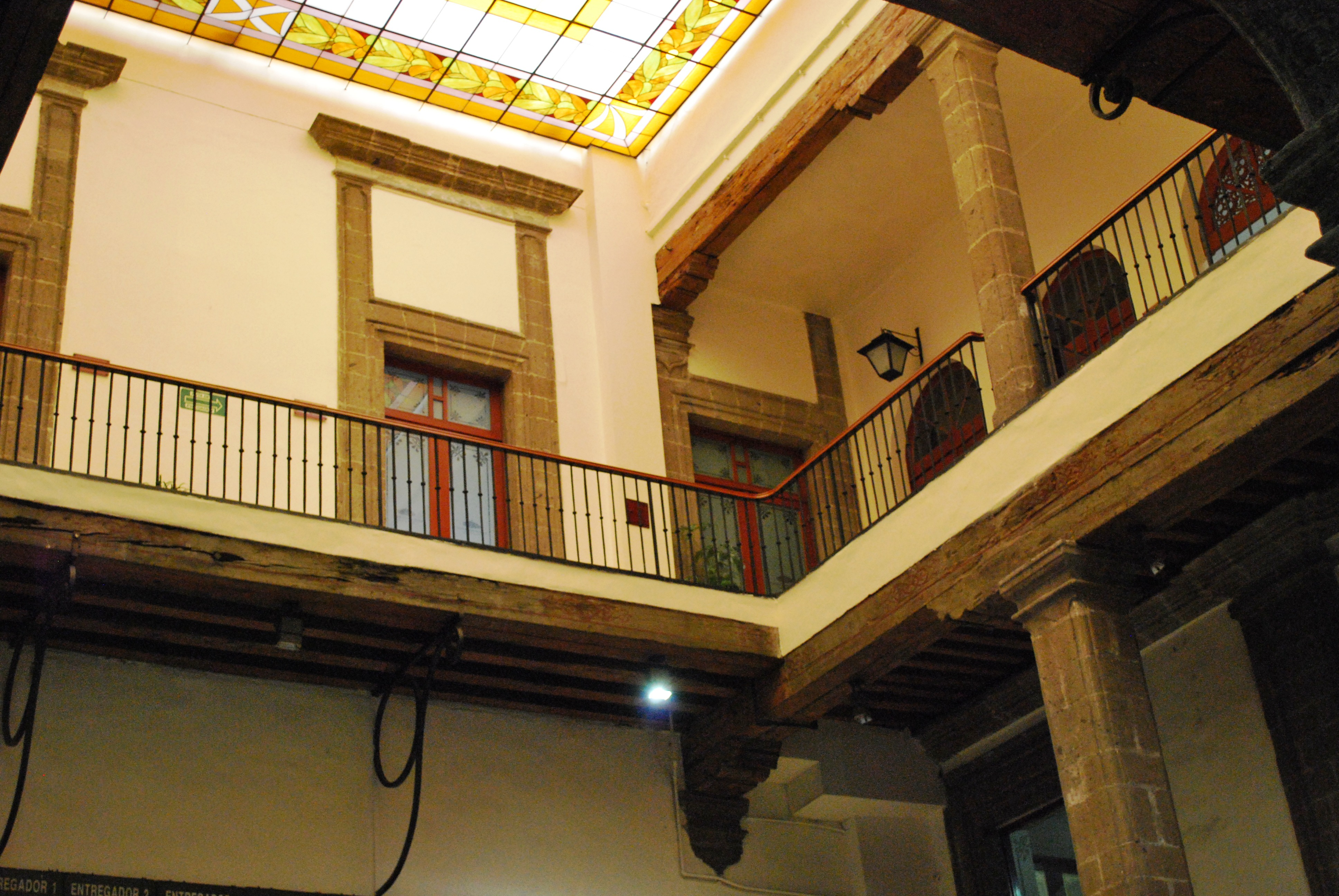
One of the rooms inside the building

The institution has become so widespread in the country, especially since the year 2000 that it is popularly referred to as "Tia (Aunt) Piedad".

From 1988 to 2000, Monte de Piedad had between 33 and 35 branches throughout Mexico, thirteen of which were in Mexico City. By January, 2008, that number had grown to 152 and there are plans to open a branch in every Mexican city. Right now the largest regional offices are in Mexico City, Monterrey, Guadalajara and Mérida. The foundation expects to extend pawn loans to 750,000 families, or about 905 million pesos in 2008. This would represent a 58% increase nationwide from 2007, upping the already 33 million pawned items that Monte de Piedad warehouses every year. The institution also expects to reach the 22 million-loan mark in 2008. Similar growth and projections have been reported in the various regional offices such as those in Culiacán and Mérida.

Loans can be for any purpose but Monte de Piedad reports that many are to remodel houses, send children to college or to start a business. There has also been a rise in people seeking loans to cover overdrafts of their credit cards. However, many loans are for expenses related to back-to-school, vacations periods (esp. Holy Week) and January, after the Christmas holidays.

Back to school loans occur in late August and early September. It represents the third busiest season for Monte de Piedad. Back to school costs usually include, school supplies, uniforms, shoes, backpacks as well as textbooks and can include specialty costs such as supplies for physics and art classes.

The busiest season for Monte de Piedad is in January, after the holidays, and second is the period around Holy Week vacations. However, during every major holiday and vacation period, people can be seen lining up at Monte de Piedad offices to finance their celebrations before or after the fact. Méndez Tapia, spokesman for Monte de Piedad, states that there is not a credit card mentality in Mexico, but pawning has long been part of the financial culture, especially for Mexicans with scarce resources.

Monte de Piedad's interest rate on pawned items is four percent, with seventeen months to recover pawned items. The recovery rate is 96%. For-profit pawn shops charge between twelve and twenty-four percent interest per month. Despite the high recovery rate, every two weeks, furniture, antiques, jewelry, cars, clothing, domestic appliances and other goods which have not been reclaimed by their owners are sold off at public auction at the main office in the Zócalo in Mexico City.

== Reputation ==
In 1945, the Department of Appraisers was created with the role of training appraisers by specialty (jewelry, furniture, works of art, etc.). To maintain its reputation financially, Monte de Piedad submits its financial records to the outside scrutiny of Standard & Poor's who regularly gives them a high approval rating. The institution has also been certified by AENOR. Legally speaking, the foundation works with legal authorities such as the Attorney General of the State of Chihuahua, signing agreements designed to thwart those who try to pawn stolen items.

However, the institution has had labor issues. Retirees and active employees of Monte de Piedad protested in 2007, stating that the institution lied to them stating that they were enrolled in IMSS when they were not. Protesters stated that they had not realized the violation for so long because the company provided private health insurance. In subsequent legal action, the Junta Federal de Conciliación y Arbitraje (Federal Comisión of Conciliación and Arbitration) ruled against Monte de Piedad in a suit filed by about 350 employees of the firm.
