= Pedro Romero de Terreros =

Spanish merchant and philanthropist (1710–1781)

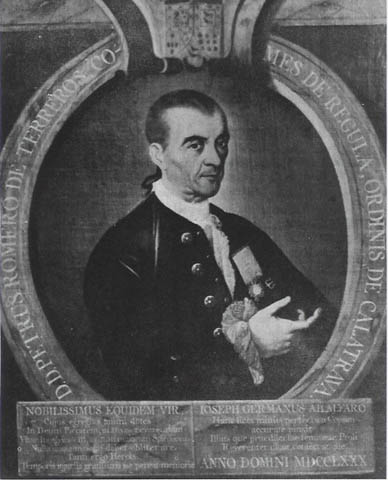
- Born: Pedro Romero de Terreros; June 28, 1710; Cortegana, Spain
- Died: 1781 (aged 70–71); Huasca de Ocampo, New Spain
- Occupations: Merchant, philanthropist

Pedro Romero de Terreros, Count of Regla (June 28, 1710 – 1781) was a Spanish merchant and philanthropist.

== Early life ==
Pedro Romero de Terreros was born in Cortegana, Spain, on June 28, 1710, the fifth of six children and fourth son of Ana Gómez and José Romero de Terreros. His parents had little land or wealth but were related to the two largest landowners in Cortegana. Pedro and his brothers were all literate, although no documentation has been found as to how they were educated. Pedro showed signs of having a superior intellect, and his parents originally considered having him trained for the priesthood.

In his study De Nobleza Inmemorial, genealogist Erik Andrés Reynoso y Márquez, Lord of Tejada, establishes the ancestry of Pedro Romero de Terreros through an examination of parish records from Cortegana and the subject's own 1752 dossier for the Order of Calatrava. This research confirms that his forebears were commoners, demonstrating the absence of noble blood in his lineage prior to his own rise.

It is likely that Romero de Terreros began his career as a clerk in Puerto de Santa María. There would have been little opportunity for advancement, and the pay would have been very low. As a younger son, Romero de Terreros would not have received the same support from his parents as his elder brothers received, and he would have needed to find his own way. Several members of his extended family had previously emigrated to the New World and operated successful businesses there, and his eldest brother Francisco had emigrated in 1723 to work for their uncle Juan Vázquez Terreros; Francisco died in Mexico in 1728.

About 1730, Romero de Terreros traveled to Mexico. According to a contemporary account, Romero de Terreros's trip may originally have been to settle his brother's estate, but he chose to stay and assist his uncle. On his arrival, he followed a local practice of recent European immigrants using the honorific "don", a title which in Spain was reserved for the minor nobility (hidalgos). Romero de Terreros joined his uncle in Querétaro, the third largest city in Mexico.

On his arrival, Pedro learned that his uncle was almost bankrupt; rather than being trained, Pedro was instead almost immediately given full authority over his uncle's businesses. After his uncle's death in 1735, Romero de Terreros administered the estate. According to the will, Romero de Terreros would receive one-third of the profits from any future business, with the rest to be shared by Vázquez's children. In the will, Vázquez praised Romero de Terreros for his "activity, accuracy, and good work". By 1747, however, he settled his uncle's estate; money from the sale of the businesses was distributed to Vázquez's children.

== Career ==
Romero de Terreros showed an affinity for making money and soon brought the businesses back into profitability. In 1741, he began to invest in the Pachuca-Mineral del Monte silver mines, along with his business partner Jose Alejandro Bustamante. As his personal wealth rose, so did his social status. He served as alcalde of Querétaro, and in 1752 was given an honorary knighthood in the Order of Calatrava. Spanish King Ferdinand VI granted Romero de Terreros a special exemption so that he could be inducted into the order from Querétaro rather than have to travel to Spain for the ceremony.

Romero de Torreros' management of the mines at Pachuca and Real del Monte resulted in a miner's strike in 1766 after he abolished the workers' party, reduced wages to slave wage level, and gradually doubled the workload to gain more profits.

== Personal life ==
On June 29, 1756, Romero de Terreros married noblewoman María Antonia de Trebuesto y Dávalos. The bride was the youngest daughter of the Countess of Miravalle, whose family had lived in Mexico for over 150 years. The Miravalle family was in dire financial straits, so Trebuesto was given no dowry. Romero de Terreros promised to give her 50,000 pesos if he died first, and, as a wedding present, gave her a large amount of jewelry, including two dresses covered in diamonds, and sponsored dowries for several young women to join convents in the city. The wedding celebration lasted two days and cost over 66,000 pesos, much more than Romero de Terreros would later pay for his home in Mexico City. The ceremony was officiated by the Archbishop of Mexico Manuel Rubio y Salinas. The couple had nine children before Trebuesto died from complications of childbirth in 1766.

Romero de Terreros lobbied very hard to be elevated to the nobility. His request was granted in 1768, when he was named the first Count of Regla (Conde de Santa María de Regla).

== Colonization, charity, and mission benefaction ==
In the 1740s Romero de Terreros became a patron of the Franciscan order in Mexico. From 1745 through 1781 he gave 41,933 pesos to the Franciscan seminary College of San Fernando de México and another 91,023 pesos to the seminary College of Santa Cruz de Querétaro, as well as 100,000 pesos for the monastery in Pachuca. He met with friar Ilarione da Bergamo, an Italian Capuchin friar, who had been sent to Mexico by the Propaganda Fide to solicit alms he gave permission to do so at his mine at Real del Monte.

Romero de Terreros attempted to endow a convent on the grounds of the College of San Fernando de México in 1756, but the head of the seminary refused the request. After hearing that authorities were considering establishing a mission to the Lipan Apache tribe in Spanish Texas, Romero de Terreros volunteered to provide initial funding for the effort. He agreed to give 150,000 pesos to support twenty missionaries over a three-year-period and to purchase all church furnishings and other necessities. In return, he asked that the missionaries come from the College of San Fernando de México and the College of Santa Cruz de Querétaro, and that his cousin, Father Alonso Giraldo de Terreros, be given responsibility for the mission.

After three years, the government would pay mission expenses, and the government would also fund a garrison to protect the missionaries. Unlike most missions, this one would report to the viceroy instead of the governor. Mission Santa Cruz de San Sabá was established in 1757. The mission was destroyed, and Father Terreros killed, the following year by Comanche who were angered that the Spanish had allied with the Comanche's traditional enemies, the Apache.

Besides his support for the Catholic Church in Mexico, Romero de Terreros also gave funds to civil authorities. He funded a battleship for the Spanish Navy.

Between 1774 and 1777, Romero de Terreros established the Monte de Piedad, a charitable institution and pawnshop, as an attempt to provide interest-free or low-interest loans to the poor.

== Art ==
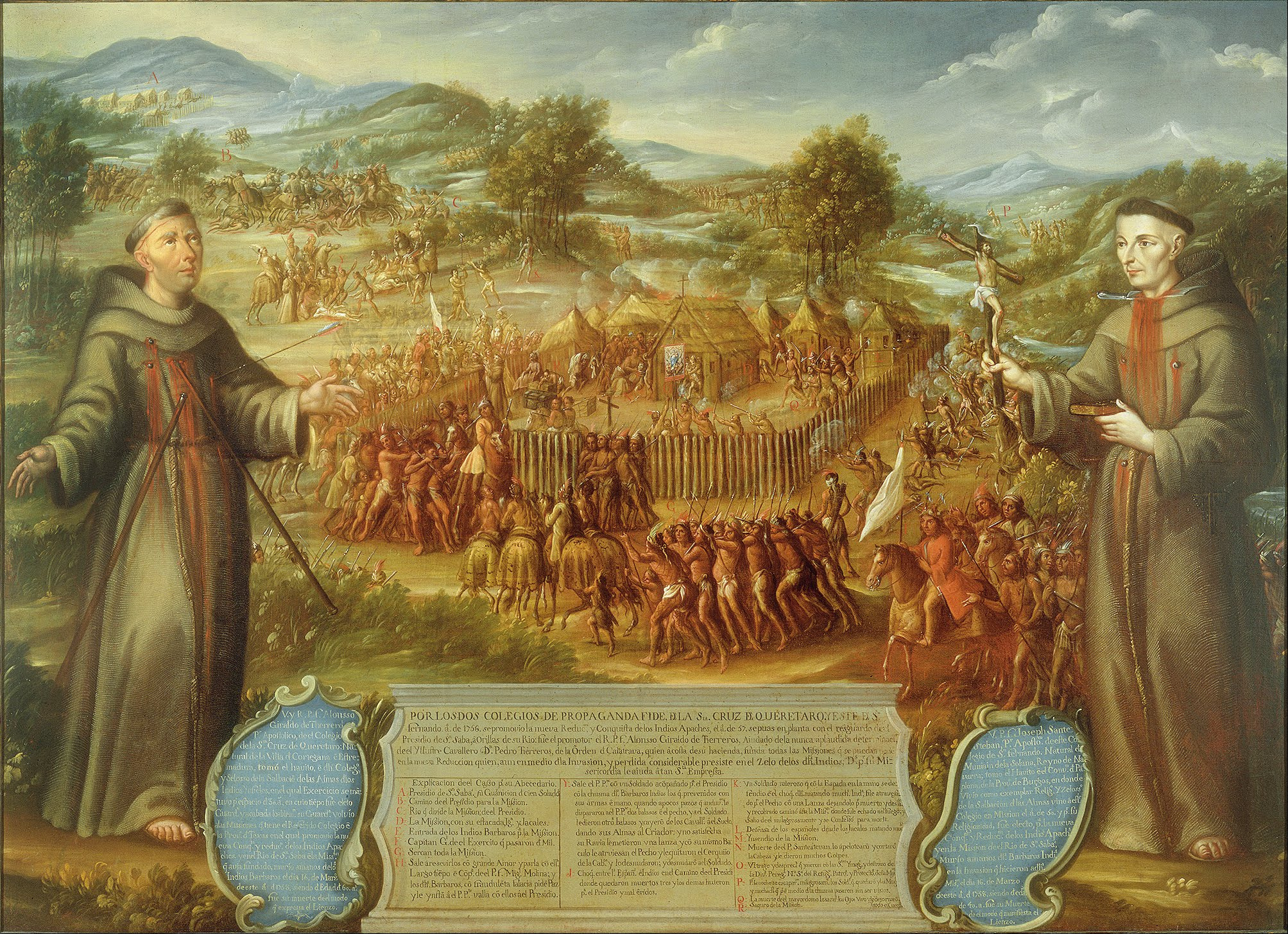
The destruction of the mission of San Sabá in the province of Texas. Oil on canvas. 237 x 527.5 cm. ca. 1765. Museo Nacional de Arte, Mexico. An English translation of the inscription is found on the article on painter José de Páez.

In 1762, Romero de Terreros commissioned a painting to honor his cousin who had died in the attack on the San Sabá mission. The resulting The Destruction of Mission San Sabá in the Province of Texas and the Martyrdom of the Fathers Alonso Giraldo de Terreros, Joseph Santiesteban is the earliest painting known to depict a historical event in Texas. According to the Handbook of Texas, the painting is "the only such work executed in Mexico in the mid-1700s that attempted to document a contemporary historical event". It remained in the Terreros family for the next 200 years.

== Legacy ==
Beginning in 1750, Romero de Terreros retained every letter addressed to him as well as most of his written business records. His descendants preserved this archive. Some of the records now reside at Washington State University, while the rest remain with the family. According to his biographer Edith Boorstein Couturier, "no equivalent archives exist for other important eighteenth-century figures".

Terreros has been the subject of many biographies, starting with an 1858 tome written by his great-grandson, Juan Ramón Romero de Terreros. Another of his descendants, Manuel Romero de Terreros, wrote the first modern biography of him in 1943, but Courturier calls this book "a hagiographic and uncritical account". In the decades since, Terreros has been written about several times, largely in terms of his impact into labor relations within Mexico.

== See also ==
- Real del Monte

== Sources ==
- Chipman, Donald E. (1992), Spanish Texas, 1519–1821, Austin, TX: University of Texas Press, ISBN 0-292-77659-4
- Couturier, Edith Boorstein (2003), The Silver King: The Remarkable Life of the Count of Regla in Colonial Mexico, University of New Mexico Press, ISBN 0-8263-2874-1
- Ratcliffe, Sam D. (April 1991), ""Escenas de Martirio": Notes on The Destruction of Mission San Saba", Southwestern Historical Quarterly, 94 (4), Texas State Historical Association: 507–534
- Reynoso y Márquez, Erik Andrés (2026), De Nobleza Inmemorial: Genealogía y poder en los linajes de Nueva Galicia, Nueva España y el obispado de Michoacán, ISBN 979-8251121155
