= Ilarione da Bergamo =

- Born: 1727
- Died: 1778 (aged 50–51)
- Occupation: Capuchin Friar

Ilarione da Bergamo (1727?-1778) was an Italian Capuchin friar, who wrote an account of his travels in New Spain (colonial Mexico) 1761–1768. The narrative remained in manuscript form until its publication in Italian in 1976. A translation to English was published in 2000. He likely took his name from the town of Bergamo, near Milan; little is known of his life beyond his religious profession and his travel narrative.

He was sent by the Vatican's Propaganda Fide to Mexico collect alms for the Capuchin missions in Tibet, one of seven friars. He returned to Italy after seven years of mission work and began composing his travel account. His manuscript is nearly three hundred of neat, handwritten pages, which includes two maps, one of central New Spain and the other of the Valley of Mexico, as well as illustrations of native plants, and two of Indians' dwellings. The maps, dwellings, and some botanical illustrations are reproduced in the English translation.

He describes his travel from Italy to Spain, sea voyage to the Caribbean and then to Mexico and his impressions of the port of Veracruz, the capital Mexico City, and the silver mines of Real del Monte in northern New Spain. There are chapters on foods and plants of New Spain, medicine, occupations and amusements, "miscellaneous topics and disasters", and religious life in the colony. Tensions between Spanish Capuchins and the Italians resulted in the Italian Capuchin's expulsion from Mexico.
