= Matamoros strike =

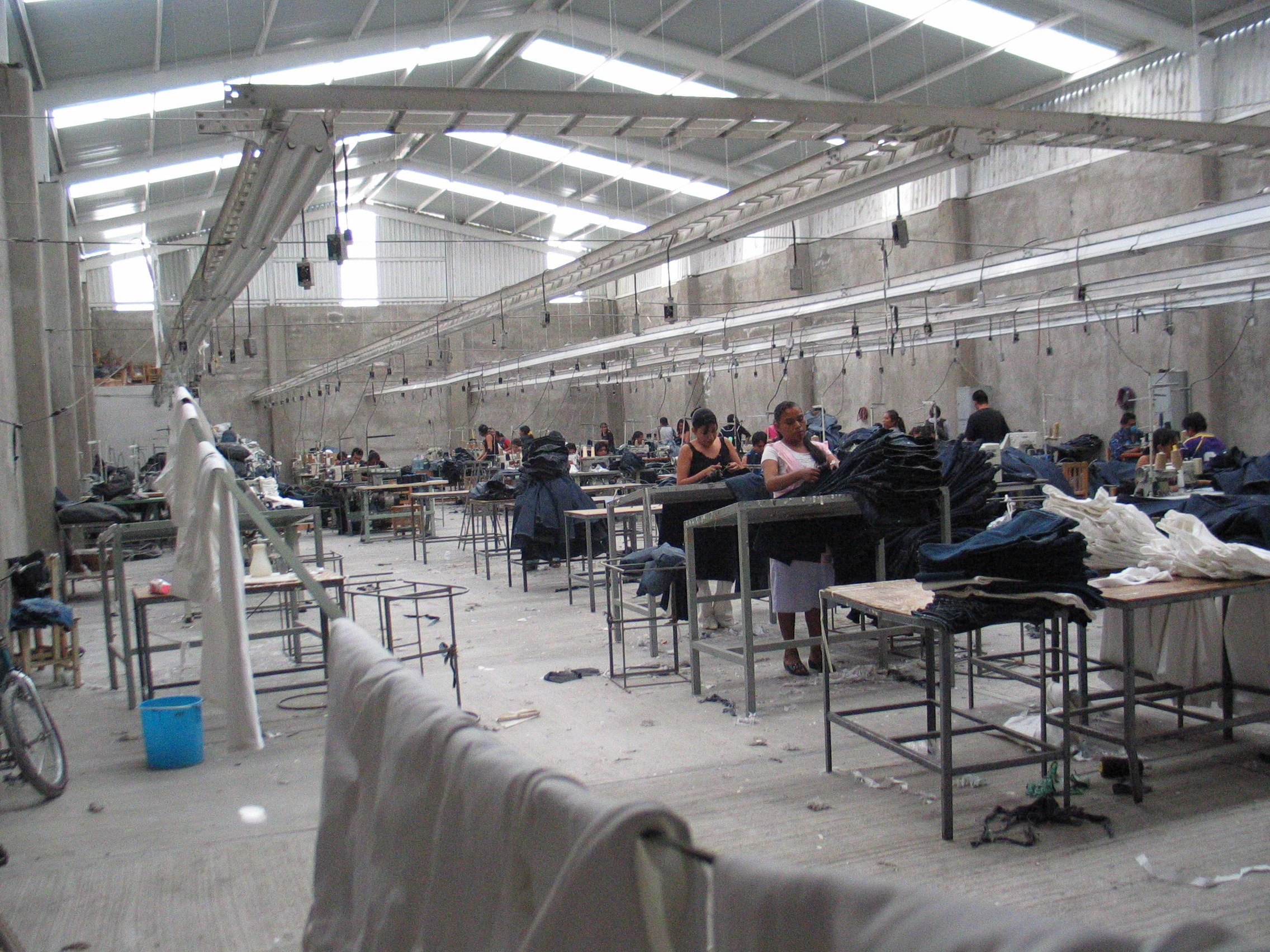
- A Maquiladora factory in Mexico.
- Objective: Demands for a 20% increase in pay and a $1,700 bonus in dozens of factories and workplaces along the Mexico-US border.
- Date: January 12, 2019

The Matamoros Strike in Matamoros, Tamaulipas is a strike of tens of thousands of Maquiladora workers that began in January, 2019 and is ongoing. The workers, whose manufacturing activity on the Mexico–United States border is tightly linked to the American manufacturing economy, have low wages relative to local living costs and have demanded 20% pay increases and bonuses. While dozens of companies have accepted workers' demands, others have not and the strikes have spread into other industries.

== Background ==
Matamoros, in Tamaulipas near the US-Mexican border, is one of Mexico's largest electronics and auto parts producers. Mexico has attracted over 5,000 Maquilladora plants into the country, most of them foreign-owned, by paying workers very low wages. The cost of living for workers on the US-Mexico border is higher than in other locations in Mexico. One striking worker told reporters that he worked 12 hours a day and six days a week for an hourly wage of 75 cents, and that exhaustion and poor safety practices led to frequent accidents. Because maquiladora factories in Matamoros don't pay local taxes, local medical services are underfunded. Matamoros workers decided they would strike for higher pay after Mexican president Andres Manuel Obrador doubled the minimum wage in Mexican states along the border, while Metamoros wages did not increase.

While Mexico had seen little labor action in years prior to the strike, grievances against companies, union and labor leaders were common in Metamoros, which had become a hub for cheap labor.

== Strike ==
On 12 January 2019, 25,000–70,000 maquiladora workers in Matamoros, Mexico went on strike. Striking workers were employees of 45 different factories including AFX, Aipsa, Autoliv, Cepillos, Edemsa, Inteva, Kemet, Parker, Polytech, Starkey, STC, and Tyco. Workers organized their efforts through Facebook, and called for a 20% increase in wages, a $1,700 bonus, lower union dues and a 40-hour work week. Some strikes occurred without the approval of the local union, the Union of Workers in Maquiladora and Assembly plants (SIPTME), and workers stated that the success of their strikes occurred despite the efforts of unions, which they described as corrupt. Striking workers told the World Socialist Web Site that some companies were withholding salaries owed to workers from prior to the strike.

On 17 January the workers marched across the city from factory to factory calling for "unity" and asking other workers to "walk out." Workers also protested against unions, and called for a national strike of all workers in Mexico. One week into the strike, economists estimated that the strike was costing the maquiladora industry $23,000 per minute, and had disrupted supplies to General Motors, Ford Motor Company and Chrysler. The next day, hundreds of maquiladora workers at Aptiv in the town of Reynosa were fired for striking in solidarity with Matamoros workers. Matamoros strikes were reported to be patrolled by the Mexican police and Navy. On 21 January, the strike was reported to have slowed production at Ford and General Motors assembly plants in Michigan.

On 26 January, The Associated Press reported that nine companies had agreed to meet demands put forward by the Union of Maquiladora Industry Industrial Workers of Matamoros (SJOIIM), and another had announced its plan to leave Matamoros. The union's leader Juan Villafuerte stated that he hoped the strike would be shortly concluded. A few days later, economists estimated that the strike was costing the auto industry $50 million every day.

As of 1 February the number of plants experiencing strike action had declined from 45 to 25, while other facilities and industries joined the strike. Striking maquiladora workers were joined by workers from the Spellman, Tapex and Toyoda Gosei factories, and by water purification, milk production, delivery, and Coca-Cola workers. Strikes also occurred in Michoacan and Oaxaca states, where 30,000 teachers blocked train lines. President Obrador stated that the teacher's strikes had "nothing to do with left-wing politics" and were instead "conservative." Workers from Autoliv stated that after the company accepted their demands to end the strike, it fired many of them without severance in retaliation for the strike.

By 9 February, 48 maquiladora factories had agreed to worker demands, and ended strikes at those facilities.

== Media coverage ==
One week into the Matamoros strike, it had still received no news coverage from the U.S.-based New York Times and Washington Post, or the Mexican papers El Universal and Reforma.

Mexican newspapers described the strike as a major event in Mexico. The newspaper Milenio wrote that some feared the strike was a "contagion" on the border, while Manufactura.mx, an industry website, wrote that workers had been "contaminated" by wage increase demands.

== See also ==
- Real del Monte 1766 strike
- Cananea strike
- Río Blanco strike
- 2006 Oaxaca protests
