= Mineral del Monte =

Mineral del Monte, Hidalgo Real del Monte
- Town and municipality
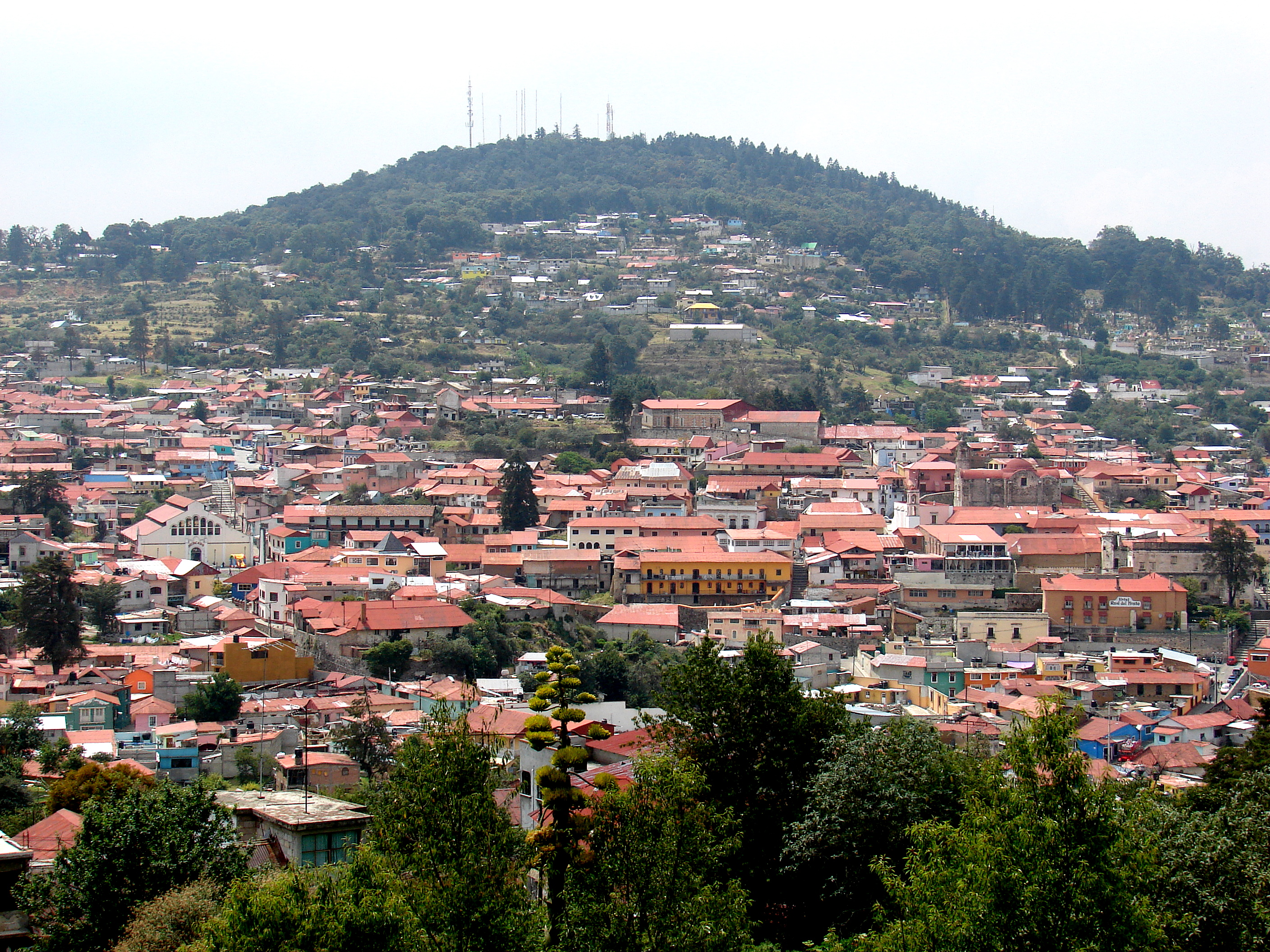
- Mineral del Monte

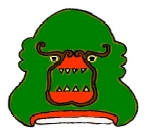
- Coat of arms
- Interactive map of Mineral del Monte, Hidalgo
- Location within Hidalgo Location within Mexico
- Coordinates: 20°08′20″N 98°40′28″W
- Country: Mexico
- State: Hidalgo
- Municipality: Mineral del Monte

Government
  - Federal electoral district: Hidalgo's 3rd

Area
  - Total: 77.1 km^{2} (29.8 sq mi)
- Elevation: 2,700 m (8,900 ft)

Population (2020)
  - Total: 14,324
- Time zone: UTC-6 (Zona Centro)
- Website: mineraldelmontehidalgo.gob.mx

Mineral del Monte, commonly called Real del Monte (Spanish: [reˈal del ˈmonte]) or El Real, or "Moon an Menydh" in Cornish is a small mining town, and one of the 84 municipalities of Hidalgo, in the State of Hidalgo in east-central Mexico.

It is located at an altitude of 2,700 metres (8,900 ft) on a mountain pass, it is the highest town in Hidalgo. As of 2020, the municipality had a total population of 14,324 — with Mauricio Rodriguez Téllez as head of the municipal council.

== Etymology ==
Mineral Del Monte was originally known as "Magotsi" by native Otomi amerindians. The name is a compound noun of "Ma" and "Gohtsi", roughly translating to "high pass"; e.g. the site of the mountain pass between Huasteca (to the east) and territories of the Otomi state of Metztitlan (to the north), and city of Tenochtitlán (Mexico City) in the west. This historic road was first seized by the Spanish in colonisation that followed the defeat of the Aztec Empire in 1519 and renamed "Real del Monte"; from the Spanish "real" meaning "kingly/royal" and "monte" for mountain. The vernacular usage of the original Otomi "Magosti" continued and eventually transmuted to "El Hiloche", this name survives but is now only applied to the forest to the west of the town.

"Mineral del monte" literally translates to "mineral of the mountain"

== History ==
The Pachuca—Real del Monte Mining District has a long and rich heritage. The mines in the district are conservatively estimated to have produced 1.2 billion Troy ounces of silver and 6.2 million ounces of gold. That is 6% of the silver mined throughout the world during the last five centuries. Some of the mines have continued limited production until the present day.

Gold and silver were discovered after the Spanish conquest of Mexico in the 1520s. The Colonial Spanish began mining in the 16th century in the Pachuca area, but the mines were suffering from flooding by 1725. In 1741, Pedro Romero de Terreros and Jose Alejandro Bustamante started a drainage program using an adit.

The native Mexican Amerindians were often enslaved to work the mines, despite the Royal mandate for Colonial Jesuit Reductions and later Franciscan Indian Reductions. In addition, Africans were imported to replace Indian slaves. The Real del Monte 1766 Strike is considered by many to be the first real labor strike in North American history.

The town's steep streets, stairways and small squares are lined with low buildings, some dating back to the Spanish colonial Viceroyalty of New Spain period (1500s - 1810). The older houses with high sloping roofs and chimneys in town show the 19th century Cornish and English influence.

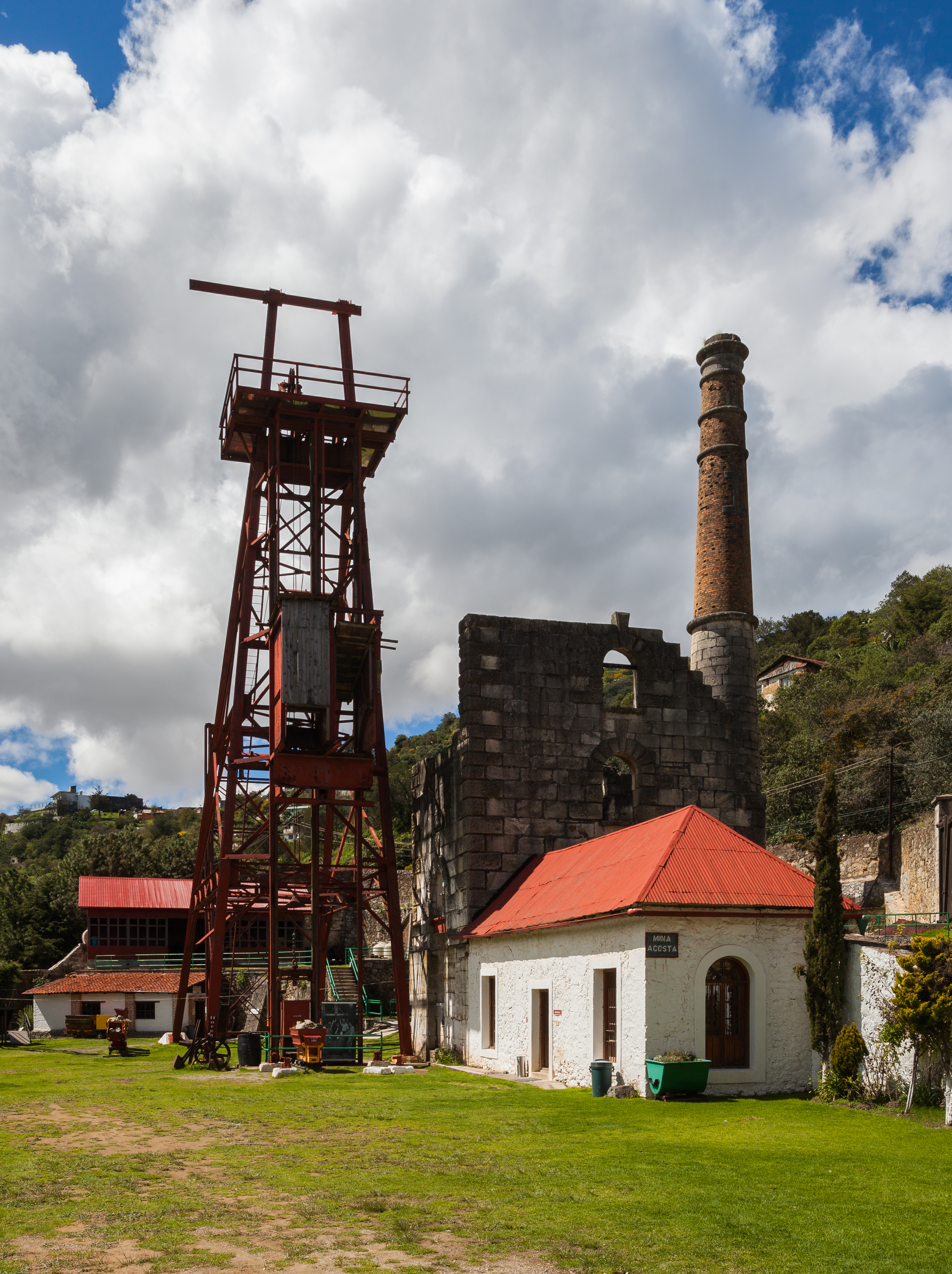
The Acosta Mine Museum

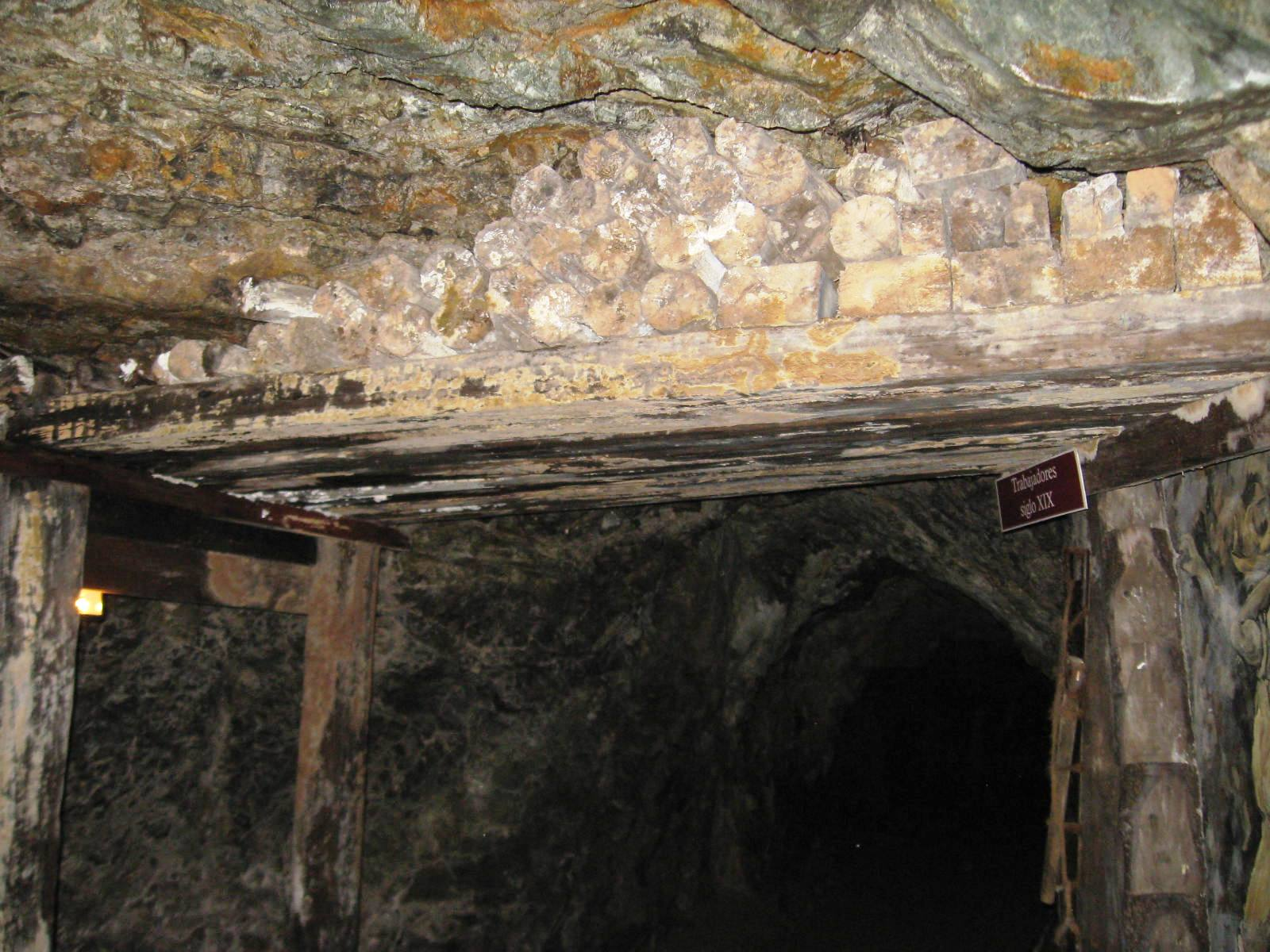
Bracing inside the Acosta Mine

=== 19th-century Cornish miners ===
==== Mining ====
The Cornish role in the development of Mexican silver mining is significant. The Cornish brought "new" mining technology of the Industrial Revolution in the 1820s, reviving Mexican silver mining. Especially important was British equipment to drain mine tunnels flooded by groundwater since the Spanish period. The majority of immigrant miners came from the Cornish Central Mining District of Camborne-Redruth-Gwennap in Cornwall. The Company of Adventurers in the Mines of Real del Monte, which operated the mines between 1824 and 1848, employed approximately 350 Cornish miners. During this period of full operation, the introduction of high-pressure steam engines and Cornish expertise transformed the district, making the municipality one of the wealthiest in the state of Hidalgo.

One of the leading personalities in 19th-century Mexico mining was Francis Rule, from Camborne in Cornwall. Known as El Rey de la Plata (Silver King), Rule left a mark on the Pachucan cityscape, with civic generosity to his adopted homeland. His opinion could be a barometer for the rise and fall of mining shares. He became very wealthy from his numerous mining interests in the district. One was the Santa Gertrudis Mine, which by 1898 was one of the most productive in the State of Hidalgo under Cornish management.

Four extant Cornish mine engine houses, and the 'English' Cemetery (Panteon Inglés) containing the graves of hundreds of Cornishmen, bear witness to the Cornish contributions to Mexican silver mining for over a century. The cemetery is undergoing restoration following storm damage in 2016.

==== Sports ====
It was the Cornish who first introduced soccer/football to Mexico (Pachuca). The first game of what would go on to be Mexico's national pastime (futbol), was first played in Mexico by Cornish miners at Pachuca in 1900, a fact that is celebrated each year. The first soccer club in the country, the Pachuca Athletic Club, was also founded in that year. The first team consisted of Charles Dawe, John Dawe, James Bennetts, John Bennetts, William Blamey, Richard Sobey, William Bragg, William Thomas, Percy Bunt, Lionel Bunt, Albert Pengelly and William Pengelly, a decidedly 'Cornish' team. The Pachuca club encouraged the formation of teams in Mexico City and Orizaba, the first championship was played in 1902 and 'El Pachuca' won the 1904-05 tournament. Also rugby union, cricket, tennis, polo, chess among other sports, were introduced here.

Methodism was introduced to Roman Catholic Mexico by the Cornish upon their arrival, and most of the descendants of the Cornish in Real del Monte and Pachuca are of Methodist faith. They brought Methodist Christianity to other major Mexican cities as they relocated. Mexican remittances helped to build the Wesleyan Chapel in Redruth, Cornwall, in the 1820s.

== Geology ==
The Pachuca-Real del Monte Mining District is at the southern end of a metalliferous mineral zone that extends northwest to encompass Mineral del Chico to the Zimapan lead-mining district to the northwest. The ore deposits occur in the volcanic Tertiary Pachuca Group, principally andesite-rhyolite flow series with intervening tuff beds. The deposits are epithermal sulfide minerals within steeply dipping normal fault veins. Acanthite and argentite are the principal silver ore minerals. Between 1973 through 1981, the Compañia de Real del Monte y Pachuca, S.A., produced 24,762,667.2 Troy ounces of silver and 133,950.33 Troy ounces of gold.

The richest vein of silver was the Veta Vizcaina, or the Vizcaina Vein, which extended 5 km to the east of Real del Monte. Productive mines along this vein included the San Francisco, Santa Agueda (1767), Santa Teresa (1734), La Joya (1734), San Cayetano (1751), Dolores (1734), and La Palma (1734). By 1750, Pedro Romero de Terreros had control of this lucrative vein. Production continued until the mid-1770s.

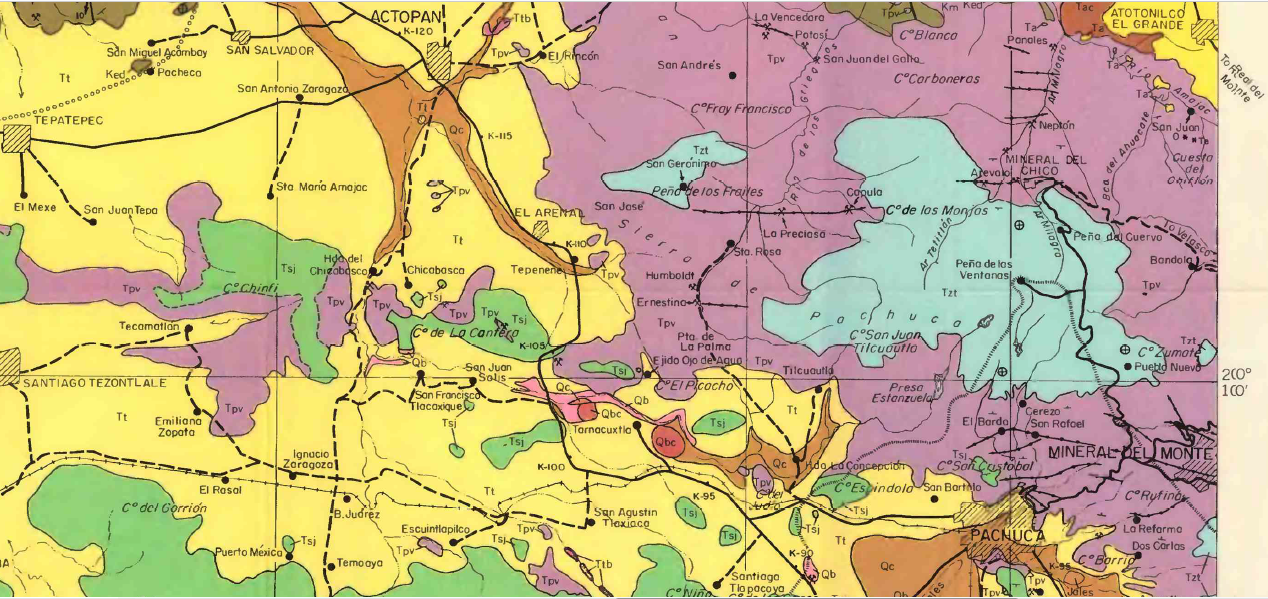
Pachuca USGS geological map of the Pachuca, Mineraldel Monte and Mineral del Chico area

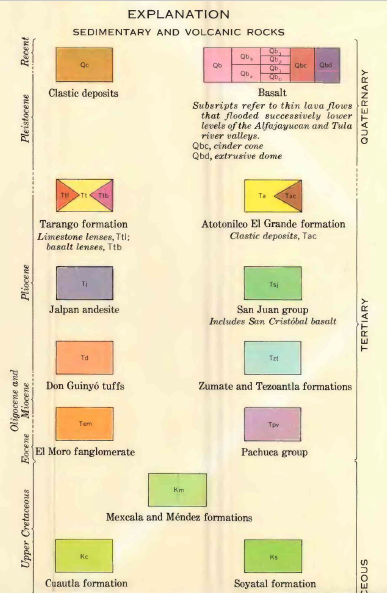
Pachuca USGS geological map legend

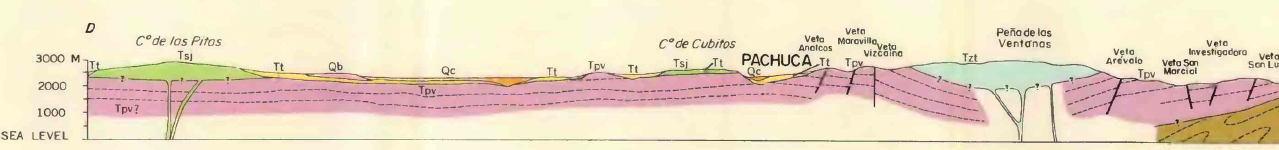
North-South Geologic Cross Section through Pachuca

== Tourism ==
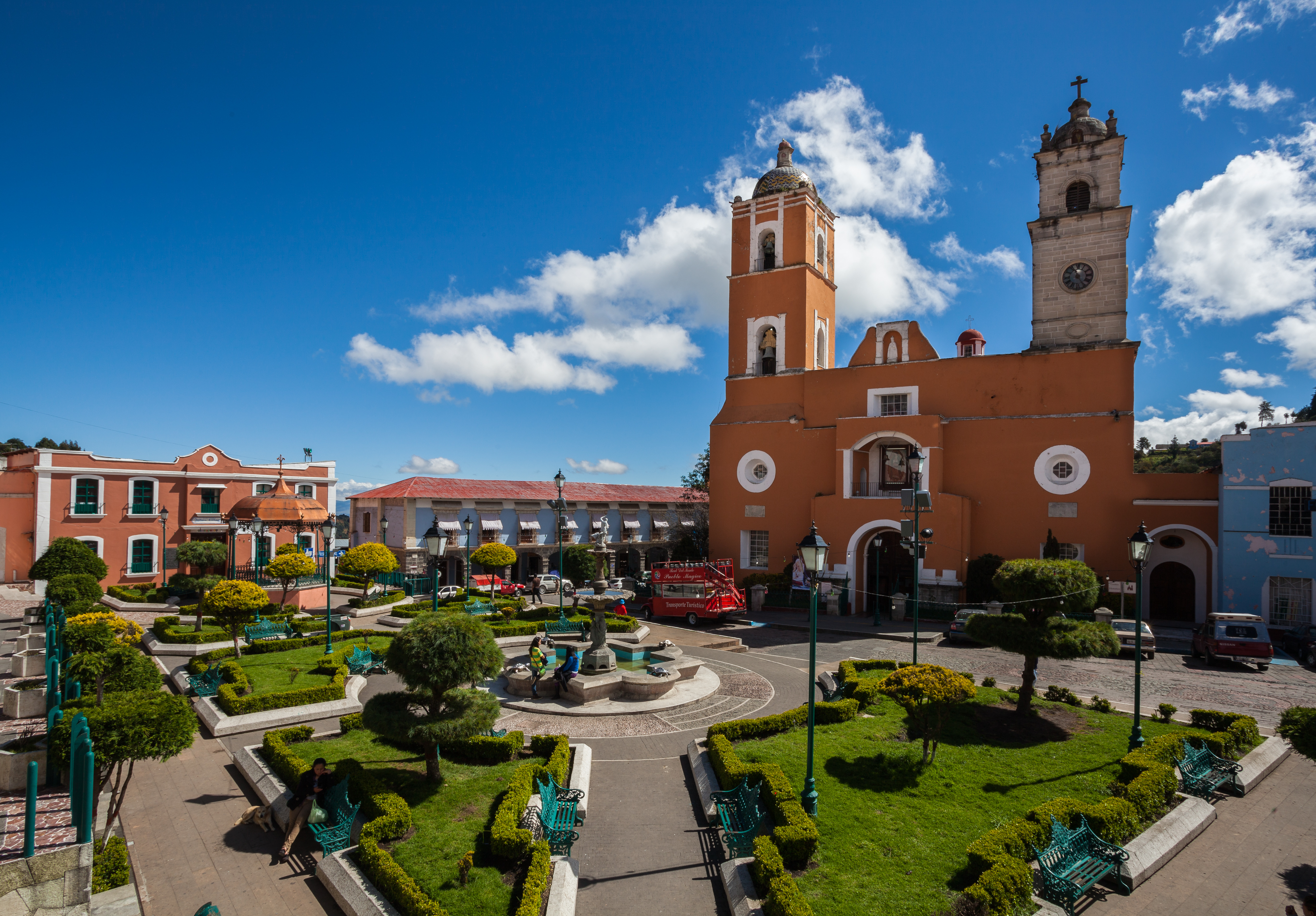
Main square with the church of Our Lady of the Rosary in the background

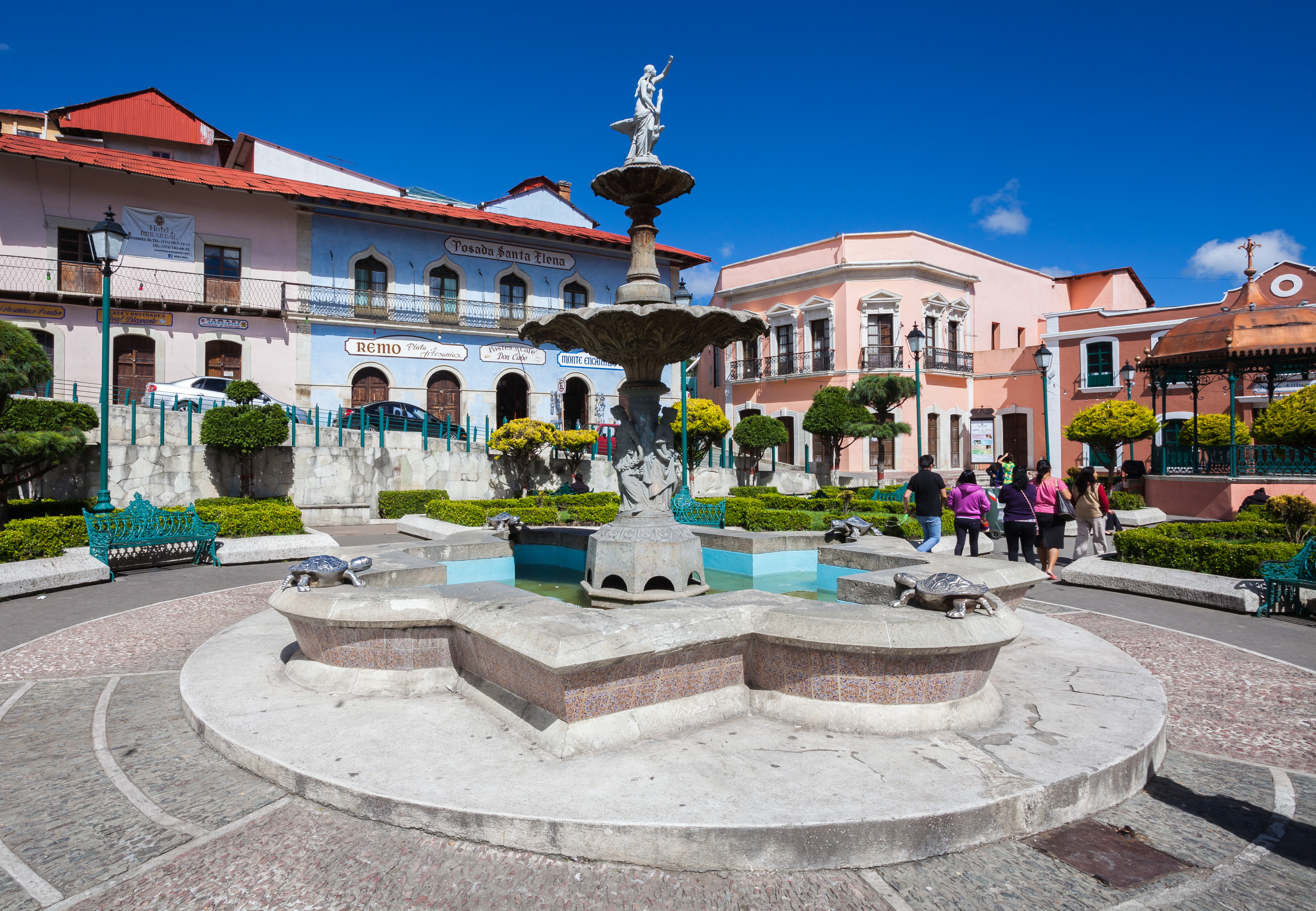
Fountain in the main square

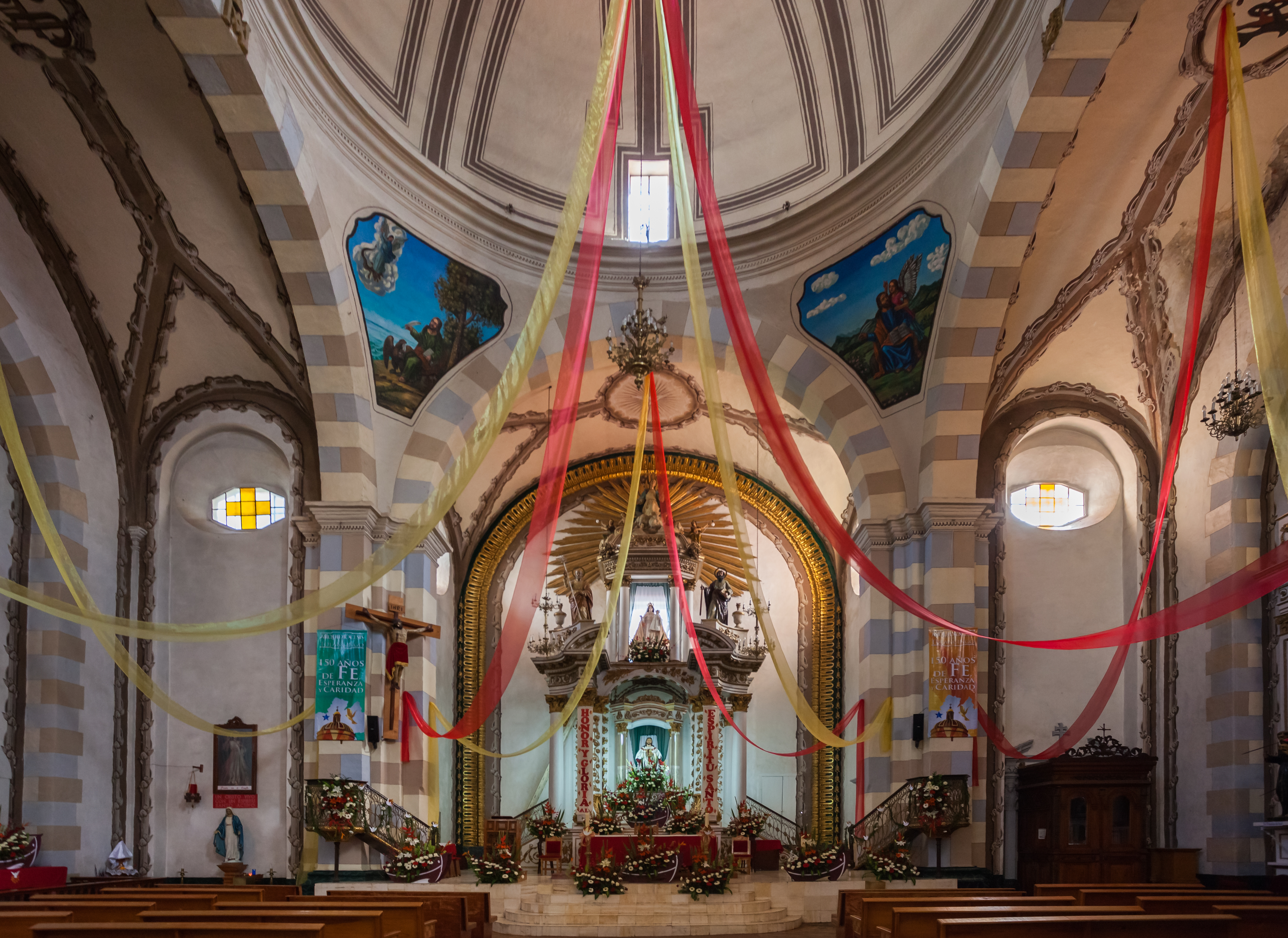
Interior of the church of Our Lady of the Ascension

Real del Monte was named a "Pueblo Mágico" by the federal government, for its unique historical qualities, aesthetics, and traditions. There are significant examples of Spanish Colonial architecture, in individual buildings and via the overall cityscape, that are preserved in the town.

=== Little Cornwall ===
The twin silver mining settlements of Pachuca and Real del Monte (Mineral del Monte) in the State of Hidalgo have been marketed as 'Mexico's Little Cornwall' by the Mexican Embassy in London since 2007. This represents the first attempt by the Spanish-speaking part of the Cornish diaspora to establish formal links with Cornwall. The Camborne Town Council voted on 19 July 2007 to twin with Pachuca and on 16 August 2007 a public meeting confirmed the earlier decision of Redruth Town Council to twin with Real del Monte. The formal twinning ceremony took place at Mineral del Monte in July 2008 during the visit of the Cornish Mexican Cultural Society.

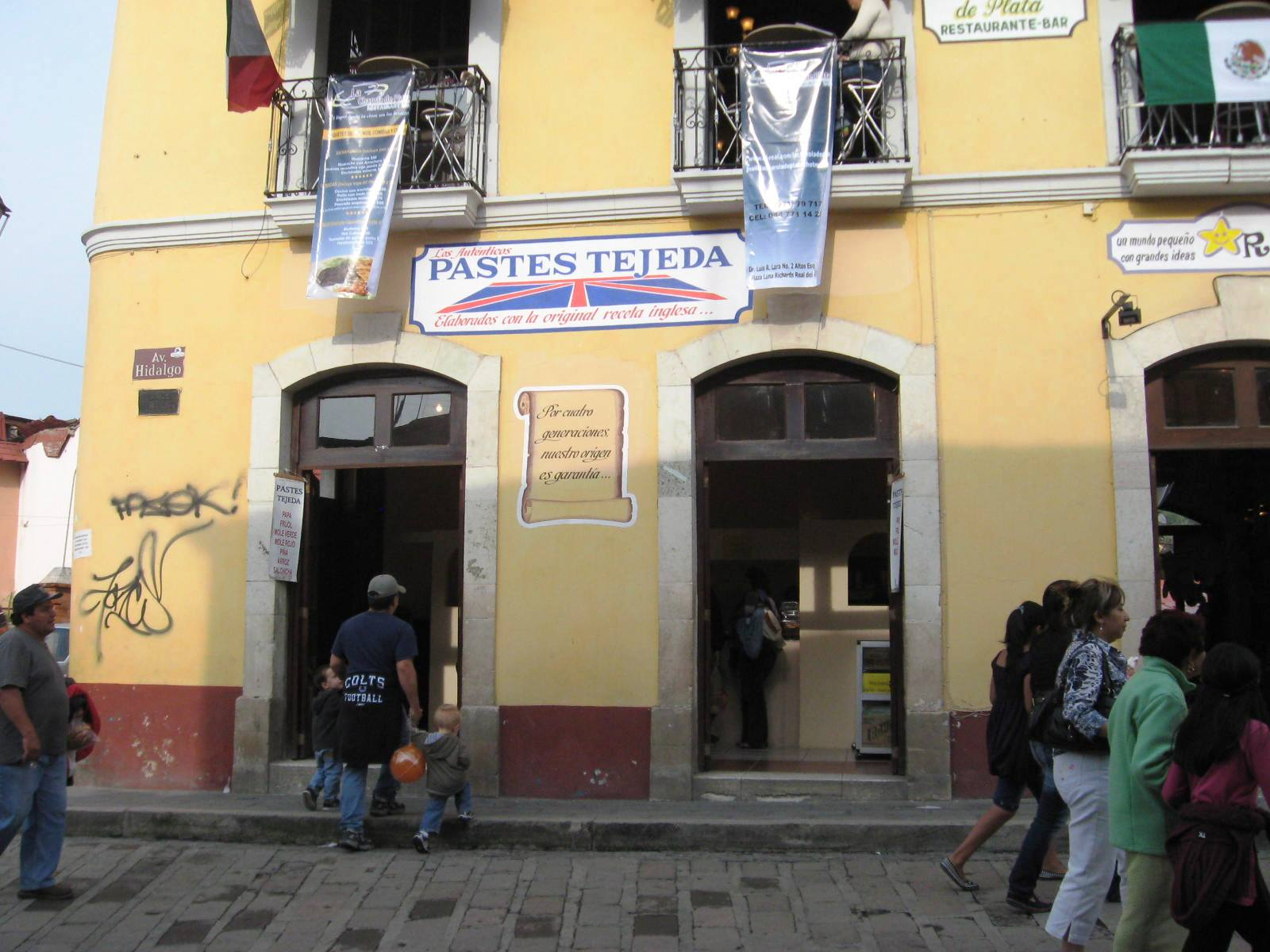
A shop selling Pastes, testament to its Cornish past

Paste

Real del Monte is a home of the paste in Mexico, with 30 paste producers in the town. A little larger than cocktail pasties common to the UK, the Mexican-made versions are widely varied including: meat and potato, black bean, shredded chicken, and sausage, all heavily laced with chillies plus a range of sweet pasties including: pineapple, apple, strawberry, and blackberry. A number have developed into national chains with shops in towns and cities across Mexico. The town of Real del Monte is the site of a museum of Cornish pasties, opened in 2011.

International Pasty Festival

In October 2009 the town of Real del Monte (twinned with Redruth, Cornwall) held the first International Pasty Festival (Festival Internacional del Paste). Organised by the Municipality of Real del Monte, the paste producers and the Cornish Mexican Cultural Society Chapter Mexico, the Festival was a great success drawing an estimated 8,000 visitors to the town for the three-day event. A coach of visitors travelled from Cuernavaca, some four hours away, and another from Mexico City. The Festival was opened by the President Municipal of Real del Monte, Ing. Omar Mariano Skewes. During the opening speeches it was stated that "Cornish people rebuilt our shattered mining industry giving us work and now again, when we have lost that industry, the Cornish have given us pastes and a new source of income."

As is usual on festival days in this town, the programme commenced with a visit to the Cornish Cemetery and a guided tour by Bridget Galsworthy of the British Society, followed by wreath-laying at the Miner's Monument. The main street was transformed with a long line of tented stands where 'pastes' of all descriptions were produced and a large stage next to the Miners' Memorial provided dance and other entertainments throughout the Festival.

== Notable people ==
At the end of the 19th century, the engineer Andrés Aldasoro worked in the Las Dos Estrellas Mine. Two of his sons, Juan Pablo Aldasoro and Eduardo Aldasoro Suárez, were born in Mineral del Monte. As adults, they became pioneers in aviation, and both became members of the Early Birds of Aviation. Alfred C. Crowle was the Cornish born miner who emigrated to Mexico and in 1935 became manager to the national Mexican football team.

John Edgar Benjamin Vial was a Cornish-Mexican who fought in the British Imperial Forces during World War I. He died in the Battle of Somme. For his service he received the British War Medal and the Victory Medal. There is a monument in his honor at the Panteon Inglés.

== Demographics ==
According to the 2020 census by INEGI, the town had a population of 11,149 which accounted for 77.83% of the municipality's inhabitants. There were 5255 men and 5894 women: a ratio of 89.16 men per 100 women. There were 2499 privately owned homes.

In terms of language and ethnicity; only 38 spoke an indigenous language (0.34%). 1.17% (130 people) were afro-Mexican. Catholicism was by far the most common religion with 9579 declarations (85.91%), but 813 were Protestant (7.29%; possibly Cornish Methodist) and 15 declared other religions. 730 declared no religion.

== Mines ==
Silver Mines in the municipalities of Mineral del Monte, Mineral de la Reforma and Pachuca

All mines in the municipality extracted silver ore which was then dressed using the patio process. The mines were originally worked by indigenous Otomini later by the Spanish from the 16th to 19th centuries. From 1824many of the mines became British interests operated by the Real del Monte Company until 1849 after a loss of $5,079,283; these were soon renationalised an in turn became worked by American companies in the 20th century. The last mine to operate was Mina San José La Rica which closed in 2005.

- Dolores Mine (20.134997°N 98.669630°W)
- Acosta Mine (20.146603°N 98.667911°W)
- Purísima Concepción Mine (20.144638°N 98.678890°W)
- San José La Rica Mine (20.138669°N 98.681499°W)
- La Dificultad Mine (20.145567°N 98.672213°W)
- Cabrera Mine

=== Engine Houses ===
The municipality is home to two surviving engine houses: at Dolores Mine and Acosta Mine. Several, no longer extant, are known to have existed.

== Gallery ==
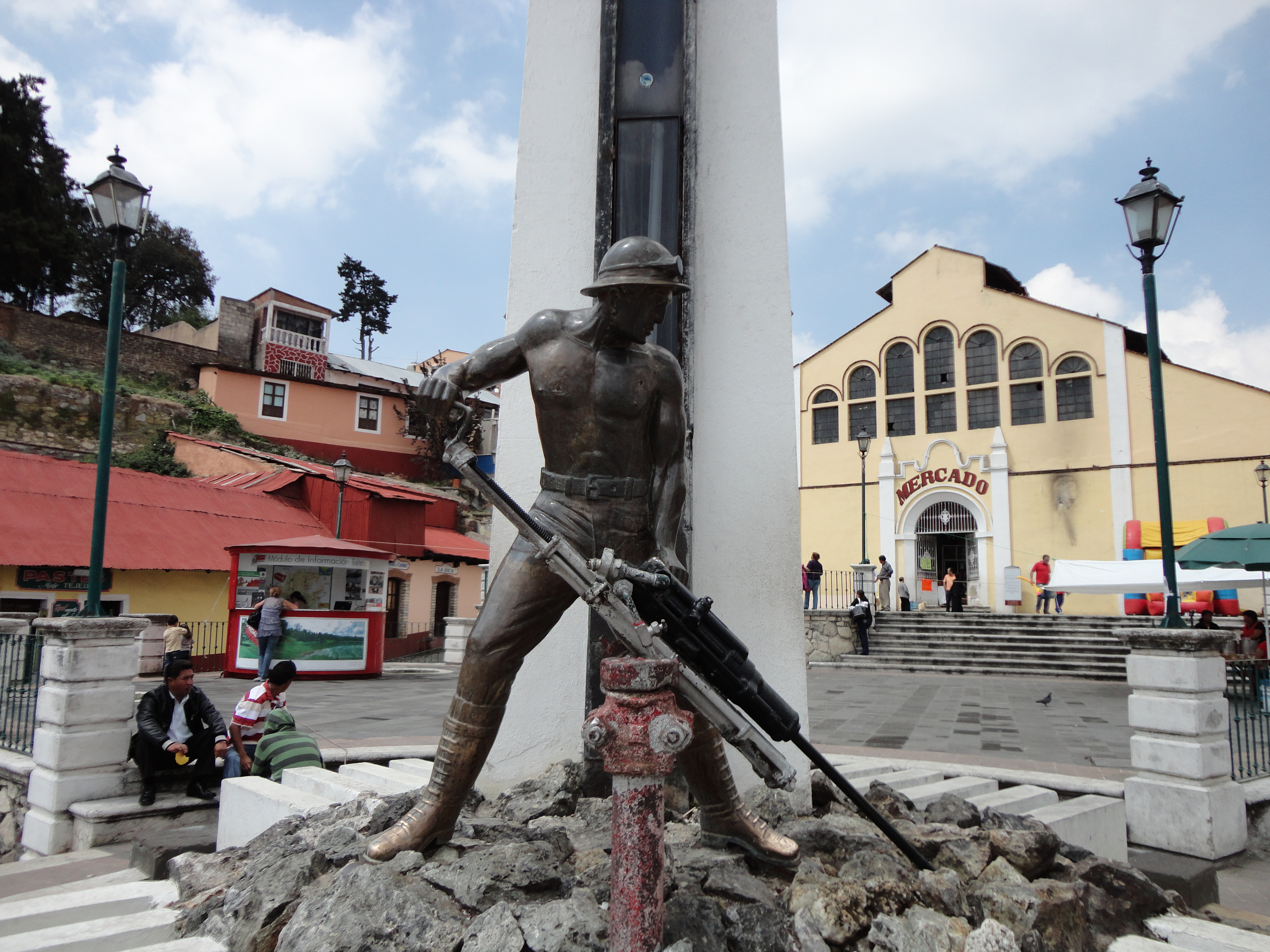
Monument to the Miner

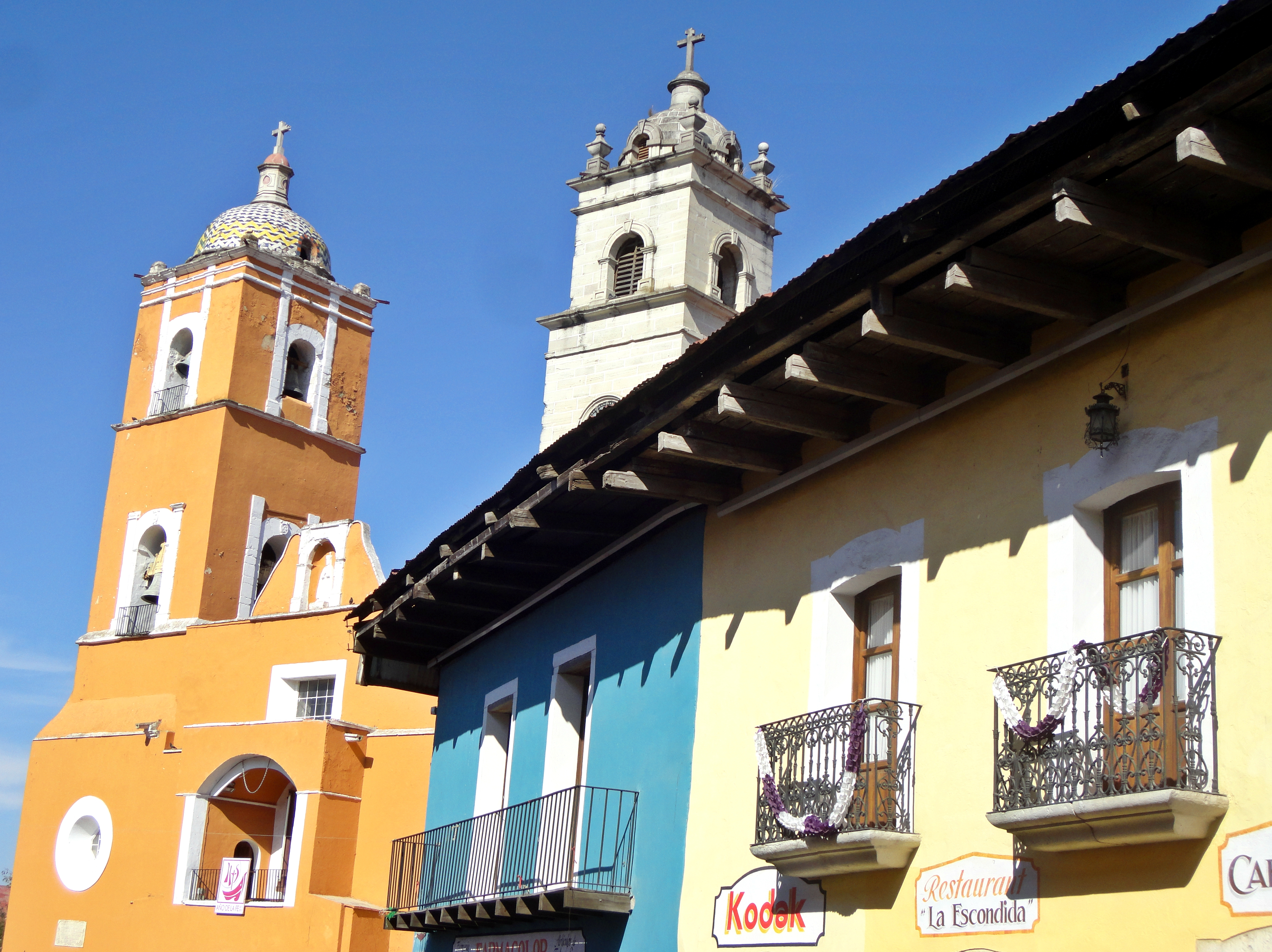
Parish church of Nuestra Señora del Rosario (Our Lady of the Rosary)

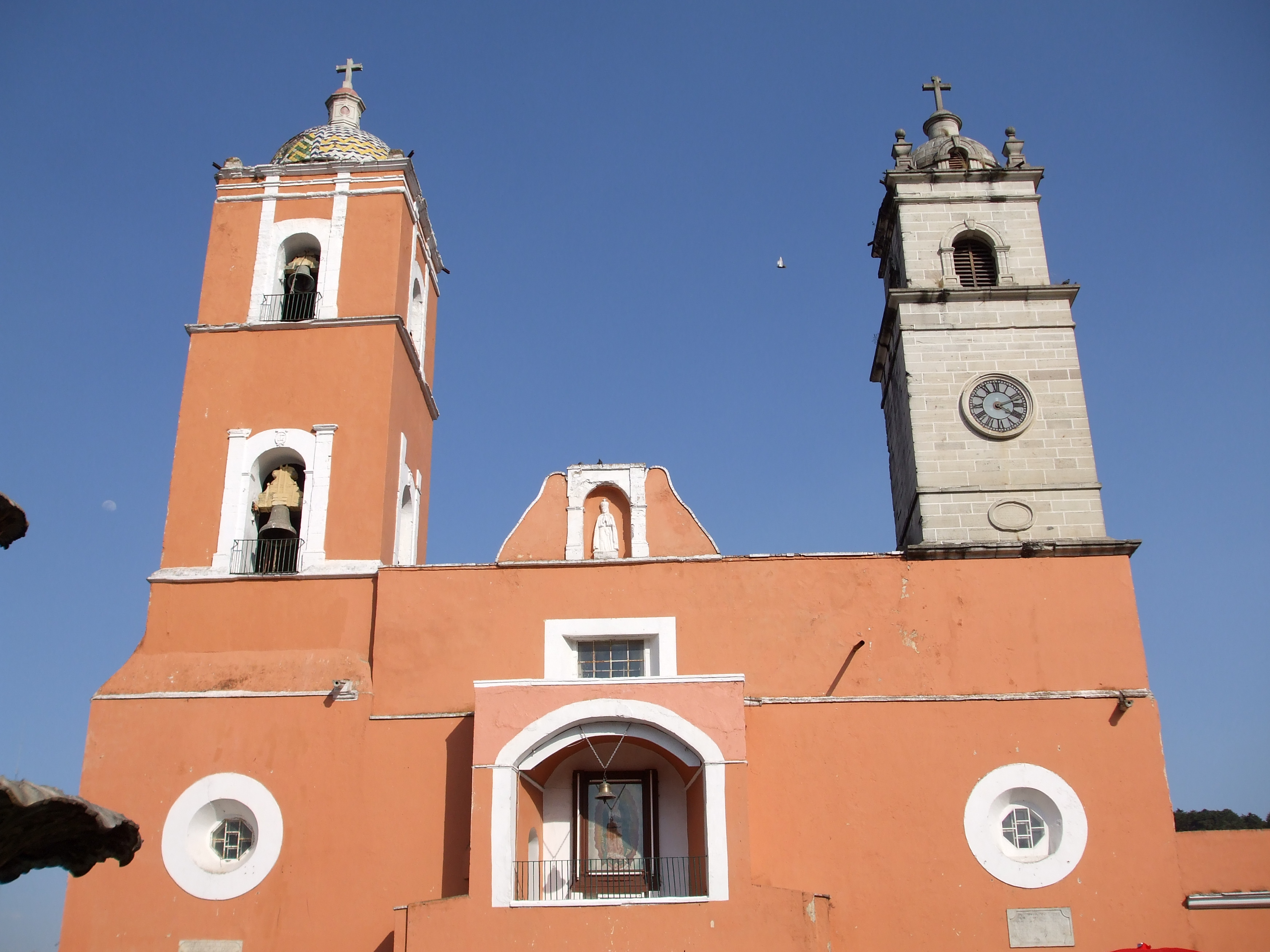
Church's two towers, one in Spanish style, other in "English" style

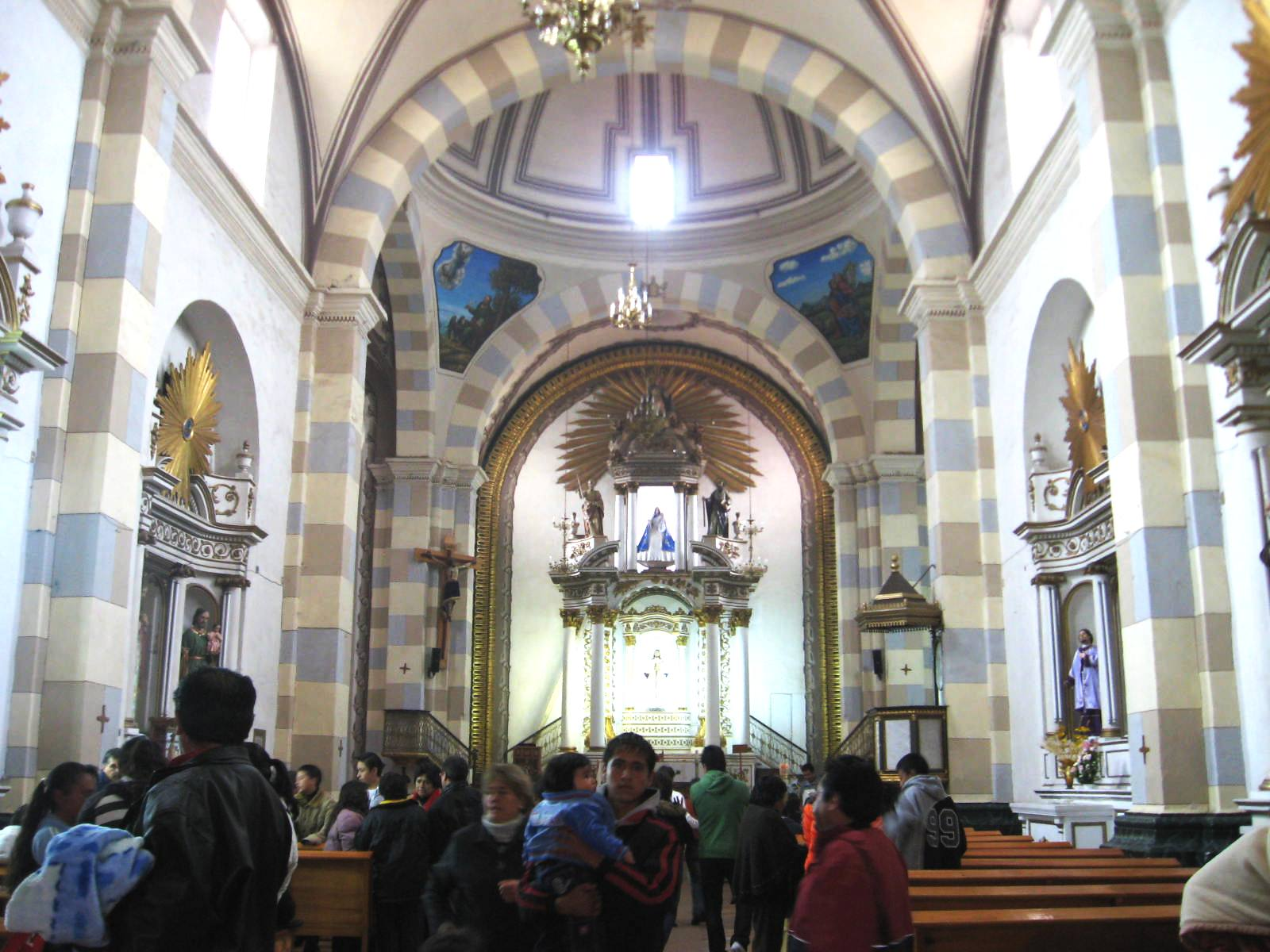
Interior of Nuestra Señora del Rosario.

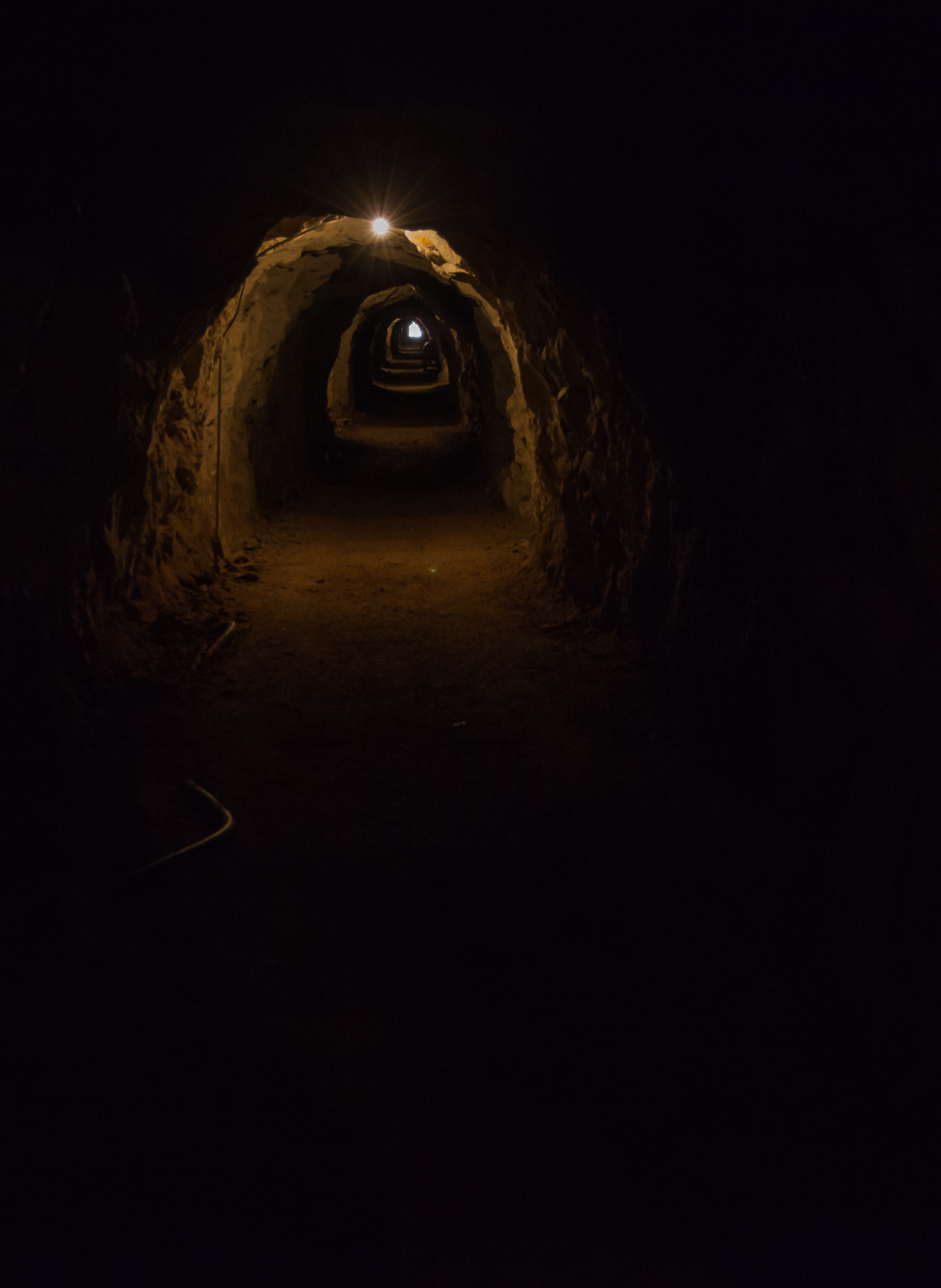
Channel within the Acosta Mine

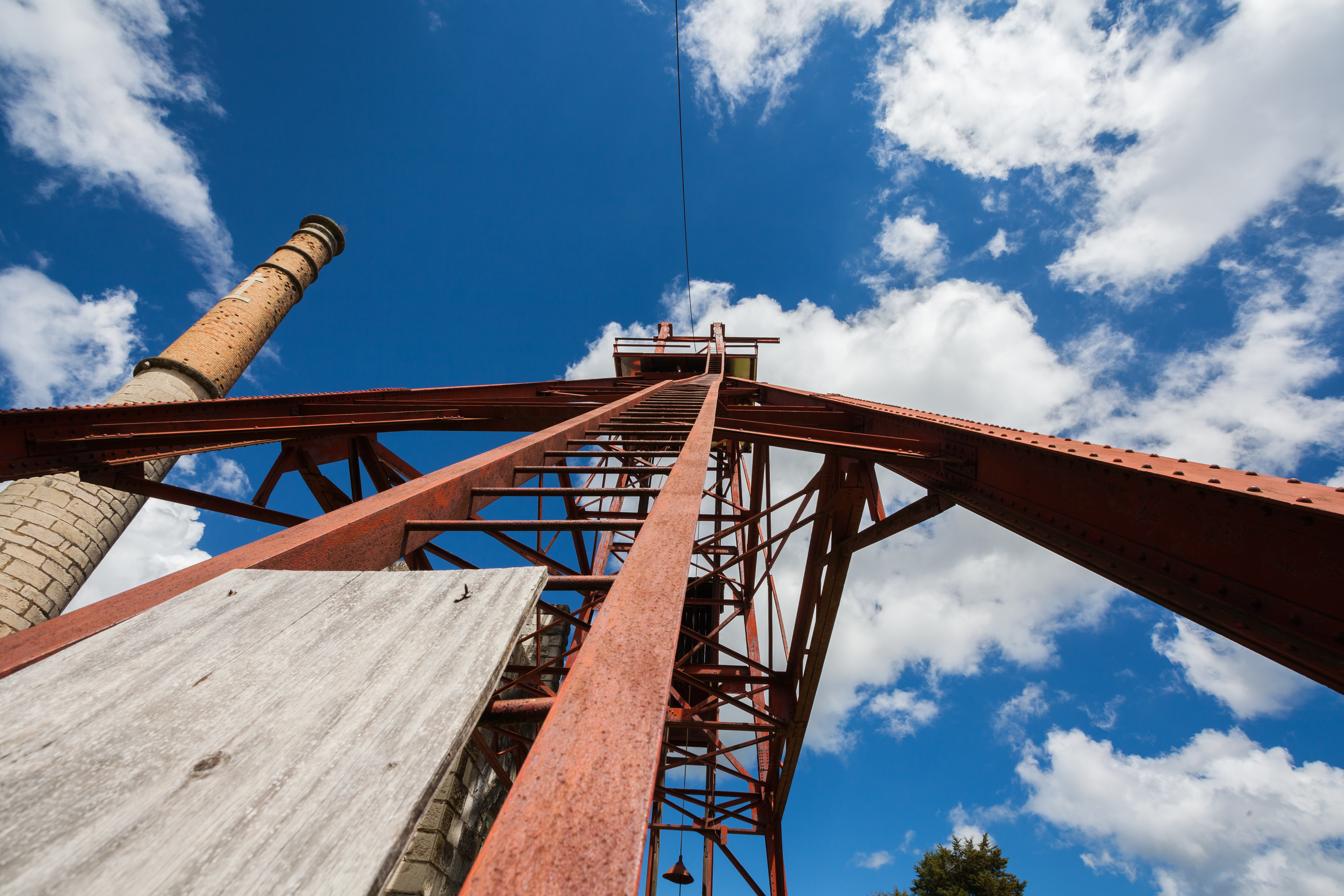
Mine Hoist and Headframe from the Acosta Mine

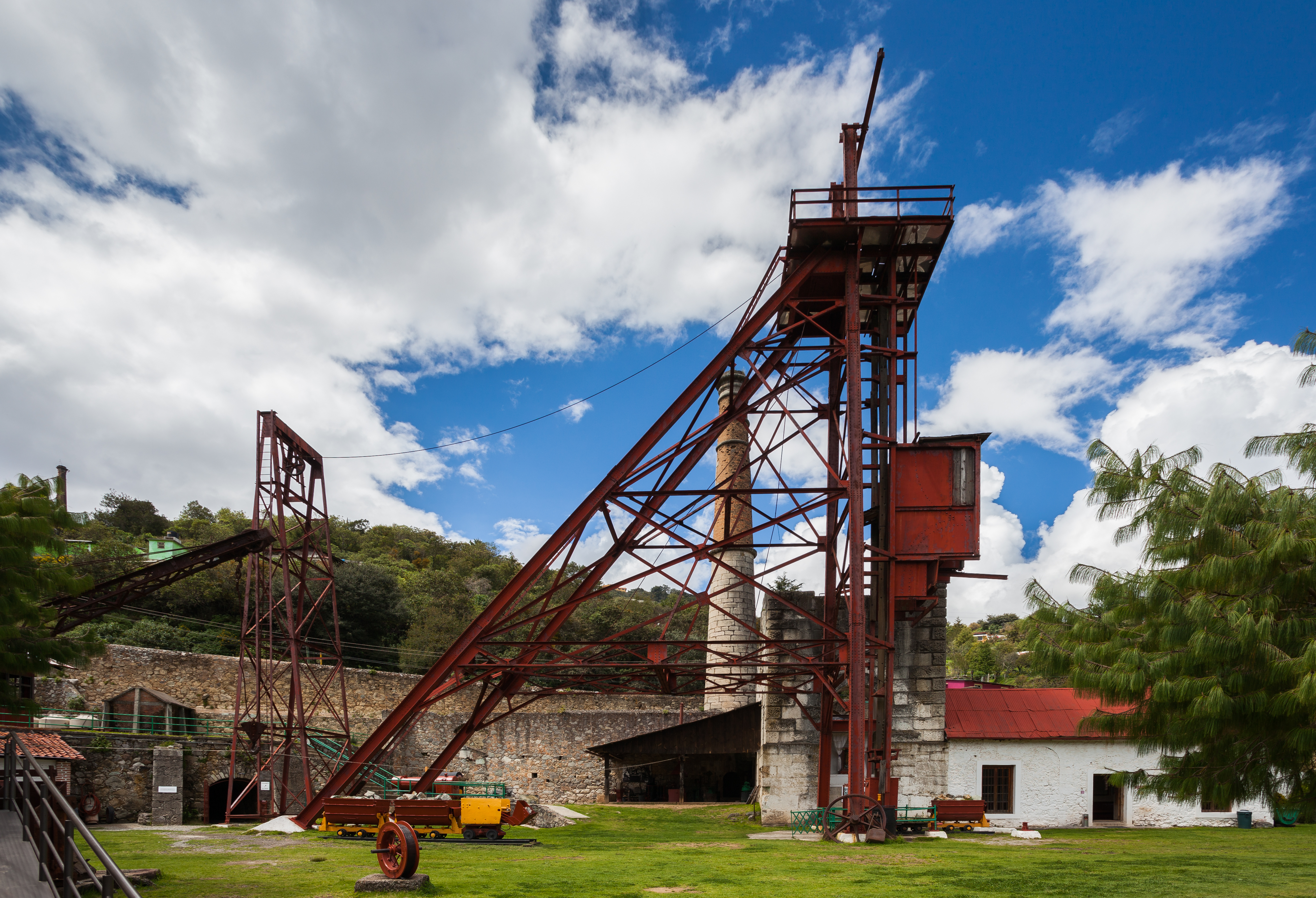
Acosta Mine

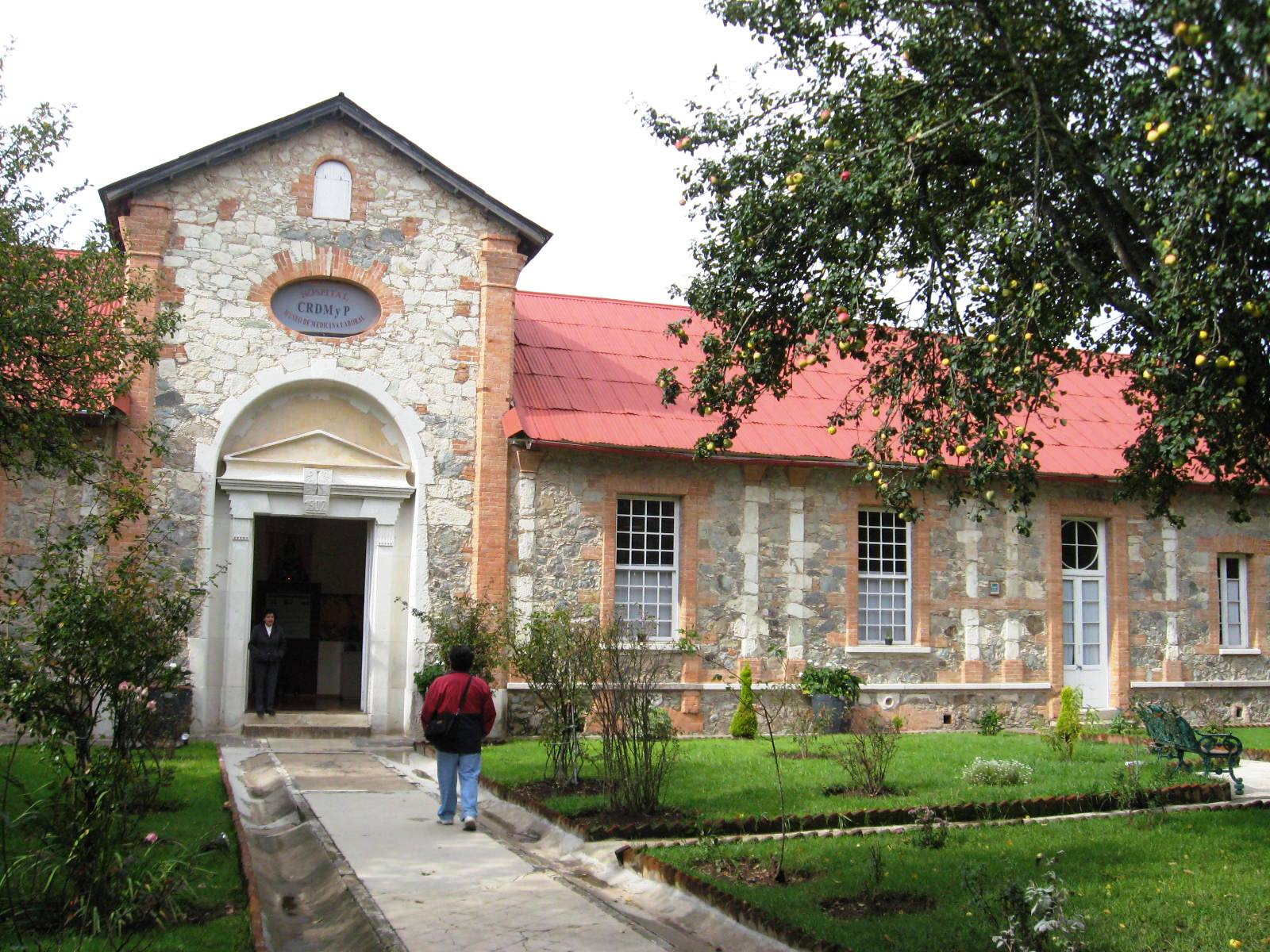
The former miners' hospital, now the Museo de Medicina Laboral (Museum of Occupational Medicine)

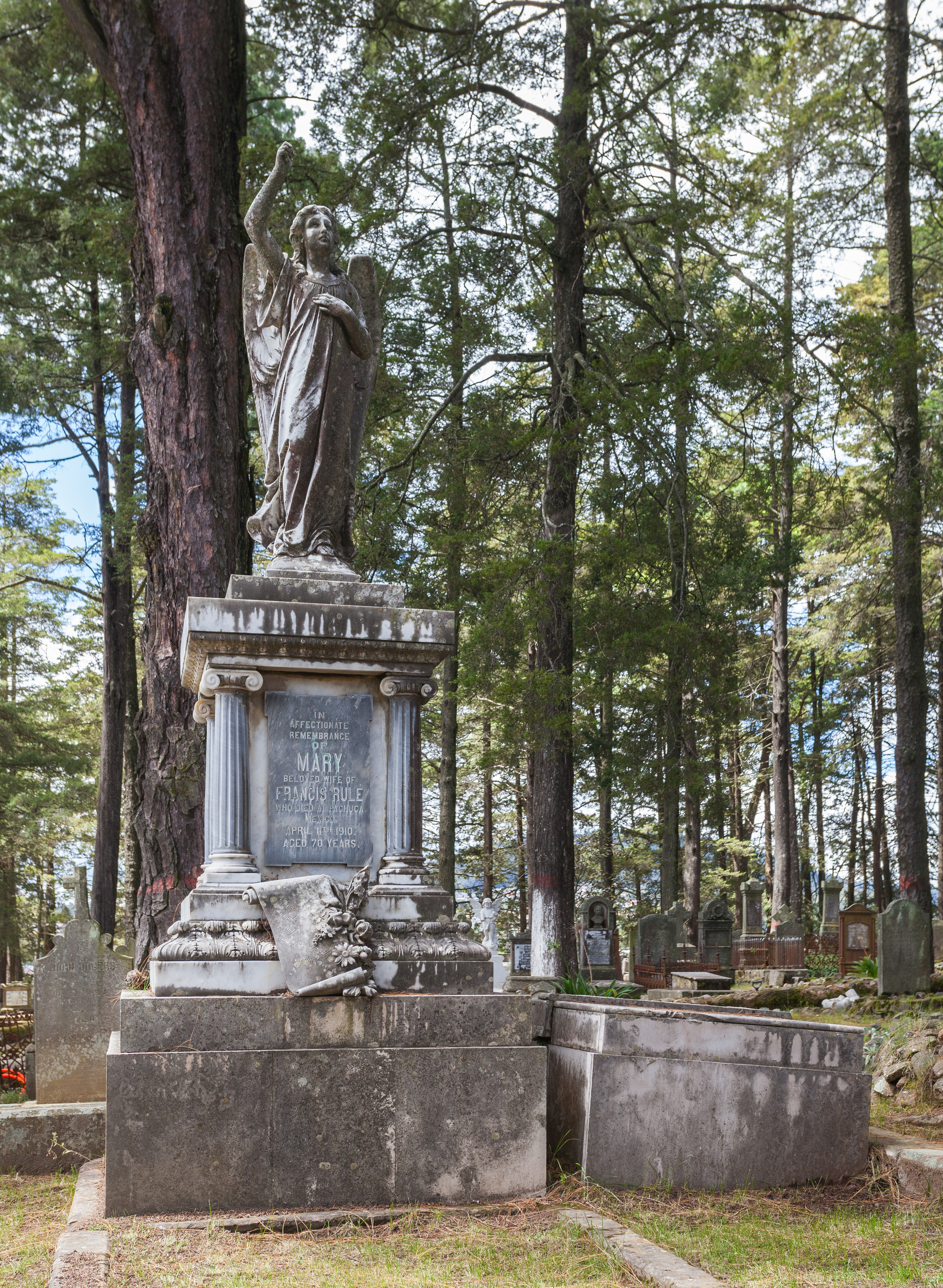
Panteon Inglés (English Cemetery)

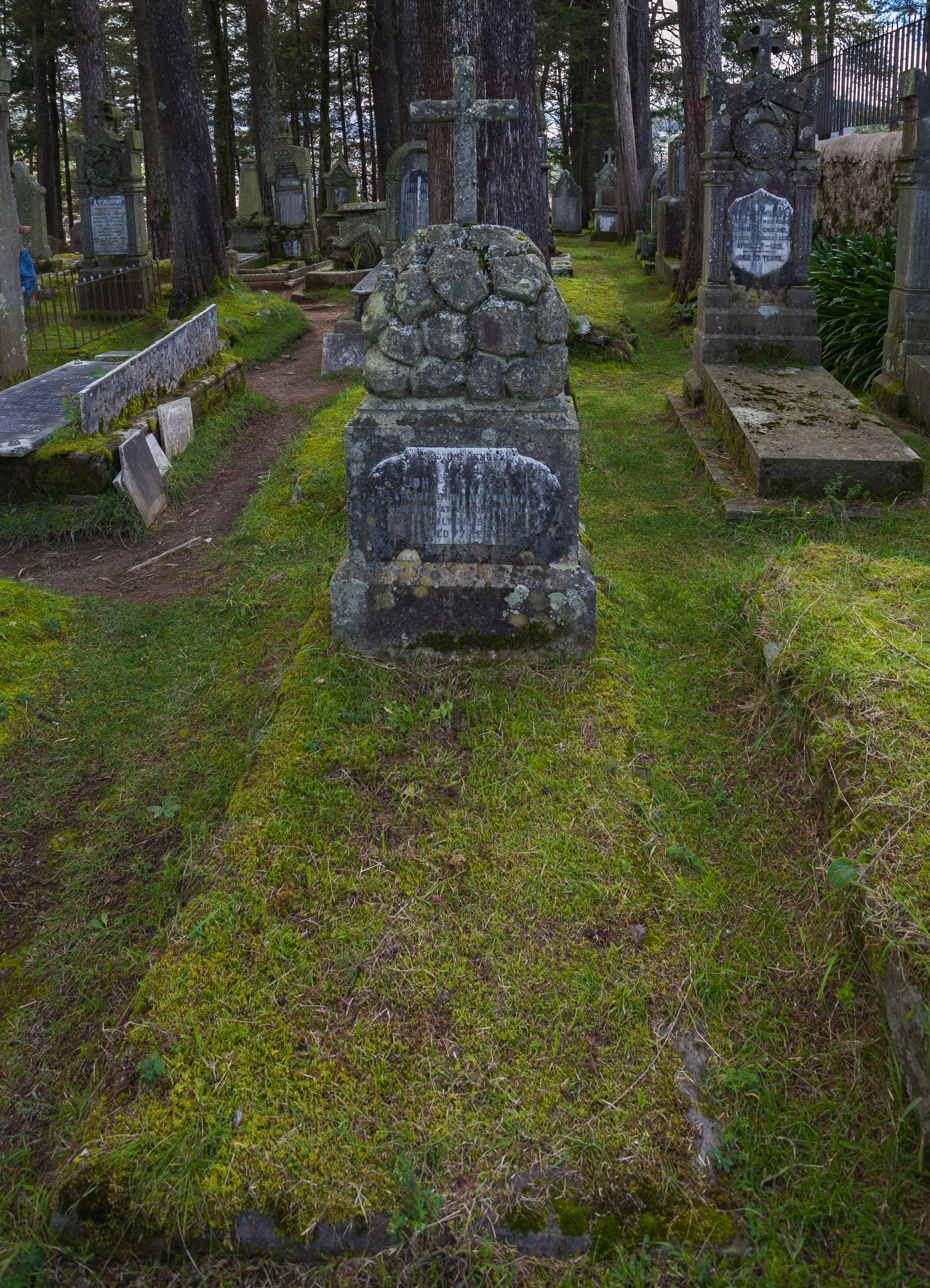
Panteon Inglés
