= 1766–1773 Real del Monte strike =

1766 labor unrest in New Spain

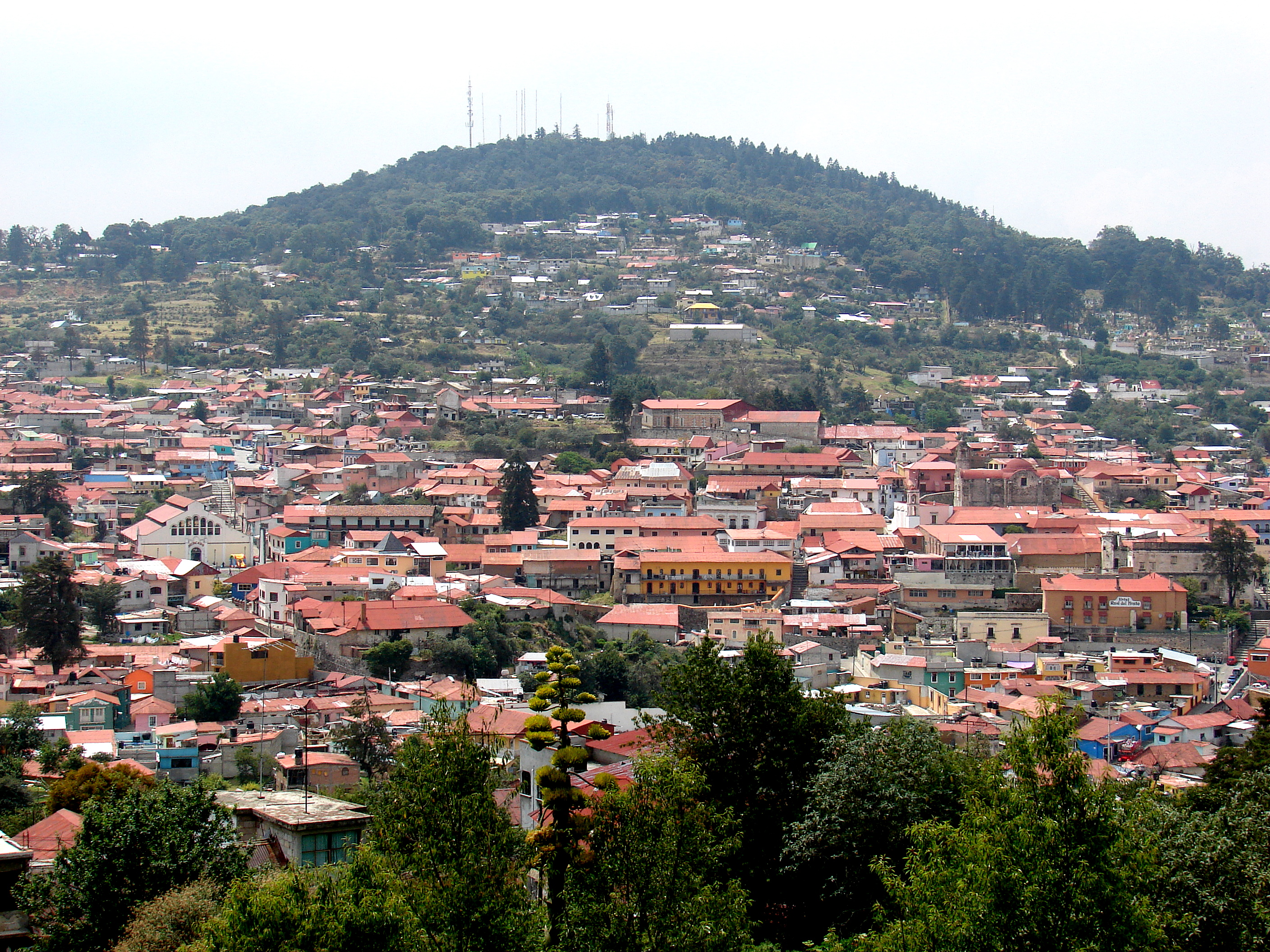
- Real del Monte (now Mineral del Monte), where the strike took place, in 2008
- Date: July 28, 1766 – February 1767
- Location: Pachuca and Real del Monte, New Spain (now in Hidalgo, Mexico)
- Caused by: Pay cuts to miners; Reduction of the partido; Abuse of workers
- Result: Strike crushed

Parties
Miners	New Spain

Lead figures
Jose Vicente de Villanueva; Jose Manuel; Jose Hesabino; Jose Anton Osorino	Pedro Romero de Terreros

The 1766 Real del Monte strike or 1766 miners' strike occurred when silver miners in Real del Monte and Pachuca, in the province of New Spain, went on strike for better working conditions, after Pedro Romero de Terreros abolished the workers' party, reduced wages from 4 reales to 3 reales, and increased the workload to gain more profits. The miners protested as a result, and expressed their discontent to the authorities in Pachuca, but they did nothing to resolve it and told them to speak to the viceroy Joaquín Juan de Montserrat y Cruïlles. This statement led to violent conflicts on August 15, 1766.

Real del Monte was a prosperous mining city under the Spanish crown, located in east-central Mexico—today a municipality in the state of Hidalgo. The mines were owned and controlled by Pedro Romero de Terreros, Count of Regla from 1735 until Mexican independence from Spain in 1821. He is considered by many to be one of the richest and most powerful Spaniards in the colonies at the time of the strike, and is noted for his incredible business skill in restoring his bankrupt uncle's estate to one of the most prosperous silver producing regions in the whole of Spanish America. The strike in 1766 though, in which miners protested changes in labor and wage practices under Terreros, is considered by many to be the first real labor strike in North American history, as it was not only a work stoppage, which had occurred in many places before, but an organized attempt at renegotiating labor contracts and conditions.

== Background ==
The Viceroyalty of New Spain was created after Hernán Cortés's conquest of the Aztec Empire in 1521. From the end of the 17th century through the beginning of the 19th, over fifty thousand tons of silver were exported from Spanish mines in the Americas to Europe and beyond. The mining town of Real del Monte was settled in the late 16th century, but did not obtain its later status as a mining hub until the arrival of Pedro Romero de Terreros, Count of Regla. Real del Monte mines are estimated to have produced more than one billion troy ounces of silver since the 16th century, the majority of which was produced under the direction of the Spanish crown. In addition to silver, the mines at Real del Monte and Pachuca contained lead, zinc, copper and gold.

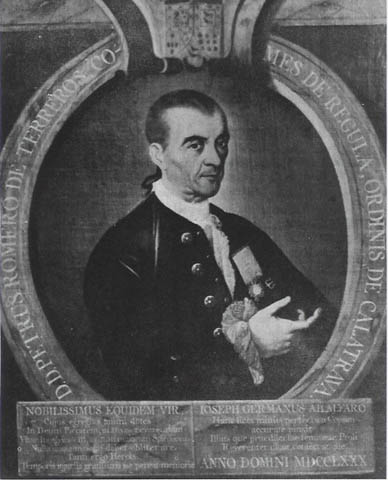
Pedro Romero de Terreros, Count of Regla, was responsible for the growth of mining in Real del Monte

Due in large part to the prosperous silver mines, New Spain generated the most income for the Spanish crown of all the colonial holdings. Mines in Mexico were the most profitable in large part because government expenditures were less compared to that of the mines in Peru and other colonies. This was for two reasons: one, that higher-grade mercury was accessible and therefore implemented in Mexican mines and not Peruvian ones, and two, the Spanish Crown granted Mexican mines a special concession in 1548, lowering the royalty percentage they were required to pay. Because of this, mine owners and overseers in Mexico, such as de Terreros, became much more independently wealthy, and more politically powerful, than their Peruvian counterparts.

The mines at Real del Monte are an example of the diverse specialization within the silver industry, as Real del Monte had thirty different specialized tasks carried out by different skilled laborers. Real del Monte was ethnically diverse, with whites, mestizos, and indigenous peoples working alongside one another. By 1766, one hundred and thirty three black slaves also worked in the mines—a much larger number than the average among the mines of New Spain. Indigenous peoples were subjected to slavery there for many years, even after mandates attempted to limit forced labor in favor of the reductions organized by Jesuits and Franciscans.

The workers within Real del Monte were divided into barras, work gangs of five or six men. The majority worked in the trenches and were tasked with filling a roughly one hundred pound bag each twelve-hour shift and carrying it up 1800 notched steps steeply built into the side of the mine. Workers were paid in cash as well as partidos, half of the higher-grade silver ore they mined each day outside of the quota bag. Many workers reported serious ailments and injuries resulting from working in the mines, specifically heart and lung trouble. The most cited issue was "excessive toil and fatigue". Doris M. Ladd, in her analysis of the working conditions during this period, states that the continued danger workers faced was their primary bargaining ground for demanding fair wages.

=== The mines of Pachuca and Real del Monte ===
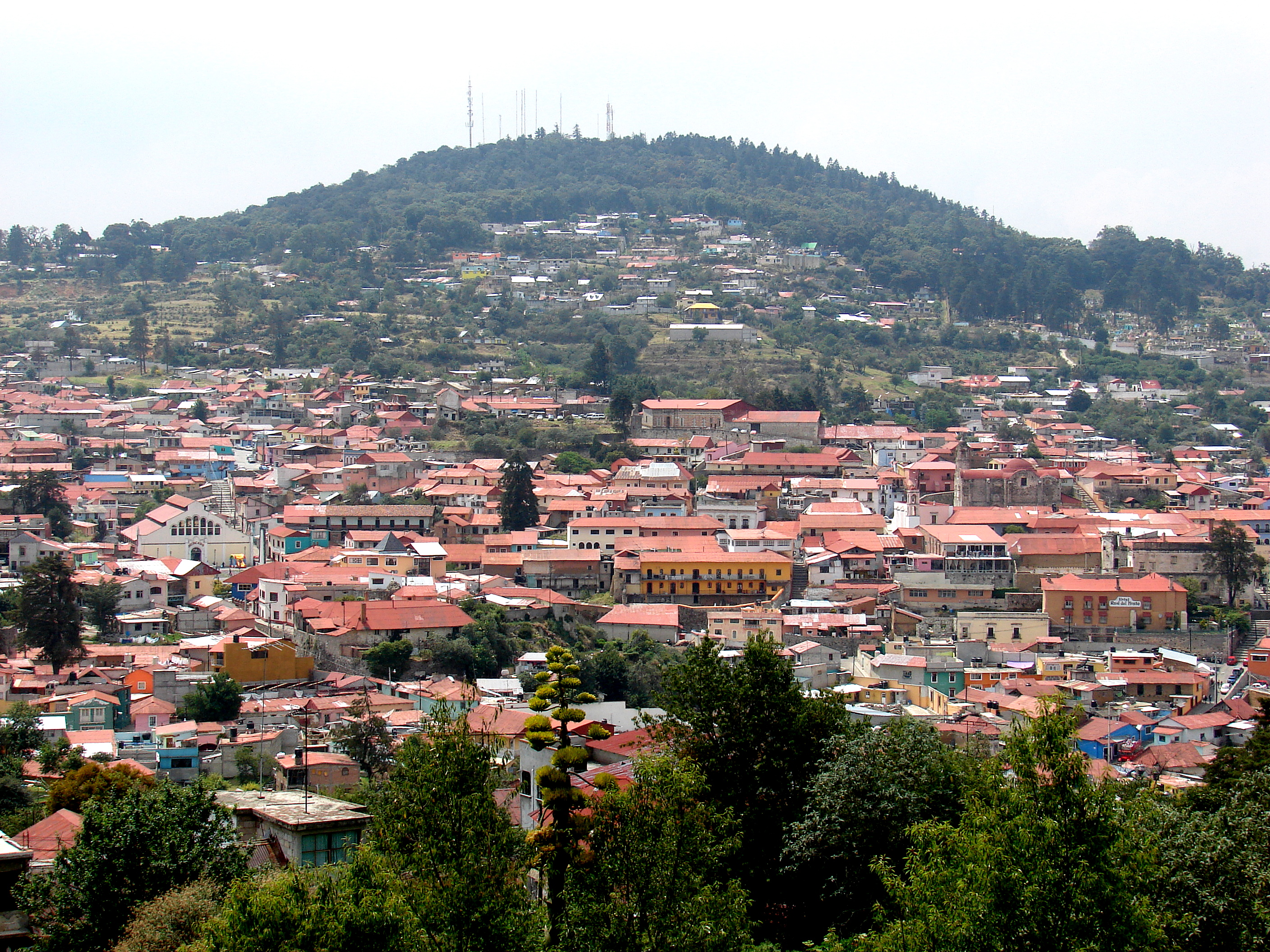
View of Real del Monte

Located in the north of the Gulf of Mexico, its mines contained silver, lead, zinc, copper, and gold. The district was divided into two parts, Pachuca and Real del Monte.

Due to its proximity to Mexico City, it received special interest in the search for precious metals. Thus, it became the closest mine to the capital that produced silver, facilitating its exploitation.

European discovery of the mines was made on April 25, 1552 by Alonso Rodriguez de Salgado. Between 1544 and 1555, after many attempts, Bartolome Medina found a way to extract silver. From that moment on, many workers moved there.

At the beginning of the 18th century, most of the local mines were flooded, and operations were halted. The towns became depopulated, and workers migrated to other mining areas. Jose Alejandro Bustamante and Bustillo and Pedro Romero de Terreros signed a contract to collaborate in draining the mines. As a result, the minerals of Real del Monte could be exploited again, and consequently, the Pachuca district ranked fourth in New Spain in silver production. This made De Terreros the richest man in New Spain.

The Pachuca district was the fourth largest in New Spain in terms of silver production, behind Guanajuato, Real de Catorce, and Zacatecas. Pedro Romero de Terreros was the wealthiest person in New Spain.

== Strike ==
=== Pay changes ===
In 1765, the Count of Regla suffered economic losses after attempting to drain the water and rehabilitate mines in Veta Vizcaina after severe flooding. Ultimately unsuccessful and costing him over one hundred thousand pesos, he aimed to make up the loss through cost-cutting measures in the other mines. His first reform, enacted in June 1765, was the cutting of all workers' wages to slave wage level. As to be expected, this sparked initial outrage amongst the workers.

Other reforms introduced throughout the rest of the year were taken more gradually. Workers claimed the daily quota sack size gradually increased before finally reaching double its initial size, making it near impossible to fill in a standard twelve-hour shift. Larger, and therefore heavier, sacks also made the trek up from the bottom of the mine more dangerous. The count also began changing the partido system. The partido bags the workers split with management and then were allowed to take home had always contained higher-quality ore than the quota bags, and the count now decided half of the workers' share would now be exchanged with half of the quota share. By the end of the year, not only had the workers' standard wages been cut, but their job was also made more dangerous by the increased quota bag size and their partido shares—a form of "bonus" yet necessary to their livelihood—reduced to a much lower quality ore.

=== First grievance ===
By 1766, workers had begun holding secret meetings under the advisement of a local priest. The first grievance was drafted, signed by fifteen mine workers, "affirmed" by fifty more, and presented to the management on July 28. In it, the laborers stated that "today all is done to profit the boss and make the workers perish". That night, some of the men who signed were then forced to work an extra night shift and harshly punished by the administrators for their involvement. The following day, 250 workers and their family members marched to the treasury office in Pachuca to demand that their allegations be investigated. Royal officials promised to visit Real del Monte on July 30, and were accompanied by the striking workers up to the mines. There they witnessed the mixing of the partido and quota bags to be distributed to the few miners who were working, yet did not order the managers or overseers to change anything, and simply ordered the workers to return to the mines.

=== Later grievances ===
On August 1, four of the leaders and organizers within the mines, Jose Vicente de Villanueva, Jose Manuel, Jose Hesabino, and Jose Anton Osorino, hired lawyer Manuel Cordero to assist them in drafting a second grievance to be sent to the viceroy. The August 1 grievance, which represented 1200 workers, went beyond the complaints in the July 28 petition to invoke larger allegations of tyranny and abuse by the Count of Regla and other administrators in the mines. Due in large part to Cordero's writing skills, the petition invoked international labor rhetoric, not just specific complaints made by individual workers. This petition in particular makes the strike stand out from previous work stoppages and other grievances in mines and other industries in years previous to Real del Monte.

The Royal authorities ordered the workers to return to work in the mines, but also sent instructions for partido payment to be raised to two-thirds mixing (in which workers' partido bags would contain two-thirds high quality ore and one-third lower quality quota bag ore) instead of half and half. Workers returned to Real del Monte with this very slight victory, still upset that the authorities had ignored the majority of their demands. On August 8, authorities imprisoned three of the organizers, Gonzales, Barron, and Oviedos, and proclaimed that they would be held until the end of the strike. Thousands of workers then mobilized to support their colleagues held hostage, and one experienced pikeman entered into negotiations with the Count. De Torreros agreed to return to equal partido division. The two did not discuss the cut in peon wages though, which, even as the majority of workers returned to the mines the following day, continued to fuel anger among the workers.

=== Violence ===
On August 15, 1766, the strike turned violent as workers stoned a district magistrate, Miguel Ramon de Coca, and the overseer of the La Joya mine, Manuel Barbosa, to death after pay had been doled out. For most workers, wages and partidos were paid in full by the overseers, but known strike leaders, including those who had been held hostage a week earlier, were forced to mix their partidos with quota bags and therefore receive the same, lower grade partido they had been striking against. A local priest attempted to quell the angry workers and give them a lunch break, but that afternoon the anger boiled over.

Violence began at the San Cayetano mine as a mob of workers interrupted a meeting between Pedro Romero de Terreros and Miguel Ramon de Coca. While de Terreros was able to escape the building unscathed, de Coca was not, and the mob began hurling stones at him and charging at him. Other overseers in the mines pulled him away from the crowd, but he sustained a crushed skull and multiple other injuries, which led to his death two days later.

After the first stoning of de Coca, the mob moved up the hill to La Joya and began shouting demands and rushing towards Barbosa. Barbosa pulled a knife and the crowd began to throw rocks, eventually stabbing him multiple times with his own knife and then continuing to stone him to death. After this, a group of three or four hundred moved down the hill and freed twelve prisoners from the Real del Monte jail, and then moved to the Pachuca jail to free the four miners being held by Royal officials. The workers refused to leave until all of the other prisoners had been set free. With the entire town in complete mayhem at this point, many of the miners took to the streets chanting "Long live the king, death to bad management!" a phrase that would come to be used multiple times over throughout the course of independence movements in Latin America. While the rioters and strikers did go home the night of August 15 for a rather peaceful night, Pedro Romero de Terreros fled the region and began his exile in San Miguel.

The following day, over three hundred armed men from around Mexico, under direction of the viceroy, arrived in Real del Monte. The viceroy published his response, stating that the troops were not there to harm the workers, but strikers had twenty-four hours to return to work cooperatively. It was also at this point that the Royal Arbitrator Francisco de Gamboa, "New Spain's most experienced mining expert", was called by the viceroy to Real del Monte to help remedy the situation. With goals of "social order and full work crews," Gamboa began interviewing almost every worker, supervisor, and foremen at the mines while simultaneously increasing the visibility of the soldiers around the mines. After multiple days of testimonials, he drew up the plans for ordinances to be published with clear guidelines for partido mixing that had been judged fair by both workers and management. In Gamboa's plan, the overseers would appoint a captain, one of the miners, to oversee the mixing, which would result in half high quality ore and half low quality ore for both workers and management. Gamboa though, wanted to jail the ringleaders of the strike with hopes that it would convince de Terreros to return from exile in San Miguel. The Viceroy did not agree with this, and had more sympathy for the plight of the workers than Gamboa. He advised against mass roundups, and urged Gamboa to address the injustices the workers had experienced under de Terreros.

Despite widespread agreement over the Gamboa Ordinances, peace did not come to the mines for another couple years. Workers continued to be upset with foremen's choices of captains to lead partido division; however, they followed the verbal guidelines outlined in Gamboa's Ordinances to express their grievances and get unpopular captains deposed from time to time. These disputes differed from the original complaints, as they were largely workers turning against other workers; a departure from the management-focused anger of the earlier half of the strike. Violence continued through the end of 1766, especially with worker-anger geared towards the more skilled mine workers who were perceived to work "easier" or "better" jobs, particularly the recogedores.

In the early part of 1767, turmoil in Real del Monte reached its height, with multiple days of riots throughout February. The authorities, however, were unable to discover any signs of conspiracy, or previous planning of the violence within the community. The few arrests that were made were based on hearsay or false evidence, but the February sweeps were the most far-reaching and resulted in the harshest sentences for many workers whose connection with organizing the strikes, or participating in the violence, was limited at best. These arrests marked the end of violence and striking in Real del Monte.

== Aftermath ==
By April 1767, the total Real del Monte workforce had been reduced by 70%, and 1767–1768 was called a "desert year," as silver production fell to less than what it was in a desert. After the tumultuous year of striking, silver production across the entire Pachuca area fell to less than half of what it had been in the early 1760s. Pedro Romero de Terreros emerged from his exile, and continued to direct the mines; however, silver production levels never reached that of the pre-strike years. In his later life, de Terreros's focus shifted towards more philanthropy, and less on his younger money-making years.

=== Post-independence ===
While mining practices shifted in the period after the strikes due to larger economic shifts across the entire Spanish Empire, mining slowed down in the second half of the nineteenth century. Silver production had peaked in the region during the years under de Terreros's control, although after independence from Spain in 1821, a public, British-directed Real del Monte Company controlled the mines of Real del Monte. The company began under Colonel Murphy from Liverpool, who gained power of attorney from de Torreros, himself to take over contracts to run the mines after the Spanish had left Mexico (Letter to John Taylor 7). In many ways, the Cornish influence came to replace the Spanish influence in the two despite not formally colonizing it.

Today, Real del Monte is a declared "Pueblo Magico" by the Mexican government for its historical significance as a mining hub and for its preserved, attractive downtown area which contains traces of both the Spanish influence and the Cornish presence. A couple of mines in the area continue to operate today, although most of the silver industry has died out. Every June, the town holds the Silver Festival (Spanish: El Festival de la Plata), a festival for silver artisans to display and sell their work. They also hold the "Day of the Miner" celebrations on July 11, with events to commemorate the towns' labor history.
