= List of aircraft engine manufacturers =

This is a list of aircraft engine manufacturers both past and present.

== 0–9 ==
- 2si – US
- 3W

== A ==
- A.V. Roe
- Abadal
- ABC Motors — UK
- ABECO
- Aberg
- ABLE
- ACAE
- AC Company
- Accurate Automation Corp
- Adams
- Adams-Dorman
- Adams-Farwell
- Adept-Airmotive
- Adler
- Admiralty Rotary
- Adorjan & Dedics
- Advance Engines
- Advance Motor Manufacturing Company – UK
- Advanced Engine Design
- Aeolus Flugmotor
- Aerien CC
- Aermacchi
- Aero & Marine
- Aero Adventure
- Aero Bonner Ltd.
- Aero Conversions Inc.
- Aero Development
- Aero Engines Ltd.
- AIDC
- Aero Motion
- Aero Motors
- Aero Pixie
- Aero Prag
- Aero Sled
- Aero Sport International
- Aero Sport Power
- Aero Thrust
- Aero Turbines Ltd
- AeroTwin Motors Corporation
- AeroConversions
- Aerodaimler
- Aeroengine Corporation of China (AECC) — China
- Aerojet — US
- Aeromarine Company
- Aeromarine — US
- Aeromax
- Aeromotion
- Aeronamic
- Aeronautical Products Corporation
- Aeronca — US
- Aeronco
- Aeroplane Motors Company
- Aeroprotech
- Aerosila — Russia
- Aerosport – US
- Aerostar – Romania
- Aerosud-Marvol
- Aerotech-PL
- Aerotechnik
- Aerotek – US
- Aerotwin
- Aerovee
- AFECO
- Affordable Turbine Power
- AFR
- Agilis
- Agusta – Italy
- Ahrbecker Son and Hankers
- Aichi Kokuki – Japan
- AICTA Design Work
- Aiello
- Air Cooled Motors – US
- Air Repair Incorporated
- Air Ryder
- Air Technical Arsenal
- Airtrike
- Air-Craft Engine Corp
- Aircat
- Aircraft & Ind. Motor Corp.
- ACT
- AEADC
- Airculture
- Airdelta
- Airdisco — UK
- AiResearch
- Airex
- Airmotive-Perito
- Airship
- Airways Mfg.
- Aeronáutica Industrial S.A.
- Aixro
- Ajax
- Akkerman
- Akron
- AKSAI
- Albatross
- Aldasoro
- Alexander (engine manufacturer)
- Alfa Romeo — Italy
- Alfaro
- ABEC
- Allen Aircraft Engine Co — US
- Alliance Aircraft Corp
- Allied Aviation Corp
- AlliedSignal — US
- Allis-Chalmers
- Allison Engine Company — US
- Alvis — UK
- ACE
- AEC
- American Helicopter
- American
- Angle
- Antoinette — France
- Anzani
- Ardem
- Argus Motoren — Germany
- Armstrong Siddeley — UK
- Arrow Aircraft and Motors
- Arrow SNC — Italy
- Arsenal
- Ashmusen
- Aspin
- Aster
- Astra Avioane Arad – Romania
- Atwood
- Aubier & Dunne
- Austro Engine — Austria
- Austro-Daimler — Austria
- Avia Narodny Podnik
- Avia — Czechoslovakia
- Aviadvigatel – Russia
- Avio – Italy
- Avro Canada
- Avro
- Axelson
- Axial Vector Engine Corporation (Dyna-Cam)

== B ==
- Basse und Selve
- Bates
- Beardmore
- Beardmore-Halford-Pullinger (B.H.P.)
- Beatty
- Bailey Aviation
- Bentley
- Benz
- Berliner
- Besler Brothers
- Blackburn
- Blackburne
- BMW
- Boeing
- Borzecki
- Botali
- Bramo
- Brandner
- Breguet-Bugatti
- Breitfeld & Danek
- Breuer
- King
- Briggs & Stratton
- Bristol Siddeley
- Bristol
- British Salmson
- Brouhot
- Buchet
- Bücker
- Bugatti
- Burlat

== C ==
- C.L.M.
- Construcciones Aeronáuticas SA – Spain
- Campini
- CANSA
- Carden Aero Engines — UK
- Caunter
- Ceskoslovenska Zbrojovka
- CFM International — US and France
- Chamberlin
- Charomskiy
- Chelomey
- Chevrolet — US
- Chotia
- Chrysler — US
- Cicaré Aeronáutica
- Cieslak
- Cirrus — UK
- Cisco Motors
- Ader
- Clément-Bayard
- Clerget-Blin — France
- Coatalen
- Colombo
- Comet
- Commonwealth Aircraft Corporation — Australia
- Compact Radial Engines – Canada
- CNA – Italy
- Conrad
- Continental
- Cosmos Engineering Company
- Coventry Victor — UK
- Crankless Engines Company
- Curtiss Aeroplane and Motor Company — US
- Curtiss-Wright — US
- Cuyuna Development Company — US

== D ==
- D-Motor – Belgium
- D. W. Onan — US
- Deschamps
- Daimler-Benz
- Darraq
- de Havilland — UK
- de Laval
- Deicke
- Delafontaine
- DeltaHawk — US
- Aeromotor
- Diesel Air
- Doble-Besler
- Dobrynin
- Dongan Engine Manufacturing Company – China
- Douglas
- Douglas — UK
- Dreher
- Duesenberg
- Duthiel-Chambers
- Dux
- Dyna-Cam

== E ==
- EADS — Europe
- Easton
- Ecofly
- Eggenfellner Aircraft
- Electravia
- Electric Aircraft Corporation
- Elektromechanische Werke
- Elizalde — Spain
- EMG
- Emrax
- Engine Alliance — US
- E.N.V.
- Eurojet
- Europrop

== F ==
- F&S
- Ranger — US
- Fairdiesel
- Fairey
- Farcot
- Farina
- Farman Aviation Works — France
- Fiat — Italy
- Firewall Forward Aero Engines
- Flader
- Fletcher
- FN Division Moteurs — Belgium
- Ford Motor Company — US
- Ford of Britain — UK
- Franklin Engine Company — US

== G ==
- Garrett AiResearch — US
- Garuff
- Gas Turbine Research Establishment — India
- GE Honda Aero Engines — US
- GE Aerospace — US
- GE Aviation Czech — Czech Republic
- General — US
- General Aircraft Ltd.
- General Electric
- General Electric/Rolls-Royce
- General Motors — US
- Goebel
- Giannini
- Geiger Engineering
- GKN Aerospace — UK
- Glushenkov — Russia/Soviet Union
- Gnome et Rhône — France
- le Rhone — France
- Gobron-Brillié
- Great Plains Aircraft Supply Company
- Green — UK
- Grégoire
- Grizodubov
- Guiberson — US
- Gyro Motor Company

== H ==
- Hall-Scott
- Hall-Scott — US
- Hamilton Sundstrand
- Hart Engine Company
- Hartland Engine & Machine co
- Heath Aircraft Corp
- Heath-Henderson
- Heinkel-Hirth — Germany
- Walter — Germany
- Helwan
- Hendee
- Herman
- Hermes Engine Company
- Hewland
- Hexadyne
- Hiero Engines – Austria
- Higgs-Diesel
- Hiller Aircraft
- Hindustan Aeronautics — India
- Hiro
- Hirth — Germany
- Hispano-Suiza — France
- Hispano-Suiza — Spain
- Hitachi — Japan
- HKS – Japan
- Hofer
- Holbrook Aero Supply
- Honeywell — US
- Hopkins & de Kilduchevsky
- Hudson
- Hurricane Motors, Inc

== I ==
- I.Ae.
- Italian American Motor Engineering
- IHI
- Imperial Airplane Society
- Industria Aeronautică Română – Romania
- ITP – Spain
- IL
- International
- International Aero Engines – Multinational
- Irwin
- Isaacson
- Ishikawajima-Harima Heavy Industries — Japan
- Isotov
- Isotta Fraschini — Italy
- Italian American Motor Engineering – Italy
- Ivchenko-Progress — Ukraine/Soviet Union

== J ==
- J.A.P.
- Almen
- J.A.P. – UK
- Jabiru Aircraft — Australia
- Jacobs — US
- Jalbert-Loire
- Jameson
- Janowski
- Roché
- Jendrassik
- Johnson
- JLT Motors
- JPX – France
- Junkers — Germany
- Junkers

== K ==
- König
- Kalep
- Kawasaki Heavy Industries Aerospace Company — Japan
- Kawasaki Heavy Industries
- Keikaufer
- Kemp
- Ken Royce — US
- Kessler
- KHD
- Kimball
- King-Bugatti
- Kinner — US
- Kirkham
- Klimov — Russia/Soviet Union
- Klöckner-Humboldt-Deutz — Germany
- Knox
- Koerting
- Kolesov
- Konrad
- Korting
- Kostovich
- Kroeber
- Kuznetsov — Russia/Soviet Union

== L ==
- Lanitz Aviation
- Lawrance — US
- Le Rhône — France
- LeBlond Aircraft Engine Corporation — US
- Lee
- Lenape
- Les Long Long Harlequin
- Lessner
- LHTEC — US
- Liberty
- Light
- Limbach Flugmotoren — Germany
- LMC – China
- Lincoln Motor — US
- Lincoln
- Lockheed
- LOM Praha (Letecke Opravny Malesice, Praha)
- Loravia
- Lorraine-Dietrich — France
- Lotarev
- Lotarev — Russia/Soviet Union (see Ivchenko-Progress)
- Loughead Aircraft Mfg Co
- LSA-Engines
- Lucas
- Lycoming
- Lyulka — Russia/Soviet Union
- LZ Design

== M ==
- MacClatchie
- Macomber Avis Engine Co
- MAN-Rolls-Royce
- Manfred Weiss
- Manly
- Mantovani
- Marchetti
- Marcmotor
- Marlin-Rockwell
- Marquardt Corporation
- Martin Motors Co
- Maru
- Maximotor
- Maybach — Germany
- Mayo
- McCulloch Motors — US
- McDonnell
- McDowell
- Mead
- Mekker
- Menasco Motor Company — US
- Mercedes
- Mercedes-Benz — Germany
- Métallurgique
- Meteor
- Meteormotor
- Metropolitan-Vickers — UK
- Metz
- Michigan Aero-Engine Corporation
- Microturbo — France
- Miese
- Mikulin — Russia/Soviet Union
- Mikulin-Stechkin
- Milwaukee Tank
- Mistral Engine Company – Switzerland
- Mitsubishi Aircraft Company — Japan
- Modena Avio Engines
- Lambert Engine Division
- Morehouse
- Mors
- Motorav Industria
- Motor Sich — Ukraine
- Oberursel — Germany
- Motorlet
- Mozhaiskiy
- MTR
- MTR (MTU/Turbomeca/Rolls-Royce) — Europe
- MTU Aero Engines — Germany
- Mudry
- MTH Racing engines
- Murray-Willat
- MWfly

== N ==
- N.A.G.
- N.E.C.
- Nagel
- Nakajima Aircraft Company — Japan
- D. Napier & Son — UK
- National Aerospace Laboratory of Japan
- National
- Nelson
- New Britain Machine Company
- Nihonnainenki
- Noel Penny Turbines – UK
- Normalair-Garrett
- Northrop
- Norton
- NST-Machinenbau

== O ==
- Oberursel
- Orenda Engines — Canada
- Orlo
- Otto-Flugzeugwerke – Germany

== P ==
- Packard — US
- Palmer Motor Co
- Panhard & Levassor
- Parker
- Parma Technik sro
- PBS Velká Bíteš — Czech Republic
- Parodi
- Pegasus Aviation (NZ) Ltd — New Zealand
- Peterlot
- Phillips
- Piaggio-Lycoming (United States and Italy)
- Piaggio — Italy
- Pieper
- Pierce
- Pipe
- Pobjoy Airmotors — UK
- Poinsard
- Polish Engines — Poland
- Porsche
- Potez — France
- Power Jets — UK
- PowerJet — Russia
- Poyer
- Praga — Czech Republic
- Praha-Jinonice — Czech Republic
- Praha-Liben — Czech Republic
- Pratt & Whitney Canada — Canada
- Pratt & Whitney — US
- Price Induction — France
- Pulch
- Pulsar
- PZI — Poland
- PZL — Poland

== Q ==
- Quick Motors Co

== R ==
- Radne Motor AB
- Rapp-Motorenwerke GmbH — Germany
- Rasmussen
- Rausenberger
- Raven Redrives
- RBVZ
- Reaction Motors — US
- Rearwin
- Rectimo
- Redrup
- RED Aircraft GmbH – Germany
- Régnier Engines – France
- Reid Gas Engine Co — US
- Renault — France
- R.E.P.
- RFB
- Rheinmetall-Borsig
- Ricardo
- Ricardo-Halford — UK
- Righter — US
- Roberts Motor Co
- Rockwell International — US
- Rocky Mountain
- Rolls-Royce Limited — UK
- Rolls-Royce North America — US
- Rolls-Royce plc — UK
- Rolls-Royce/SNECMA
- Rolls-Royce/Turbomeca
- Rotax — Austria
- Rotec Aerosport — Australia
- Rotex Electric
- RotorWay International — US
- Rotron Aerospace
- Rover Company
- Royal Aircraft Factory — UK
- RRJAEL
- Rumpler
- Ryan Aeronautical Corp

== S ==
- Saab AB — Sweden
- SAHA (Iran aviation) — Iran
- SACMA
- Salmson — France
- NPO Saturn — Russia
- Schmidding — Germany
- Scott
- Seld
- SEPR
- SERMEL
- Shenyang — China
- Shvetsov — Russia/Soviet Union
- Siddeley-Deasy — UK
- Siemens — Germany
- Siemens-Halske — Germany
- Silnik
- Simms
- Skoda Works — Czech Republic
- Skymotors
- SMA Engines
- Smalley
- SME Aircraft Engine
- Smith
- SNECMA — France
- Sodemo Moteurs
- Solar Aircraft Company — US
- Soloviev — Russia/Soviet Union
- Subaru — Japan
- Speer
- Sperry
- Star
- Statax
- Straughan
- Studebaker-Waterman
- Studebaker — US
- Sturtevant
- Sunbeam Motor Car Company — UK
- Superior Air Parts
- Svenska Flygmotor — Sweden
- Szekely Aircraft & Engine Co — US

== T ==
- Take Off GmbH
- Technopower
- Techspace Aero — Belgium
- Teledyne Continental Motors — US
- Thaheld
- Scott — UK
- Thermo-Jet Standard Inc.
- Thielert — Germany
- Thomas Aeromotor Co Inc
- Thorotzkai
- Thunder Engines Inc.
- Tips
- Tips & Smith
- TNCA
- Tokyo Gasu Denki — Japan
- Trace Engines — US
- Train
- Tumansky — Russia/Soviet Union
- Turbo-Union — Germany
- Turbomeca
- Turboméca/HAL
- Turbomecanica — Romania
- Turkish Aerospace Industries — Turkey

== U ==
- Ufimtsev
- ULPower — Belgium
- Union Gas Engine Co

== V ==
- Van Blerck Engine Co
- Vaxell
- Vedeneyev
- Velie Motors Corporation — US
- Verner Motor — Czech Republic
- Vernier
- Viale
- VIJA
- Viking
- Villiers-Hay
- Vittorazi Motors
- Vivinus
- Volvo Aero — Sweden
- von Behren
- Voronezh Mechanical Plant — Russia

== W ==
- Walter
- Walter Engines — Czech Republic
- Wankel AG
- Warbirds-engines (Cesky znalecky institut s.r.o.)
- Warner Aircraft — US
- WASAG
- Welch
- Wells & Adams
- Werner
- West Engineering
- Western
- Westinghouse Electric Corporation — US
- Whitehead
- Wickner
- Wiley Post
- Wilksch
- Krautter
- Robinson
- Williams
- Williams International — US
- Wisconsin Motor Manufacturing Company
- Wolseley Motors — UK
- Wright Aeronautical
- Wright Company
- Wright-Gypsy
- Wright-Hisso
- Wright-Morehouse
- Wright-Siemens
- Wright-Tuttle

== X ==
- XAEC — China
- XCOR Aerospace

== Y ==
- Yamaha Motor Corporation — Japan
- York

== Z ==
- Zanzottera Technologies — Italy
- Zlin
- Zoche
- Zündapp
