= Brandner =

Brandner is a German surname. Notable people with the surname include:

- Christoph Brandner (born 1975), Austrian professional hockey winger
- Ferdinand Brandner (1903–1986), Austrian aerospace designer, S.S. Standartenführer in Nazi Germany
- Franz Brandner (born 1962), Austrian painter
- Gary Brandner (1933–2013), American horror author known for his werewolf themed trilogy of novels, The Howling
- Hans Brandner (born 1949), German former luger who competed for West Germany from the early 1970s to the early 1980s
- Josef Brandner (1915–1996), highly decorated panzer ace in the Wehrmacht during World War II
- Karl Brandner (1898–1961), American artist who worked primarily in landscapes
- Kaspar Brandner (1916–1984), highly decorated Oberjäger in the Wehrmacht during World War II
- Klaus Brandner, multiple people
- Michael Brandner, multiple people
- Patrik Brandner, Czech footballer
- Stephan Brandner (born 1966), German politician

Fictional characters:

- Achim Brandner, character on German soap opera Verbotene Liebe (Forbidden Love)
- Arno Brandner, character on German soap opera Verbotene Liebe (Forbidden Love)
- David Brandner, character on German soap opera Verbotene Liebe (Forbidden Love)
- Fabian Brandner, character on German soap opera Verbotene Liebe (Forbidden Love)
- Florian Brandner, character on German soap opera Verbotene Liebe (Forbidden Love)
- Jan Brandner, character on German soap opera Verbotene Liebe (Forbidden Love)
- Jana Brandner, character on German soap opera Verbotene Liebe (Forbidden Love)
- Katja Brandner, character on German soap opera Verbotene Liebe (Forbidden Love)
- Lydia Brandner, character on German soap opera Verbotene Liebe (Forbidden Love)
- Matthias Brandner, character on German soap opera Verbotene Liebe (Forbidden Love)
- Paul Brandner, character on German soap opera Verbotene Liebe (Forbidden Love)

== See also ==
- Brandner E-300, Egyptian turbojet engine, developed for the Helwan HA-300 light jet fighter
- Brander (disambiguation)
- Brandler
- Brandur
- Branner (disambiguation)
- Bronner
