= Aldasoro =

Aldasoro may refer to:

== People ==
=== Spanish first surname ===
- Eduardo Aldasoro Suarez (1894–1968), aviation pioneer
- Elda Miriam Aldasoro Maya, Mexican biologist and anthropologist
- Juan Pablo Aldasoro Suarez (1893–1962), aviation pioneer

=== Surname ===
- Andrés Aldasoro, Mexican mining engineer
- Aritz Aldasoro (born 1999), Spanish professional footballer
