= Kamala Nehru Park =

Kamala Nehru Park may refer to:

- Kamala Nehru Park, Mumbai
- Kamala Nehru Park, Pune
