= Helwan HA-300 =

Egyptian interceptor aircraft prototype

HA-300
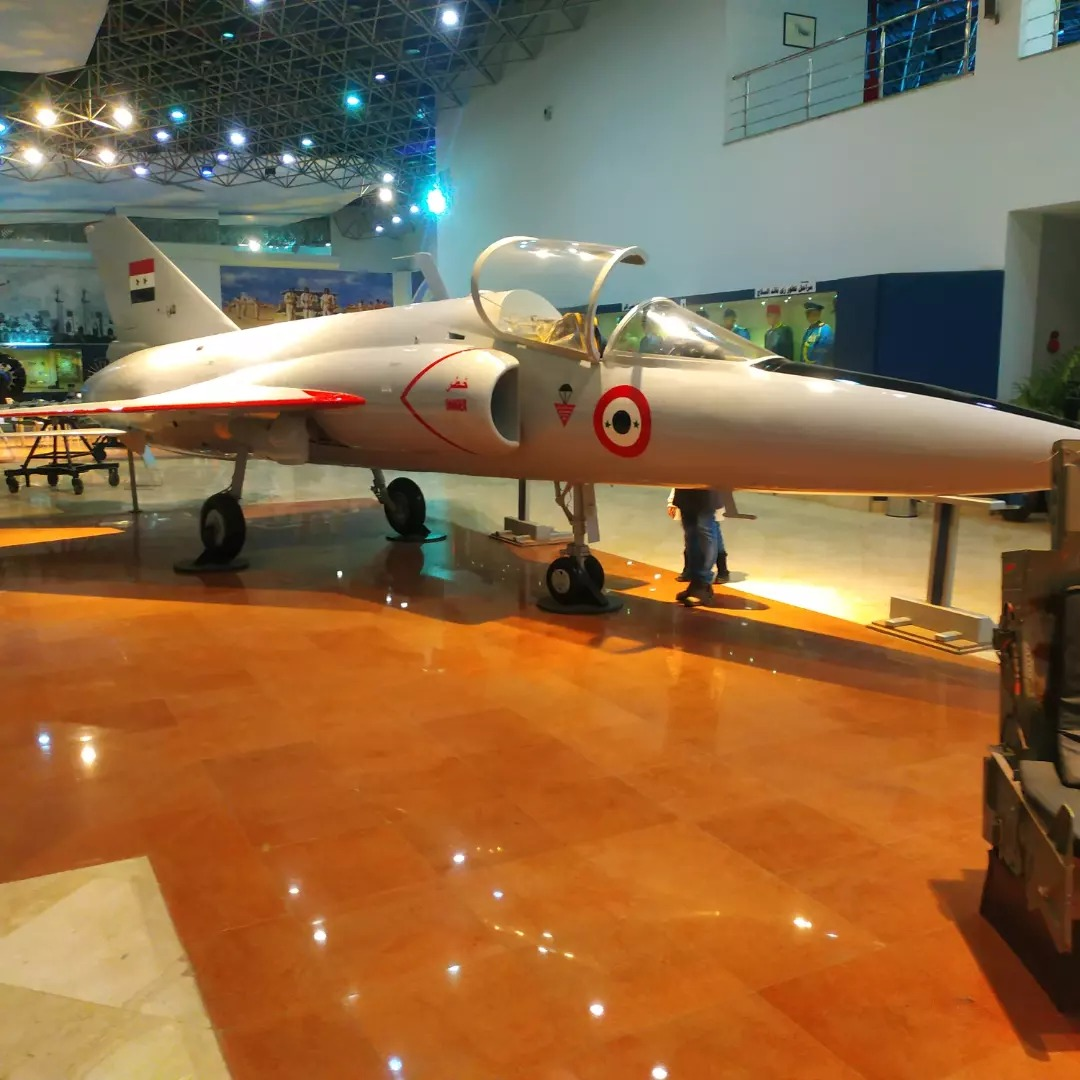

General information
- Type: Single-seat interceptor
- National origin: Egypt
- Manufacturer: Egyptian General Aero Organisation
- Designer: Willy Messerschmitt
- Status: Cancelled
- Primary user: Egyptian Air Force
- Number built: 3

History
- Manufactured: 1964–1969
- First flight: 7 March 1964

The Helwan HA-300 (Arabic: حلوان ٣٠٠) was a single-engine, delta-wing, light supersonic interceptor aircraft developed in Egypt during the 1960s.

At various stages, Spain and India were involved in the development program. Spain was financing two projects, the HA-200 and the Hispano HA-300, but cancelled the HA-300 project before a prototype was built due to overruns. Egypt then took over financing, and the program was transferred to Egypt where both it and its engine would be made, and where the aircraft was successfully flown. Near the end of the program, India began financing the development of the E-300 engine for use in the Indian HF-24 Marut jet fighter.

The HA-300 was an ambitious and costly project for Egypt, at a time when it was seeking to expand both its civilian and defence aviation industry.

== Design and development ==
=== Hispano HA P-300 (HA-23P) ===
At the end of World War II, German aircraft designer Willy Messerschmitt moved to Spain, where he joined Hispano Aviación and started designing an ultralight fighter aircraft in 1951.

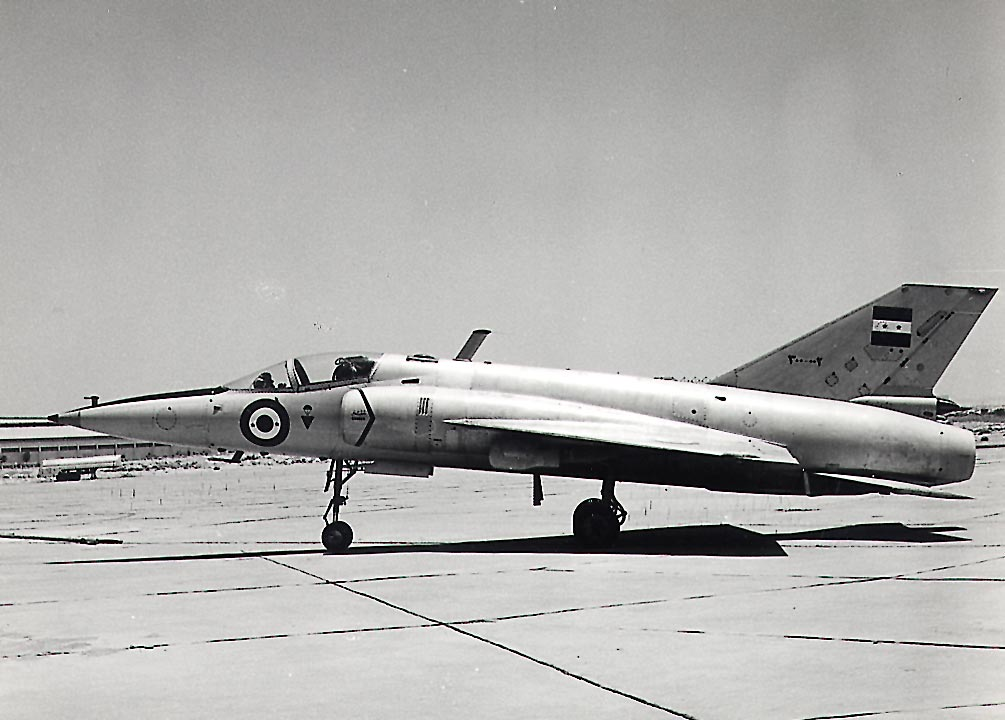
HA-300

When Messerschmitt was eventually allowed to start work on the project, designated the HA-300, he first built a tailless delta-winged glider, the Hispano HA P-300 (also known as the HA-23P). It was of mixed wood and metal construction, having a light alloy forward fuselage and wooden rear section. Of 20 feet 2 inches (6.15 m) span, the thin delta wing was also of mixed construction, with an area of 215 square feet (20.0 m^{2}) and an aspect ratio of 1.89:1. For test flights the glider was towed into the air, first by a car and then, more successfully, by a CASA 2.111. One test flight was prematurely terminated due to instability and the glider did not become airborne. Wind tunnel tests also confirmed the instability. Due to funding problems, non-availability of the planned afterburning Bristol Orpheus engine for production and the resultant long development time, Spain abandoned the project in 1960.

=== HA-300 transfer to Egypt ===
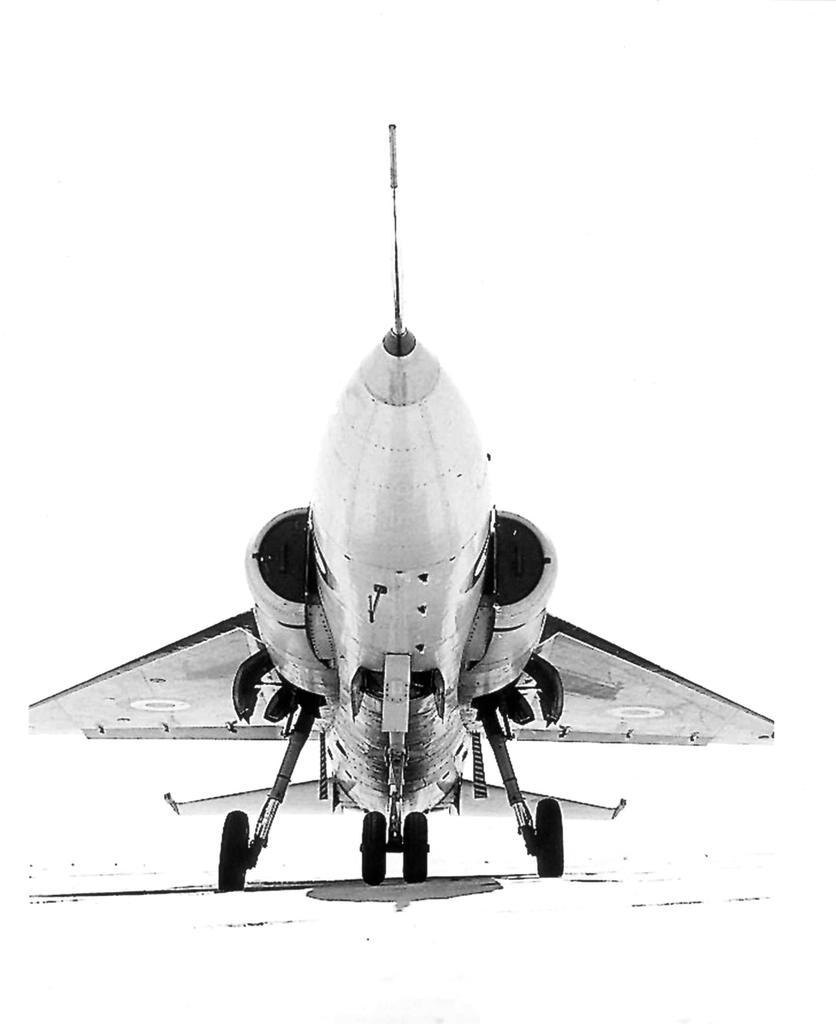
Front view of HA-300 showing tailed delta-wing and the undercarriage

Egypt then acquired the design from Hispano Aviación. The design team, headed by Messerschmitt, moved to Helwan, Egypt, to continue its work on the HA-300, which now stood for Helwan Aircraft 300. Ferdinand Brandner, an Austrian jet engine expert, was also invited to develop a turbojet for the new fighter, to replace the abandoned Orpheus. Egypt aimed to produce a lightweight supersonic, single-seat fighter that could join the Egyptian Air Force as an interceptor.

=== HA-300 ===
Egyptian development of the HA-300 started in the test facilities and workshops in Factory No. 36 in Helwan, southeast of Cairo, under the supervision of the Egyptian General Aero Organisation (EGAO), beginning officially in 1959.

Besides the addition of a jet engine with semicircular side intakes and single exhaust nozzle, the fighter also featured a slightly smaller wing with an additional low-mounted, all-moving tail stabilizer. Much of the avionics fit was of European origin.

The first prototype of the HA-300, still powered by a 2,200 kgf (22 kN; 4,900 lbf) Bristol Siddeley Orpheus 703-S-10, first flew on 7 March 1964, and achieved Mach 1.13. Egypt sent two Egyptian pilots to India in 1964 to prepare for the HA-300 flight development. It was followed by a second Orpheus-powered prototype which first flew on 22 July 1965.

The third and last prototype was fitted with the Egyptian E-300 engine, which it was hoped would make it capable of attaining 12,000 m (39,000 ft) and Mach 2.0 within 2.5 min after takeoff. However takeoff runs revealed teething problems with the engine and it never flew.

Over E£135 million was spent on the program.

=== E-300 Engine ===
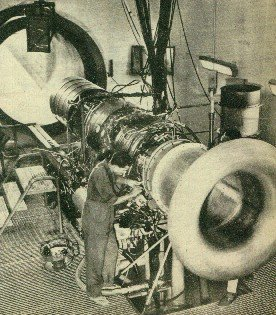
Brandner E-300 engine

The HA-300 fighter was originally designed around the 8,170 lbf (36.3 kN) afterburning Bristol Siddeley Orpheus Orpheus 703-S-10 turbojet, but aside from whether the British would even release it for use by the Egyptians, President Nasser saw that being dependent on a British engine was a major threat to national security, due to the potential for an embargo to ground the aircraft thanks to continued British hostility toward Egypt following the 1956 Suez Crisis when Britain, France and Israel invaded Egypt.

The HA-300 was modified for the Egyptian Brandner E-300 engine, whose planned output was to have been 10,600 lbf (47.2 kN) of thrust on afterburner, which would also improve the HA-300's performance. India assisted in funding its development in exchange for their use of it as the powerplant for their HF-24 Marut. The E-300 ran successfully for the first time in July 1963.

=== Termination ===
The Helwan-300 project was cancelled in May 1969. The reason was not publicly stated but financial and political factors likely played a part. In order to fill the now vacant role, Egypt established close contacts with the Soviet Union and purchased Soviet aircraft instead of continuing to develop indigenous designs.

== Aircraft on display ==
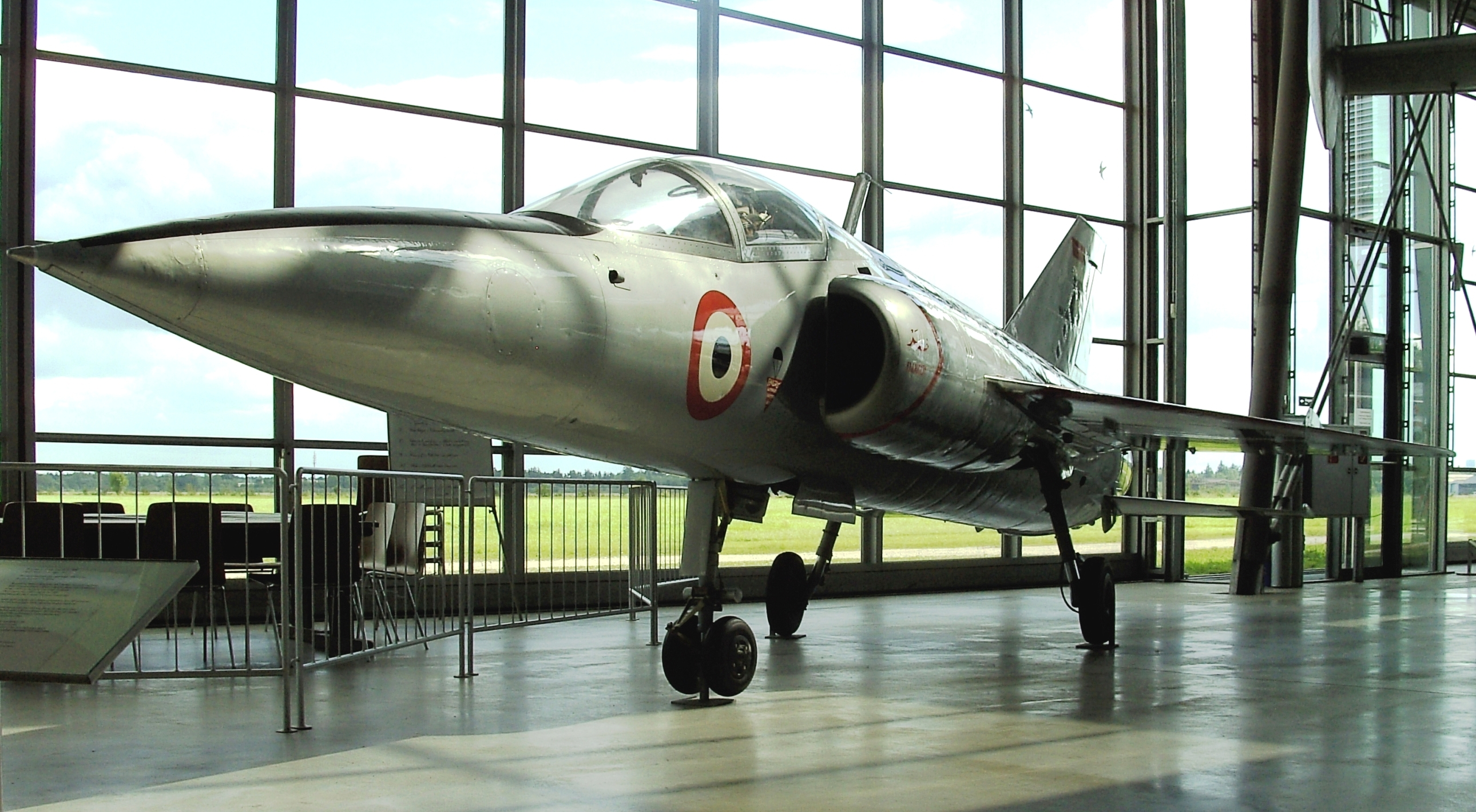
The first prototype Helwan HA-300 at the Deutsches Museum Flugwerft Schleissheim near Munich, Germany

- The first HA-300 prototype has been on display in the Deutsches Museum Flugwerft Schleissheim at Oberschleißheim near Munich since 1997. It was bought by Daimler-Benz Aerospace AG (DASA) and restored at Manching by MBB over a five and a half year period.
- One HA-300 is displayed by the Messerschmitt Stiftung in Manching.
- Another Ha-300 is displayed in the Air Force Museum in Cairo

== Specifications (HA-300 with Orpheus 703 engine) ==
Helwan HA-300 3-view drawing

Data from Deutsches Museum Flugwerft Schleissheim, theaircache.com,

General characteristics

- Crew: One
- Length: 12.40 m (40 ft 8 in)
- Wingspan: 5.84 m (19 ft 2 in)
- Height: 3.15 m (10 ft 4 in)
- Wing area: 16.70 m^{2} (179.8 sq ft)
- Airfoil: Biconvex 3%
- Empty weight: 2,100 kg (4,630 lb)
- Max takeoff weight: 3,200 kg (7,055 lb)
- Powerplant: 1 × Bristol Orpheus 703-S-10 (first two prototypes) turbojet, 21.6 kN (4,900 lbf) thrust dry, 36.3 kN (8,200 lbf) with afterburner
- Powerplant: 1 × Brandner E-300 (third prototype) turbojet, 32.4 kN (7,300 lbf) thrust dry, 47.2 kN (10,600 lbf) with afterburner

Performance

- Maximum speed: 2,100 km/h (1,300 mph, 1,100 kn)
- Maximum speed: Mach 1.98, Mach 2.1 with Brandner E-300 engine
- Range: 1,400 km (870 mi, 760 nmi)
- Service ceiling: 18,000 m (59,000 ft)
- Rate of climb: 203 m/s (40,000 ft/min)
- Wing loading: 125.749 kg/m^{2} (25.755 lb/sq ft)
- Power/mass: 0.88

== See also ==
Aircraft of comparable role, configuration, and era

- Dassault Mirage F1
- Dassault Mirage 5
- Folland Gnat
- Mikoyan-Gurevich MiG-21
- Northrop F-5

Related lists

- List of fighter aircraft
