= E300 =

E300 or E-300 may refer to:

- Alexander Dennis Enviro300, a popular British bus built upon various chassis
- Brandner E-300, an Egyptian turbojet engine
- HB-E300 series, a Japanese hybrid diesel train type
- Olympus E-300, a digital camera manufactured by Olympus
- PowerPC e300, a family of microprocessor cores
- Ascorbic acid, a compound numbered E300 in the European food additive E number system
- Eurostar e300, a class of Eurostar passenger trains also known as British Rail Class 373 and TGV TMST
- Extra 300, an acrobatic monoplane
