= Clerget-Blin =

French aircraft engine manufacturer

Clerget, Blin et Cie
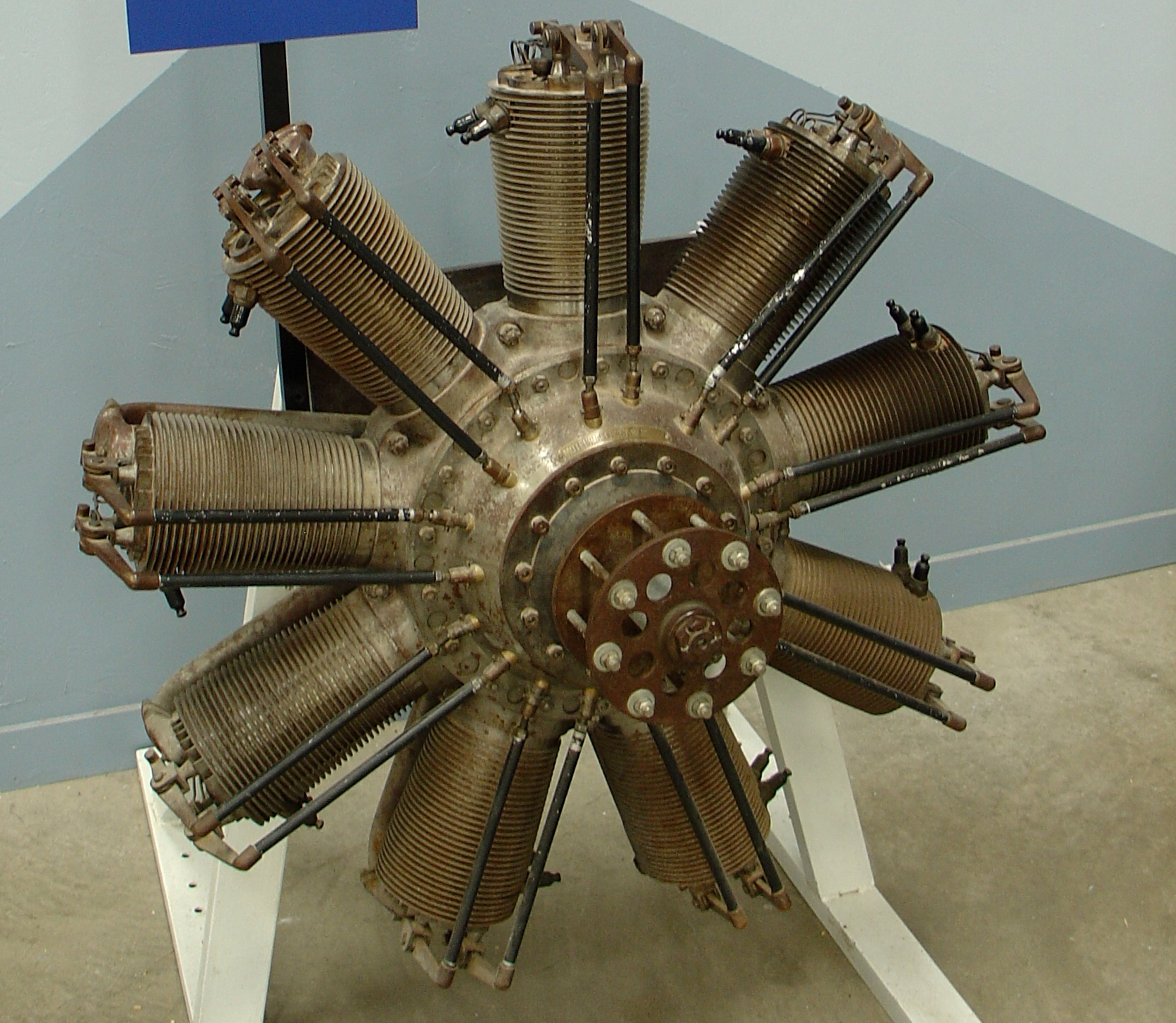
- Clerget 9B rotary engine
- Industry: Aerospace engineering
- Founded: 18 August 1913
- Defunct: September 1920
- Fate: Bankruptcy
- Headquarters: Levallois-Perret, France
- Key people: Pierre Clerget(fr) (Designer)
- Products: Aircraft engines

Clerget-Blin (full name being Société Clerget-Blin et Cie) was a French aircraft engine manufacturer formed in 1913 by the engineer and inventor Pierre Clerget(fr) and industrialist Eugène Blin. During World War I, the company and its licensees produced over 30,000 rotary engines.

Following World War I, a sharp decline in aircraft engine orders combined with heavy taxes imposed by the French government led to the bankruptcy and subsequent closure of the firm in September 1920.

Eugène Blin committed suicide in December 1920. Pierre Clerget joined the Service Technique de l'Aéronautique (STAé) as an engineer, where he specialised in the study of aircraft diesel engines.

== Products ==
The Clerget-Blin company mainly produced aircraft engines. Their successful rotary engine designs were also built in Britain by companies such as Gwynnes Limited, Ruston Proctor, and Gordon Watney, to increase production during World War I.

== See also ==
- List of aircraft engine manufacturers

== Notes ==
=== Bibliography ===
- Gunston, Bill. World Encyclopaedia of Aero Engines. Cambridge, England. Patrick Stephens Limited, 1989. ISBN 1-85260-163-9
- Hartmann, Gerald. Pierre Clerget (1875-1943): Un motoriste de génie. Editions de l'Officine, 2004. ISBN 978-2914614641
- Lumsden, Alec. British Piston Engines and their Aircraft. Marlborough, Wiltshire: Airlife Publishing, 2003. ISBN 1-85310-294-6.
