= VIJA J-16Ti =

2010s French piston aircraft engine

J-16Ti
- Type: Aircraft engine
- National origin: France
- Manufacturer: VIJA Aircraft Engines
- Manufactured: 2010-2015

The VIJA J-16Ti is a French aircraft engine, designed and produced by VIJA Aircraft Engines of Toulouse for use in ultralight and homebuilt aircraft.

The company was founded in 2004 and went out of business in about 2015, ending production.

== Design and development ==
The engine is a turbocharged, four-cylinder four-stroke, in-line, 1,186 cc (72.4 cu in) displacement, 16 valve, air-cooled, fuel injected motorcycle conversion, petrol engine design, with a mechanical gearbox reduction drive with a reduction ratio of 2.55:1. It employs electronic ignition and produces 160 hp (119 kW) at 7000 rpm.

== Specifications (J-16Ti) ==
Data from Tacke

=== General characteristics ===
- Type: Four cylinder, four stroke aircraft engine
- Bore: 80 mm (3.1 in)
- Stroke: 58 mm (2.3 in)
- Displacement: 1,186 cc (72.4 cu in)
- Length: 585 mm (23.0 in)
- Width: 610 mm (24.0 in)
- Height: 570 mm (22.4 in)
- Dry weight: 88 kg (194.0 lb)

=== Components ===
- Turbocharger: yes
- Fuel system: Fuel injection
- Fuel type: petrol
- Cooling system: air
- Reduction gear: mechanical gearbox, reduction ratio 2.55:1

=== Performance ===
- Power output: 160 hp (119 kW) at 7000 rpm

== See also ==
Related lists

- List of aircraft engines
