= VIJA AG-12Si =

2000s French piston aircraft engine

AG-12Si
- Type: Aircraft engine
- National origin: France
- Manufacturer: VIJA Aircraft Engines

The VIJA AG-12Si is a French aircraft engine, designed and produced by VIJA Aircraft Engines of Toulouse for use in ultralight and homebuilt aircraft.

The company was founded in 2004 and went out of business in about 2015, ending production.

== Design and development ==
The engine is a four-cylinder four-stroke, in-line, 1,216 cc (74.2 cu in) displacement, 16 valve, air-cooled, fuel injected motorcycle conversion, petrol engine design, with a mechanical gearbox reduction drive with a reduction ratio of 2.55:1. It employs electronic ignition and produces 120 hp (89 kW) at 7100 rpm, with a compression ratio of 11.5.

== Variants ==
AG-12Si
Base model with a weight of 84 kg (185.2 lb).
AG-12Sbi
Model with a weight of 79 kg (174.2 lb).

== Specifications (AG-12Si) ==
Data from Tacke

=== General characteristics ===
- Type: Four-cylinder, four stroke aircraft engine
- Bore: 81 mm (3.2 in)
- Stroke: 59 mm (2.3 in)
- Displacement: 1,186 cc (72.4 cu in)
- Length: 585 mm (23.0 in)
- Width: 485 mm (19.1 in)
- Height: 565 mm (22.2 in)
- Dry weight: 84 kg (185.2 lb)

=== Components ===
- Fuel system: Fuel injection
- Fuel type: petrol
- Cooling system: air
- Reduction gear: mechanical gearbox, reduction ratio 2.55:1

=== Performance ===
- Power output: 120 hp (89 kW) at 7100 rpm
- Compression ratio: 11.5:1

== See also ==
Related lists

- List of aircraft engines
