= Wankel AG LCR - 814 TGti =

German aircraft motor

LCR - 814 TGti
- Type: Aircraft engine
- National origin: Germany
- Manufacturer: Wankel AG

The Wankel AG LCR - 814 TGti is a German Wankel aircraft engine, designed and produced by Wankel AG of Kirchberg, Saxony for use in ultralight aircraft.

== Design and development ==
The LCR - 814 TGti engine is a twin-rotor four-stroke, 814 cc (49.7 cu in) displacement, liquid-cooled, fuel injected, petrol, Wankel engine design, with a toothed poly V belt reduction drive with a reduction ratio of 3:1. It employs dual electronic ignition and produces 75 hp (56 kW) at 6000 rpm.

== Specifications (LCR - 814 TGti) ==
Data from Tacke

=== General characteristics ===
- Type: Twin rotor, four stroke, Wankel aircraft engine
- Displacement: 814 cc (49.7 cu in)
- Length: 600 mm (23.6 in)
- Width: 462 mm (18.2 in)
- Height: 430 mm (16.9 in)
- Dry weight: 46 kg (101.4 lb)

=== Components ===
- Fuel type: petrol, 92 octane
- Cooling system: liquid
- Reduction gear: toothed poly V belt

=== Performance ===
- Power output: 75 hp (56 kW)

== See also ==
- Wankel AG LCR - 407 SGti

Related lists

- List of aircraft engines
