= Cieślak =

Cieślak (Polish pronunciation: [ˈtɕɛɕlak]) is a Polish surname, it may refer to:

- Anna Cieślak (born 1980), Polish actress
- Brad Cieslak (born 1982), American football tight end
- Bronisław Cieślak (1943–2021), Polish actor and politician
- Jadwiga Jankowska-Cieślak (born 1951), Polish actress
- Larissa Cieslak (born 1987), Brazilian swimmer
- Maciej Cieślak (born 1969), Polish guitarist and songwriter
- Marek Cieślak (born 1950), Polish speedway rider
- Michał Cieślak (born 1968), Polish rower
- Michał Cieślak (born 1974), Polish politician
- Michał Cieślak (born 1989), Polish boxer
- Mikołaj Cieślak (born 1973), Polish actor and a cabaret artist
- Roman Cieślak, psychologist and professor at the SWPS University
- Ted Cieslak (1912–1993), Major League Baseball third baseman
- Wiktoria Cieślak (born 2000), Polish chess player
- Włodzimierz Cieślak (born 1950), Polish wrestler
- Czesława Cieślak, birth name of Violetta Villas (1938–2011), Polish cabaret star, singer, actress, composer and songwriter
