= Motorav 2.6 R =

Brazilian aircraft engine

- Type: Aircraft engine
- National origin: Brazil
- Manufacturer: Motorav

The Motorav 2.6 R is a Brazilian aircraft engine, designed and produced by Motorav of Bocaiúva Minas Gerais for use in ultralight and homebuilt aircraft.

== Design and development ==
The engine is a four-cylinder four-stroke, horizontally-opposed, 2,600 cc (158.7 cu in) displacement, air-cooled, direct-drive, gasoline engine design. It employs capacitor discharge ignition and produces 95 hp (71 kW) at 2800 rpm.

== Specifications (2.6 R) ==
Data from Tacke

=== General characteristics ===
- Type: Four cylinder, four stroke aircraft engine
- Bore: 94 mm (3.7 in)
- Stroke: 94 mm (3.7 in)
- Displacement: 2,600 cc (158.7 cu in)

=== Components ===
- Fuel type: gasoline
- Cooling system: air
- Reduction gear: none

=== Performance ===
- Power output: 95 hp (71 kW)

== See also ==
Related lists

- List of aircraft engines
