= Price Induction =

- Company type: Société anonyme
- Industry: Aerospace
- Founded: 1997
- Founder: Jean and Bernard Etcheparre
- Headquarters: Anglet, France
- Key people: Bernard Etcheparre, Chairman & CEO
- Products: Aircraft engines Educational & Research Test benches
- Number of employees: 50 (as of 2012)
- Subsidiaries: Price Induction Brasil, São José dos Campos, Brasil Price Induction Inc., Atlanta, GA, USA Price Induction GmbH, Berlin, Germany
- Website: www.price-induction.com

Price Induction is a French company which develops and manufactures the DGEN turbofan engines intended for light airplanes (4/6 seats) known as Personal Light Jets (PLJs). The company is based in Anglet and employs over fifty people. Three subsidiaries have been established in Atlanta, GA, USA, São José dos Campos, Brazil and Berlin, Germany.

== History ==
The company Price Induction was founded by Jean and Bernard Etcheparre who created and developed the companies Lectra Systèmes et Brigantine Aircraft. In 1996 and 1997 the design of an engine intended for light jets appeared to be a particularly promising subject and analytical studies were started. After three years of preparation which ended with the birth of the DGEN concept, it was decided to launch a development program based on it.

== DGEN ==
The DGEN program aims at developing a family of high-bypass-ratio two-spool unmixed-flow jet engines (turbofans) - the DGEN 380 and 390 - intended to equip 4- to 6-seat aircraft in a twin-engine configuration with a maximum take-off weight (MTOW) between 1400 and 2150 kg. The DGEN engines are recognized as being the only turbofans designed for the flight envelope of the general aviation (altitude under 25,000 ft, speed under Mach 0,35). The DGEN engines have an architecture typical of the civil aviation's turbofans and integrate innovations such as a geared fan and an "all-electric" concept.

The DGEN engine has been exhibited at the Paris Air Show, the General Aviation's Aero Expo in Friedrichshafen and the EAA AirVenture Oshkosh.

== WESTT ==
Price Induction is the designer and provider of the WESTT family product which was launched in 2010 and consists in educational and research tools intended for universities and research institutes. Based on the DGEN technology, the WESTT Solutions equip worldwide universities like the ISAE in Toulouse, France, the Brazilian flight school EWM Aviation Ground School, the Georgia Tech Institute of Technology à Atlanta, the Rzeszów University of Technology in Poland and the Civil Aviation University of China. In April 2012, Price Induction signed a commercial agreement with the Chinese aviation corporation AVIC International Holding Corporation.

== See also ==
- Geared turbofan
