= Brander =

Brander may refer to:

- Branding iron in human branding or livestock branding
- Fire ship

== Surname ==
- Georg Friedrich Brander (1713–1783), German precision mechanic and mathematician
- Gustavus Brander (1720–1787), English naturalist
- James A. Brander, Canadian economist and academic
- Jarrod Brander (born 1999), Australian rules football player

== Given name ==
- Brander Craighead (born 1990), Canadian football player
- Brander Matthews (1852–1929), American writer and educator

== Other ==
- Brander Gardens, Edmonton, a residential neighborhood in Edmonton, Alberta, Canada
- Brander Lake, Alberta, Canada
- Pass of Brander, Argyll and Bute, Scotland
  - Battle of the Pass of Brander, a 1309 battle in the Wars of Scottish Independence
