= Klaus Brandner =

Klaus Brandner may refer to:

- Klaus Brandner (politician) (born 1949), German politician
- Klaus Brandner (skier) (born 1990), German alpine ski racer
