= Franz Brandner =

Austrian painter (born 1962)

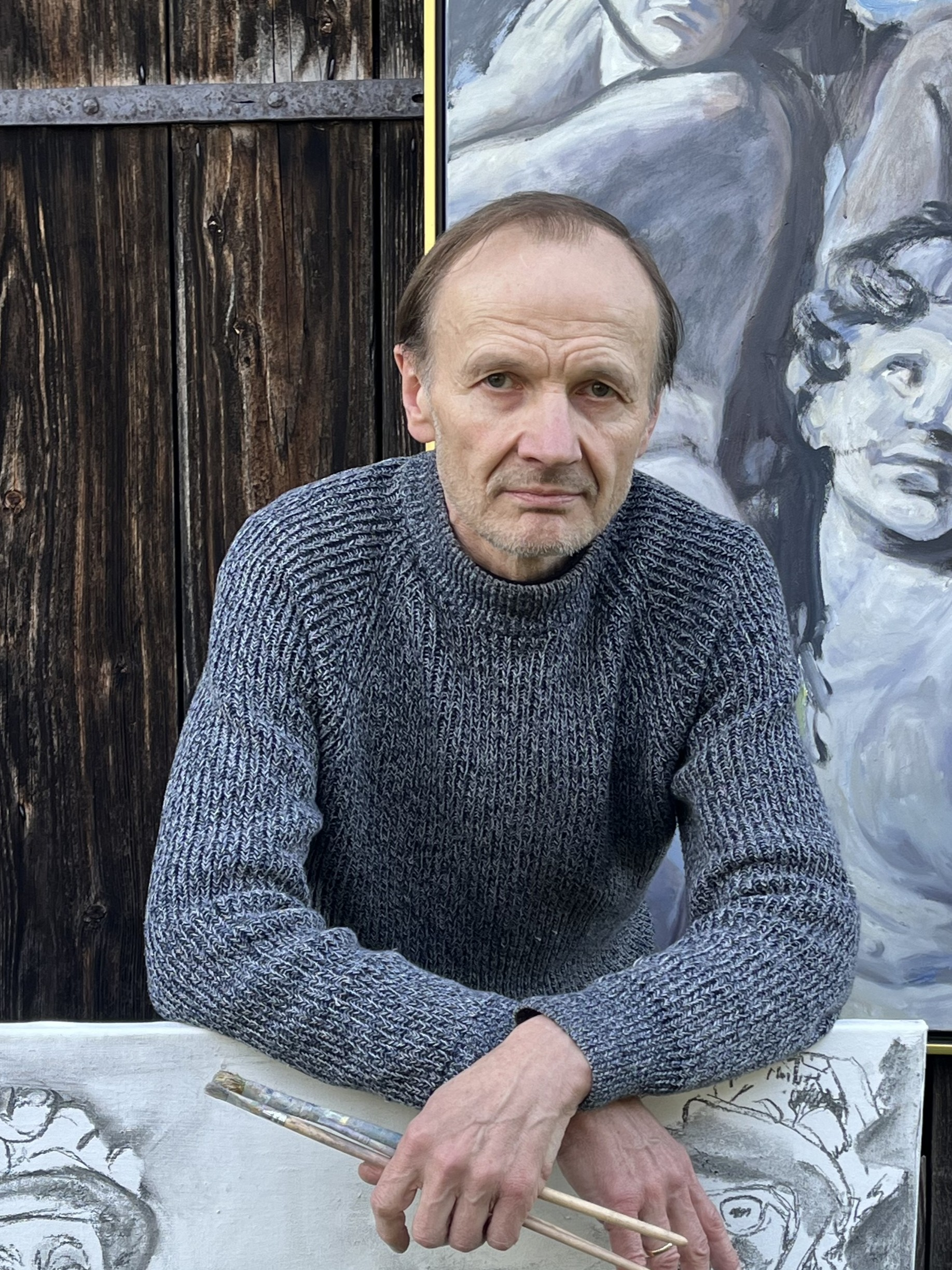
- Born: 11 February 1962 (age 64); Steyr, Austria
- Occupation: Painter
- Known for: Cross-cultural painting
- Movement: Contemporary art
- Website: artbrandner.com

Franz Brandner (born 11 February 1962) is an Austrian painter and contemporary artist based in Seoul, South Korea. His work focuses on figurative and impressionistic interpretations of landscapes, bridging European artistic traditions with Asian aesthetics. Media in both Austria and South Korea have reported on his role in cultural exchange between the two countries.

== Biography ==
Brandner was born in Steyr, Upper Austria. He graduated from art college in 1980 and began his professional career, including establishing a studio in Innsbruck, in 1982. Before relocating to Asia in the early 2000s, Brandner established his presence in the Austrian art scene. In February 2003, the Government of Lower Austria presented his solo exhibition Impressionen der Wirklichkeit (Impressions of Reality) at the Lower Austrian State Library in Sankt Pölten.

== Career in South Korea ==
Brandner moved to Seoul in 2002. In 2006, he served as the director of the newly opened "Vienna Art Gallery" in Seoul, an initiative noted for introducing Austrian contemporary art to Korean audiences.

=== Exhibitions ===
- 2023: Dialogue with Nature and Playground Stories, Special Exhibition for the 50th Anniversary of the Children's Grand Park, Seoul. The exhibition was supported by the city's cultural department.
- 2018: Bukchon Hanok Village, Edaily Art Gallery, Seoul.
- 2003: Impressionen der Wirklichkeit, Landhausgalerie Ausstellungsbrücke, Sankt Pölten, Austria. Hosted by the Government of Lower Austria.

== Artistic style ==
Brandner's style is generally described as figurative with strong impressionistic influences, using visible brushstrokes and thin layering of oil paints. The recurring theme in his Korean period is the "Dialogue with Nature," focusing on interpreting Korean motifs such as pine trees and traditional architecture through a European artistic lens.
