= Von Behren =

Von Behren is a German surname. Notable people with the surname include:

- Frank von Behren (born 1976), German team handball player
- Annie Von Behren (1857–1882), American stage actress
- David von Behren (born 1994), American organist and academic
