= Karl Brandner =

American painter

Karl C. Brandner (1898–1961) was an American landscape artist born in Oak Park, Illinois. Brandner trained as an artist at the Art Institute of Chicago and the Chicago Fine Art Academy, then worked as a photo engraver for the Chicago Tribune newspaper. While pursuing painting as a hobby, Brander became known as a regional artist in Illinois and Indiana. His landscapes and cityscapes were exhibited during his lifetime at the Hoosier Art Salon, the Chicago Gallery Association, and the Palette and Chisel Club. Two of Brandner's paintings, "The Red Mill" and "Wooded Acres," as well as two etchings, "Winter" and "Brown Country Idyll," are in the permanent collection of the Illinois State Museum.
