= Kamala Nehru Park, Pune =

Park in Ketkar Road, Erandwana, Pune

Coordinates: 18°31′02″N 73°50′04″E

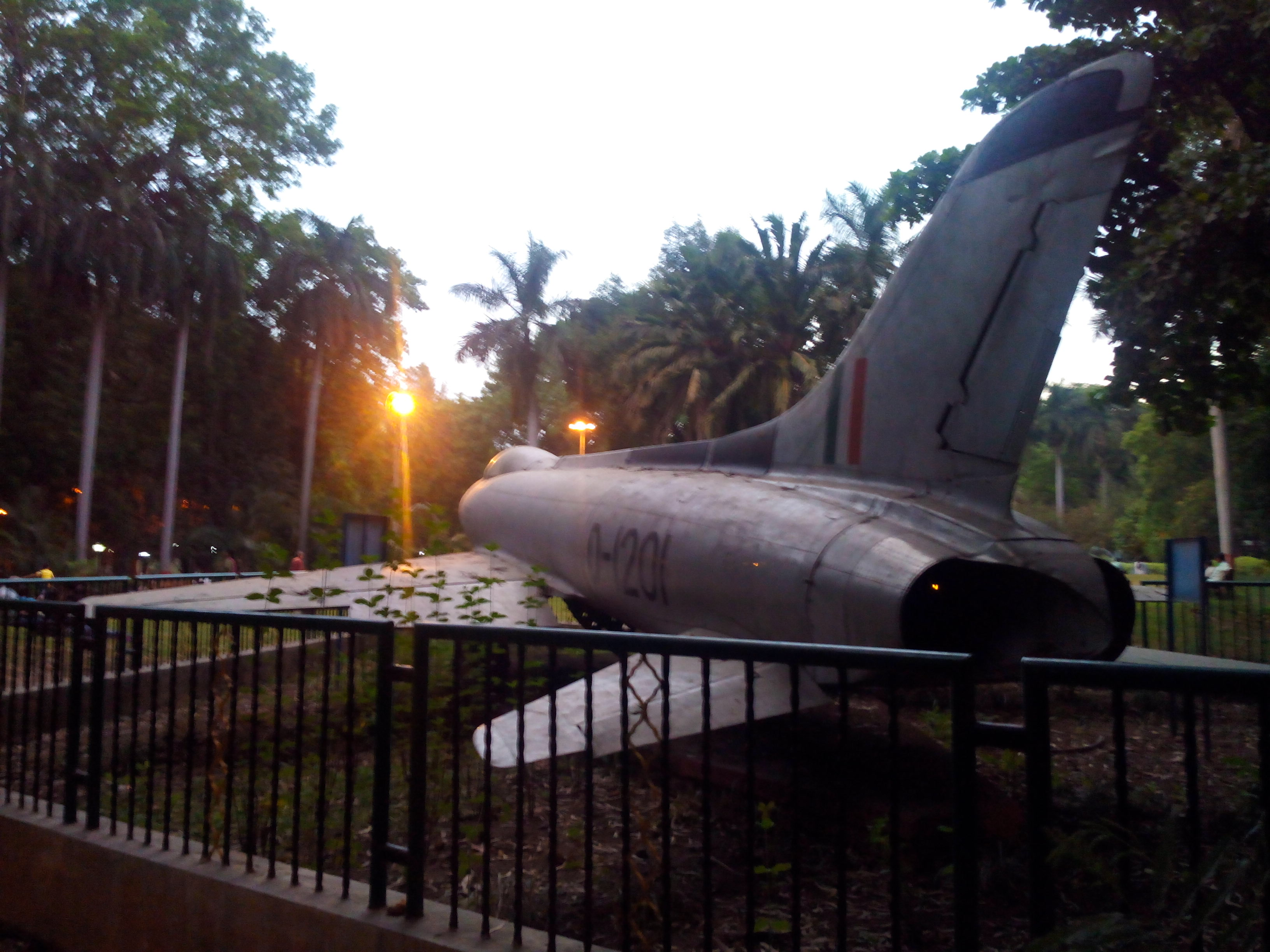
A HAL HF-24 Marut in the park

Kamla Nehru Park is situated on Dr. Ketkar Road, Erandwana, Pune. The 10-acre (4.0 ha) park has a jogging track, Playground for kids, a fountain and two lawns. A military jet (HAL HF-24 Marut) is also kept in one of the lawns. There are stalls of food item outside this park's main gate. The a temple of Lord Dutta next to this park. This park is couple of kilometers from Deccan Gymkhana.
