= HAL HF-24 Marut =

1961 fighter aircraft family by Hindustan Aircraft Limited

HF-24 Marut
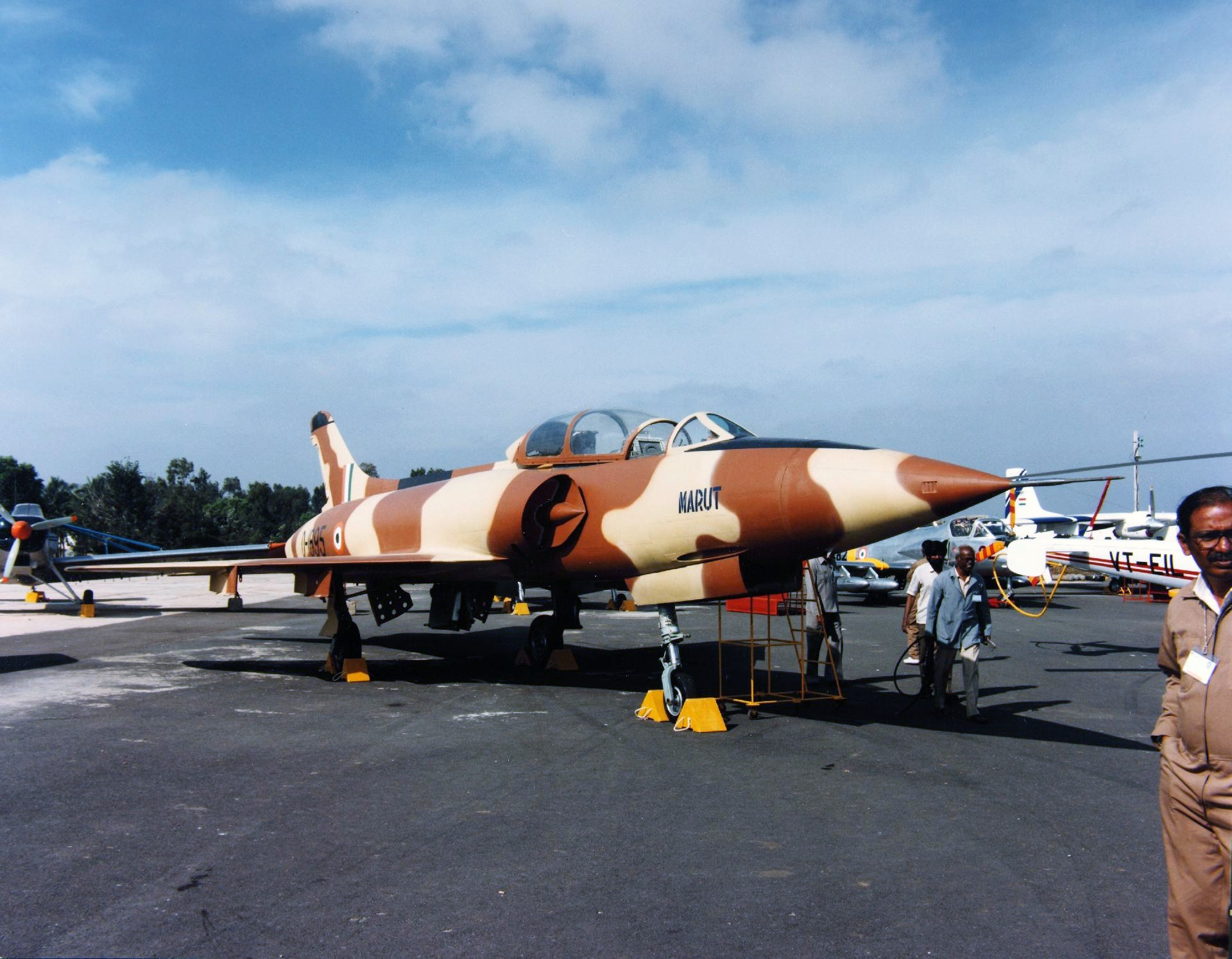

General information
- Type: Fighter-bomber
- National origin: India
- Manufacturer: Hindustan Aeronautics Limited
- Designer: Kurt Tank
- Primary user: Indian Air Force
- Number built: 147

History
- Introduction date: 1 April 1967
- First flight: 17 June 1961
- Retired: 1990

The HAL HF-24 Marut ("Spirit of the Tempest") is an Indian jet fighter aircraft developed and manufactured by Hindustan Aeronautics Limited (HAL) during the 1960s and early 70s. The Marut was designed by the German aeronautical engineer Kurt Tank, with the Project Engineer being George William Benjamin. The aircraft was the first Indian-developed jet fighter. On 17 June 1961, the type conducted its maiden flight; on 1 April 1967, the first production Marut was officially delivered to the IAF.

While the Marut had been envisioned as a supersonic-capable interceptor aircraft, it would never manage to exceed Mach 1. This limitation was principally due to the engines used, which in turn had been limited by various political and economic factors; multiple attempts to develop improved engines or to source alternative powerplants were fruitless.

The Marut's cost and lack of capability in comparison to contemporary aircraft were often criticised. Nevertheless, the Marut performed relatively well in combat, primarily as a fighter-bomber in the ground attack role. Most notably participating in the Battle of Longewala during the Indo-Pakistani war of 1971.

A total of 147 Maruts were manufactured, with the Indian Air Force (IAF) being the sole operator. By 1982, the Marut was becoming increasingly obsolescent, and was gradually phased out during the late 1980s.

The aircraft was named "Marut", after the storm gods of the Rig Veda, symbolising speed and power. This was part of a broader IAF tradition of Sanskrit-based naming for indigenously developed platforms.

== Design and development ==
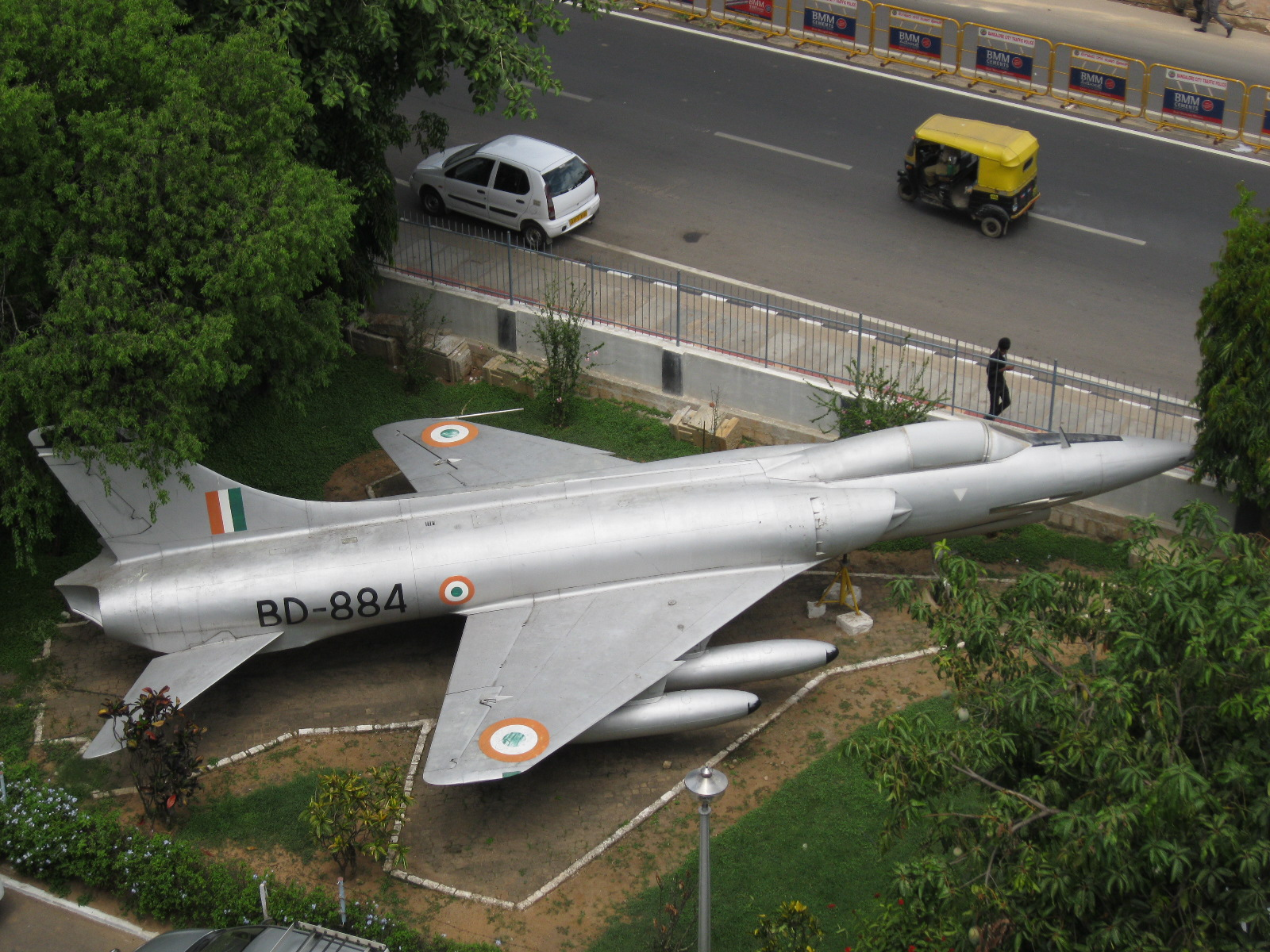
A preserved HF-24 Marut in Bengaluru

During the 1950s, Hindustan Aircraft Limited (HAL) had developed and produced several types of trainer aircraft, such as the HAL HT-2. However, elements within the firm were eager to expand into the then-new realm of supersonic fighter aircraft. Around the same time, the Indian government was in the process of formulating a new Air Staff Requirement for a Mach 2-capable combat aircraft to equip the Indian Air Force (IAF). However, as HAL lacked the necessary experience in both developing and manufacturing frontline combat fighters, it was clear that external guidance would be invaluable; this assistance was embodied by Kurt Tank.

In 1956, HAL formally began design work on the supersonic fighter project. The Indian government, led by Jawaharlal Nehru, authorised the development of the aircraft, stating that it would aid in the development of a modern aircraft industry in India. The first phase of the project sought to develop an airframe suitable for travelling at supersonic speeds, and able to effectively perform combat missions as a fighter aircraft, while the second phase sought to domestically design and produce an engine capable of propelling the aircraft. Early on, there was an explicit adherence to satisfying the IAF's requirements for a capable fighter bomber; attributes such as a twin-engine configuration and a speed of Mach 1.4 to 1.5 were quickly emphasised.

During development, HAL designed and constructed a full-scale two-seat wooden glider to act as a flying demonstrator. Designated HAL X-241, this replicated production aircraft in terms of dimensions, control configuration, and aerofoil sections. The wheel brakes, air brakes, flaps, and retractable undercarriage were all actuated using compressed gas, with sufficient gas storage aboard for multiple actuations per flight. On 3 April 1959, the X-241 flew for the first time, after being towed into the air by a Douglas Dakota Mk.IV (BJ 449). A total of 86 flights were conducted prior to the X-241 sustaining considerable damage in a landing incident, when the nose undercarriage failed to extend.

On 24 June 1961, the prototype Marut conducted its first powered flight. It was fitted with the same UK-manufactured Bristol Siddeley Orpheus 703 turbojets that were installed in the Folland Gnat airframes that were already being manufactured, under license, by HAL. While the Marut had been designed around significantly more powerful engines, the un-reheated Orpheus 703 was a viable powerplant for testing purposes. This meant that the Marut was barely capable of Mach 1, even though a top speed of Mach 2 had originally been considered necessary. Before suitable, afterburning engines had been obtained, the Indian Government decided to order 16 pre-production and 60 production Maruts, powered by the Orpheus 703.

The IAF was reluctant to operate a fighter aircraft with performance that was, at best, marginally better than its existing fleet of British-built Hawker Hunters. Due to the insufficient power of the Orpheus 703, the Marut was technically obsolete by the time the first production aircraft were completed, in 1964. ASTE also tested for integration of the NAVWASS suit from its eventual successor, the SEPECAT Jaguar on the HF-24.

On 1 April 1967, the first production Marut was officially accepted by the IAF. Only 147 aircraft, including 18 two-seat trainers, were completed out of a planned 214.

Following the first nuclear weapons tests by India, in 1974, adverse international public opinion worsened the chances of HAL obtaining better engines for the Marut; even spares for its existing Orpheus engines became scarce. This situation was one of the main reasons for the aircraft's early demise.

=== Termination and criticisms ===
The Marut was described as "essentially a very long-drawn-out failure", and the aircraft's shortcomings were considered to be due to multiple factors. Among these were the difficulties experienced in securing a suitable engine, which was principally a political issue; while arrangements were successfully established with the United Kingdom and Bristol Siddeley for HAL to domestically produce the Orpheus, it was only suitable as an interim measure as it lacked the power to enable the Marut to achieve supersonic speed. The Indian Government refused a proposal made by Rolls-Royce to finance further development of the Orpheus, which had been specifically aimed at producing a more suitable engine for the Marut.

Other envisioned alternative engines that might have been sourced from the Soviet Union, Egypt, or various European nations did not result in anything of substance. The Gas Turbine Research Establishment also pursued their own development program to improve the Orpheus without external aid, which proceeded to the testing phase with some favourable results, but proved incompatible with the Marut. As the particularities of a given airframe are typically heavily dependent on the engine used, the inability to improve the Marut's powerplant damaged its performance. India attempted to fit the VK-7 engines from the Soviet MiG-19 on the Marut, which again proved unfruitfull due to engine reliability issues.Despite experimentation with various engines, the Marut was never able to achieve supersonic speeds, which was viewed as a major failure. IAF had anticipated the Marut being fitted with a considerably superior engine.

The project was negatively affected by a lack of direction and management from the Indian Ministry of Defence. A lack of coordination between the military, politicians, and industry is alleged to have been typical throughout the entirety of the programme, leaving many issues down to industry alone without guidance. Specifically, the government never sanctioned the development of an engine design team, nor were there assessments of HAL's capability to reverse engineer or to apply technologies from other projects, such as the work performed for the Folland Gnat. HAL is claimed to have struggled to convince both the IAF and MoD that the design of the Marut was acceptable; much attention was given to the unacceptably high level of trail drag the airframe produced, as well as dissatisfaction with the Marut's speed and manoeuvrability, both of which were below IAF specification upon the aircraft's introduction.

Tank had a major influence on the project, and accordingly of its shortcomings. While working on the Marut, he was criticized for a rigid stance on aspects of the design, and he typically had little interest in lobbying the Indian government for funding to refine the design. In addition, however, elements of the IAF have been alleged to have held dismissive attitudes toward Tank and of his abilities, rarely coordinated with him on issues with the aircraft, which in turn exacerbated the type's performance issues. The level of technological transfer between Germany and India on the project was subject to criticism as well.

Limitations within the Indian aerospace industry, which lacked the infrastructure and scientific base to successfully produce an effective indigenous combat aircraft at that time, forced a heavy reliance on foreign technologies and imported components. HAL's willingness to undertake overly-ambitious defence projects may also be partially responsible for the project's outcome. The Marut was not only heavily dependent on foreign-sourced materials, but was more expensive to manufacture the type in India than to have imported completed aircraft. The level of indigenous components increased over time, reportedly reaching 70 per cent by December 1973. The allocation of scarce resources to reproducing components that could have been readily imported represented a high level of opportunity cost to India.

The IAF reportedly showed little confidence or interest in indigenous fighter technology, having openly expressed its preference for the French-built Dassault Ouragan as an alternative. By the time the Marut entered mass production, the IAF had already purchased foreign-built fighters such as the Hawker Hunter and Sukhoi Su-7. Following on from the Marut, HAL proceeded to produce larger quantities of both European and Soviet combat aircraft under license, such as the SEPECAT Jaguar, Mikoyan-Gurevich MiG-21, and Mikoyan MiG-27.

== Operational history ==
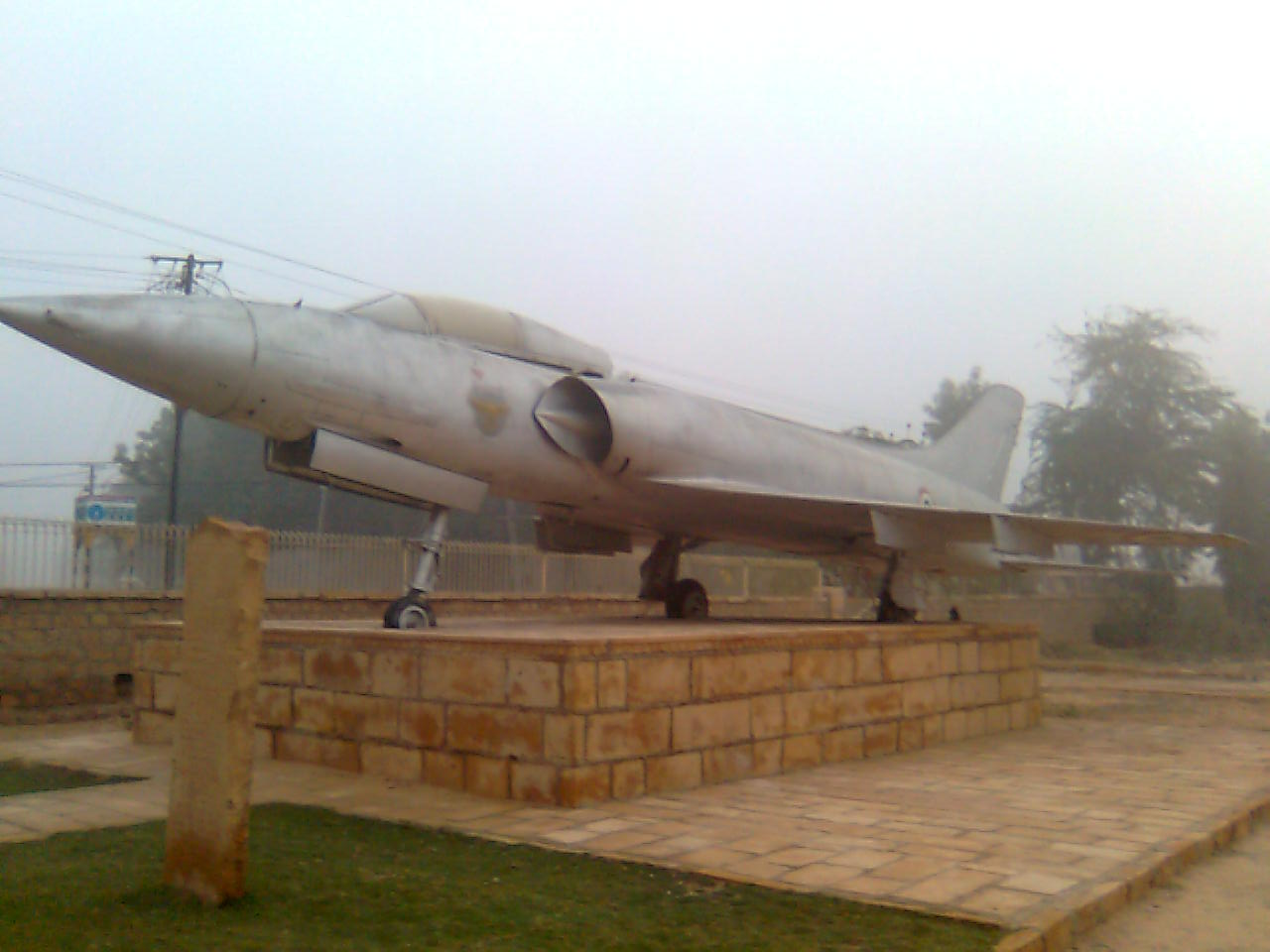
A preserved Marut on static display. This aircraft had participated in the Battle of Longewala.

The Marut was used in combat in a ground attack role, where its safety features such as manual controls whenever the hydraulic systems failed, and twin engines, increased survivability. According to aviation author Pushpindar Singh, the Marut had excellent low-level flying characteristics, but its maneuverability suffered due to the lack of engine power; maintenance issues also resulted in the type being problematic in service.

In 1967, a single Marut was used as a testbed for the Egyptian indigenously-developed Brandner E-300 engine. The Indian team was recalled in July 1969, while the Egypt-based Marut was abandoned.

Given the limited number of Marut units, most Marut squadrons were considerably over-strength for the duration of their lives. According to Brian de Magray, at peak strength No.10 Squadron had on charge 32 Maruts, although the squadron probably did not hold a unit-establishment of more than 16. The Marut squadrons participated in the 1971 war and none were lost in air-to-air combat, although three were lost to ground fire, and one was destroyed while taxiing on the ground and was subsequently starfed by a F-104. Three Marut pilots were awarded the Vir Chakra commendation.

Maruts constantly found themselves under heavy and concentrated fire from the ground during their low-level attack missions. On at least three occasions, Maruts managed to return to their base after one engine had been lost to ground fire. On one of these occasions, a Marut returned to base without escort on one engine, from about 150 mi (240 km) inside hostile territory. On another occasion, a pilot flying his Marut through debris that erupted into the air as he strafed a convoy felt a heavy blow to the rear fuselage of the aircraft, the engine damage warning lights immediately illuminated, and one engine cut out. Fortunately, the Marut attained a safe and reasonable recovery speed on one engine. Consequently, the pilot had no difficulty in flying his crippled fighter back to base. Another safety factor was the automatic reversion to manual control in the event of a failure in the hydraulic flight control system, and there were several instances of Maruts being flown back from a sortie under manual control. All in all, the Marut had a good survivability record in enemy airspace.

In the Indo-Pakistani War of 1971, some Maruts and Hawker Hunter aircraft were used to give close support to an Indian border post in the decisive Battle of Longewala, on the morning of 5 December 1971. The aerial attack was credited with destroying a large number of tanks that had been deployed by Pakistani ground forces. More than 300 combat sorties were flown by the Maruts during a two-week period in the war. During the conflict, HF-24 Marut pilots found themselves flying into Southern Pakistan and were often assigned to striking Hyderabad and Talhar unescorted and interdicting railway systems at Mirpur Khas and Rohri. Maruts also located and destroyed route of retreat the Pakistani army’s 22 Cavalry following Longewala. During the conflict, the Maruts were forward deployed at Uttarlai and Jodhpur

According to Indian reports, one aerial kill was recorded as having been achieved by a Marut. On 7 December 1971, Squadron Leader KK Bakshi of No. 220 Squadron shot down a PAF F-86 Sabre (reportedly flown by Flying Officer Hamid Khwaja of No. 15 Squadron of the Pakistan Air Force), however according to Pakistani reports, the F-86F Sabre (Serial No. 4030) had suffered an Engine flameout while chasing an Indian Hawker Hunter over Khushalgarh.

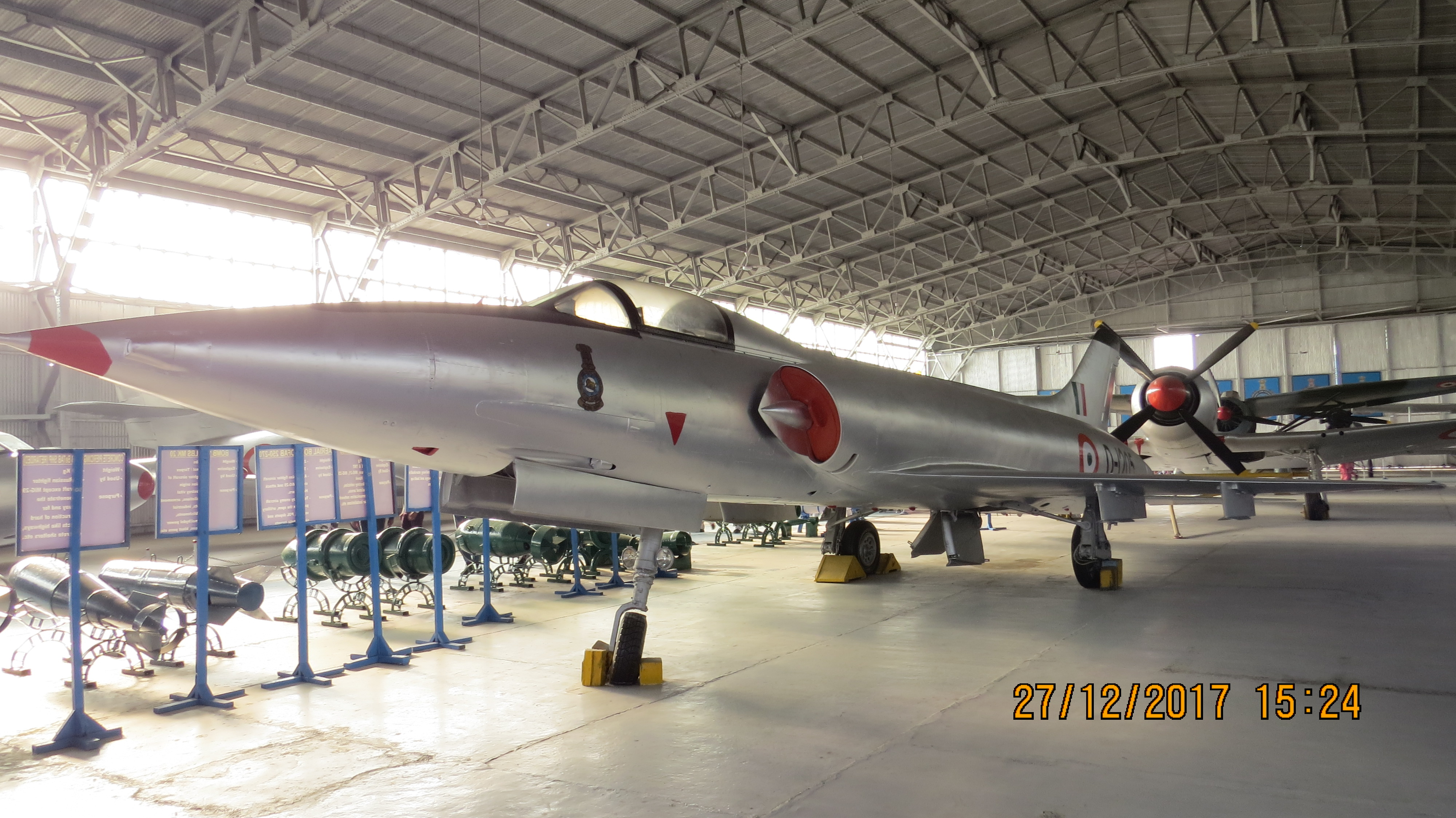
HAL HF-24 D-1205 preserved at the Indian Air Force Museum, New Delhi

By 1982, the IAF was proposing that the Marut fleet be phased out on the basis that the type was "no longer operationally viable". Supporters such as Air Commodore Jasjit Singh pointed out that the type had performed well in the 1971 combat, and had enjoyed superior safety records to other IAF aircraft such as the Gnat. Some aircraft had less than 100 recorded flight hours when the retirement of the Marut was being mooted.

== Variants ==
HAL X-241
A full scale research glider replicating the proposed production aircraft, with identical dimensions, control configuration and aerofoil sections.
Marut Mk.1
Single-seat ground-attack fighter.
Marut Mk.1A
The third pre-production aircraft fitted with an afterburning Bristol Siddeley Orpheus 703 with 18% boost at 5,720 lbf (25.44 kN) thrust.
Marut Mk.1 BX
A single Mk.1 converted as a flying test-bed for the Brandner E-300 turbojet engine.
Marut Mk.1T
Two-seat training version.
Marut Mk.1R
Two HF-24s fitted with two afterburning Bristol Siddeley Orpheus 703Rs with 18% boost at 5,720 lbf (25.44 kN) thrust.
Marut Mk.2
A projected Rolls-Royce Turbomeca Adour powered derivative.

== Former operators ==
India

- Indian Air Force
  - No. 10 Squadron IAF
  - No. 31 Squadron IAF
  - No. 220 Squadron IAF – last unit with the type, relinquished aircraft mid-1990

== Surviving aircraft ==
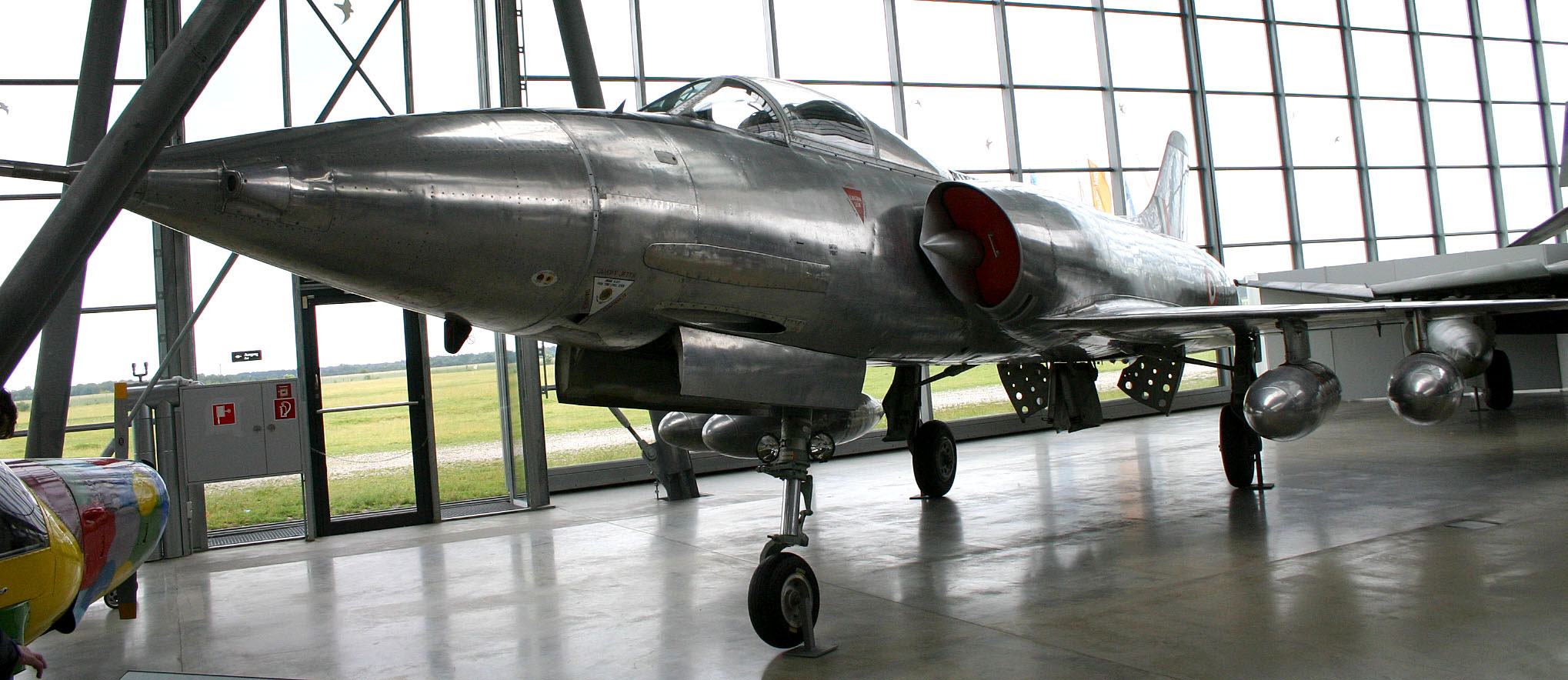
HF-24 Marut preserved at the Deutsches Museum Flugwerft Schleissheim near Munich

There are several surviving Maruts open to public inspection:

- Visvesvaraya Industrial and Technological Museum, Bangalore.
- HAL Museum, Bangalore
- Kamla Nehru Park, Pune.
- Nehru Science Centre, Mumbai.
- Periyar Science and Technology Centre, Chennai
- ASTE (Aircraft & Systems Testing Establishment), Bangalore
- Air Force Academy, Dundigul
- Deutsches Museum Flugwerft Schleissheim now on display at Museum für Luftfahrt und Technik Wernigerode
- Indian Air Force Museum, Palam
- Sainik School, Kazhakootam, Kerala

== Specifications (Marut Mk.1) ==
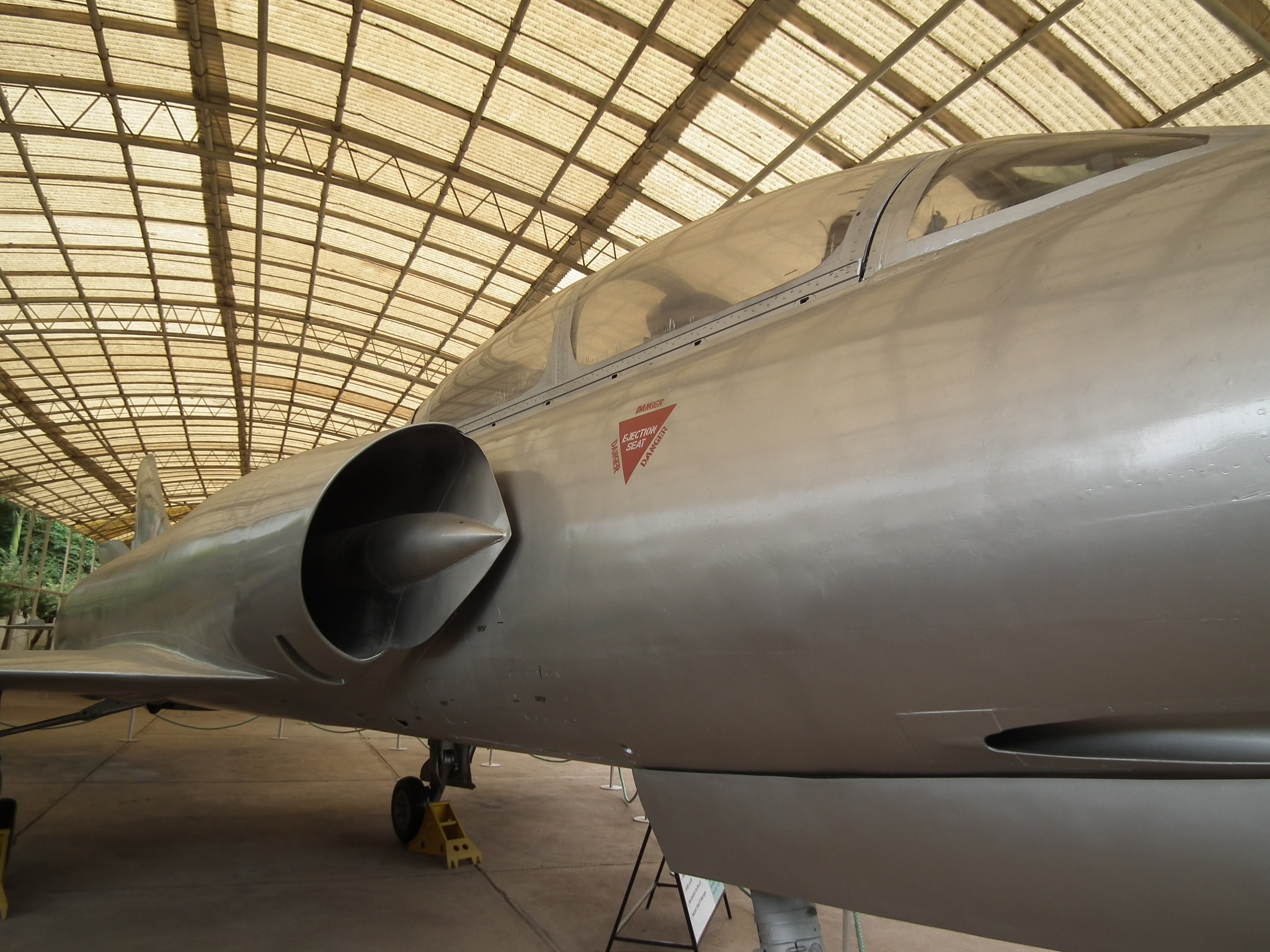
Midsection of Marut. Note the two-seat cockpit and the placement of the air intakes.

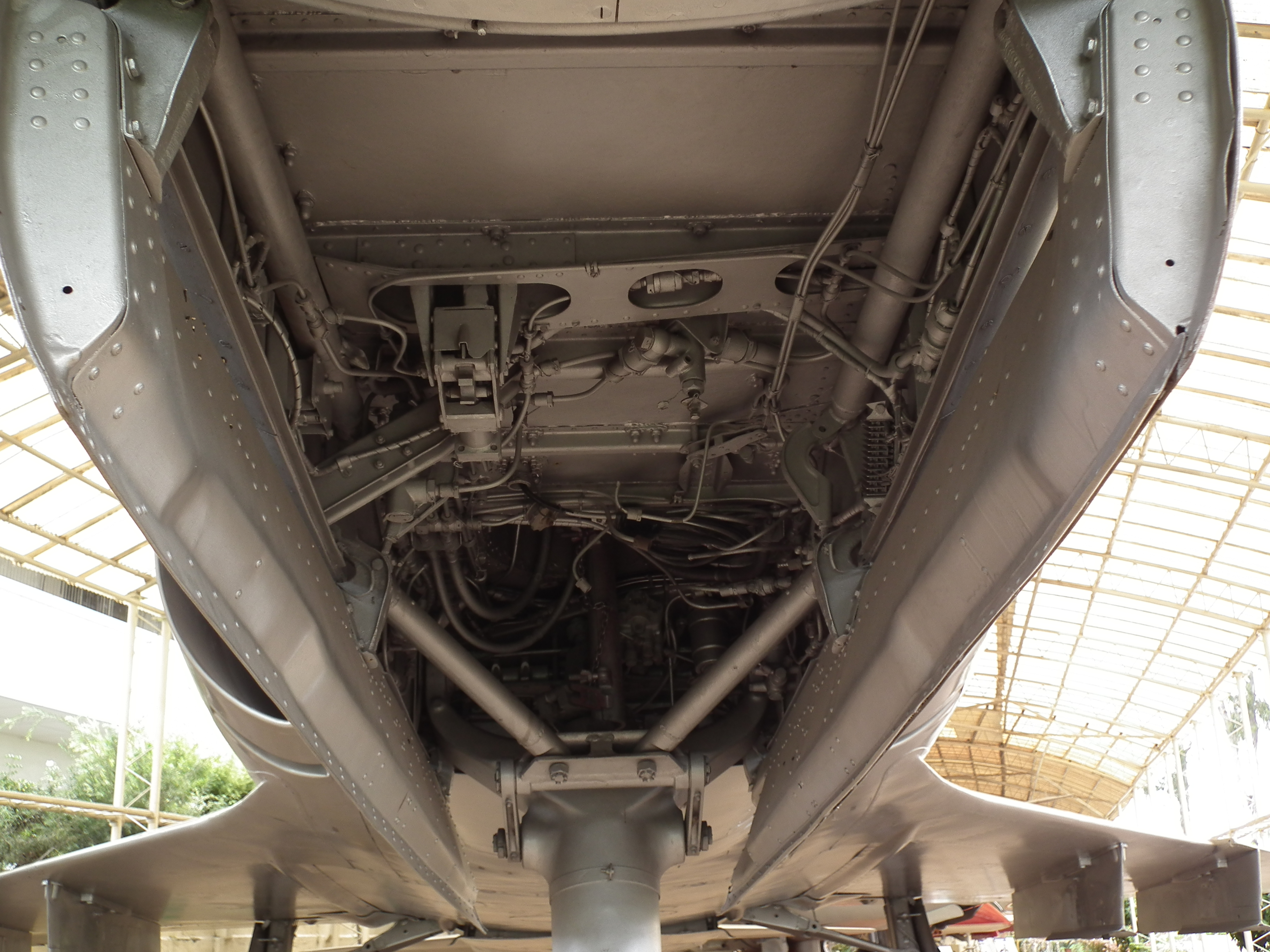
Closeup of a section of the underside of a Marut

Data from Jane's All The World's Aircraft 1976–77

General characteristics

- Crew: 1
- Length: 15.87 m (52 ft 1 in)
- Wingspan: 9.00 m (29 ft 6 in)
- Height: 3.60 m (11 ft 10 in)
- Wing area: 28.00 m^{2} (301.4 sq ft)
- Aspect ratio: 2.90:1
- Empty weight: 6,195 kg (13,658 lb)
- Max takeoff weight: 10,908 kg (24,048 lb)
- Fuel capacity: 2,491 L (658 US gal; 548 imp gal) usable internal fuel
- Powerplant: 2 × Bristol Siddeley Orpheus Mk 703 turbojets, 21.6 kN (4,900 lbf) thrust each

Performance

- Maximum speed: 1,112 km/h (691 mph, 600 kn) at sea level
- Maximum speed: Mach 0.93
- Stall speed: 248 km/h (154 mph, 134 kn) (flaps and landing gear down)
- Combat range: 396 km (246 mi, 214 nmi)
- Rate of climb: 22.5 m/s (4,444 ft/min)
- Time to altitude: 9 min 20 s to 12,000 m (40,000 ft)

Armament

- Guns: 4× 30 mm (1.18 in) ADEN cannon with 120 rpg
- Rockets: Retractable Matra pack of 50× 2.68 in (68 mm) rockets
- Bombs: Up to 4,000 lb (1,800 kg) on four wing pylons

== See also ==
External videos
- Video overview of the Marut
- News report on the 50th anniversary of the Marut's first flight
- Contemporary silent footage of the Marut at an air show, including an aerial display

Aircraft of comparable role, configuration, and era

- Bréguet 1100
- Fiat G.91Y
- Nanchang Q-5
- North American FJ-4 Fury
- Sukhoi Su-7
- Yakovlev Yak-26

Related lists

- List of aircraft of the Indian Air Force
- List of fighter aircraft
