= Wankel AG =

German engine manufacturer

- Company type: Aktiengesellschaft
- Industry: Aerospace; Automotive industry
- Headquarters: Kirchberg, Saxony, Germany
- Products: Aircraft engines Automotive engines
- Website: www.wankel-ag.de

Wankel AG is a German aircraft engine and automotive engine manufacturer based in Kirchberg, Saxony. The company specializes in the design and manufacture of Wankel engines for ultralight aircraft and also for kart racing cars.

The company is organized as an Aktiengesellschaft, a German share-owned limited corporation.

== Products ==
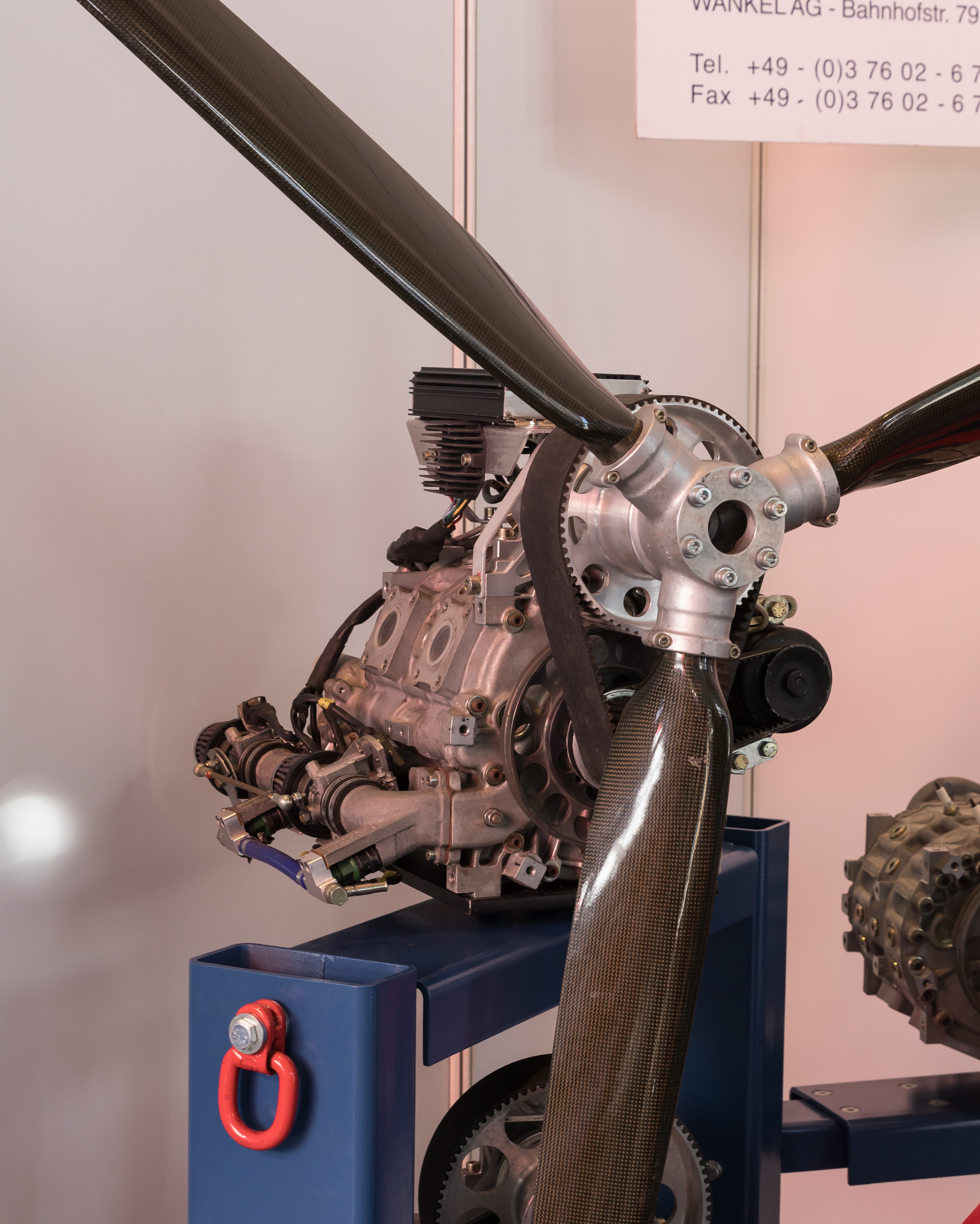
Wankel aircraft engine

The company's aircraft engine line consists of the single rotor Wankel AG LCR - 407 SGti four-stroke, 407 cc (24.8 cu in) displacement, liquid-cooled, fuel injected, petrol, Wankel engine that produces 37 hp (28 kW) at 6000 rpm and the dual rotor Wankel AG LCR - 814 TGti 814 cc (49.7 cu in) displacement, liquid-cooled, fuel injected, petrol, Wankel engine design, that produces 75 hp (56 kW) at 6000 rpm.

The kart engines offered include the LCR 407 SG/K (KR) and LCR 407 SG/W, both single rotor, 407 cc (24.8 cu in) displacement, carburetor-equipped designs that produce 41 hp (31 kW) at 6800 rpm, plus the LCR 407 SG/KR, a single rotor, 407 cc (24.8 cu in) displacement, carburetor-equipped design that produces 43 hp (32 kW) at 6900 rpm.

== Aircraft engines ==
Summary of aircraft engines built by Wankel AG:

- Wankel AG LCR - 407 SGti
- Wankel AG LCR - 814 TGti
