= Andrés Aldasoro =

Mexican mining engineer

Andrés Aldasoro Espinoza was a Mexican mining engineer. He was the director of several mines during the rule of Porfirio Díaz. He was the director of the Mines "Las Dos Estrellas" in Tlalpujahua in the State of Michoacán, "Purísima Grande" in Real del Monte in the State of Hidalgo and "San Andrés de la Sierra" in the state of Durango. He carried out feasibility studies for the mine "La Dificultad". It was in Real del Monte where his sons Juan Pablo Aldasoro and Eduardo Aldasoro Suárez, Air Pilots members of the Early Birds of Aviation were born.

Andres Aldasoro, circa 1920.

During the last stages of General Díaz, he became Underminister of Promotion (Subsecretario de Fomento) whilst Don Bias Escontria was the Minister. He was considered as "an efficient collaborator ... who has had a brilliant career, is much esteemed in Germany, and is an expert on mining subjects, as was shown when he conducted the negotiations as to San Andres de la Sierra, Durango."
