= Brandler =

The surname Brandler may refer to "brandt" (to burn) and it is believed by the Brandler family it refers to burning wine, i.e. brandy maker. According to Hans Brandler, 1917–2011, the family tree goes back to the 1750s and has direct branches in Los Angeles, Chicago, Washington DC, Israel, Germany, and numerous other countries

- Andrew Brandler (born c. 1956), Hong Kong business executive
- Anneliese Brandler (1904–1970), German chess master
- John Brandler is an art dealer in Brentwood, Essex
- Heinrich Brandler (1881 - 1967), leader of the Communist Party of Germany and various communist opposition groups
- Markus Brandler was a judge - see the Patti Hearst Trial
- another Brandler has a climb on the Matterhorn named after him (Lothar Brandler, German mountaineer, born 1936)
