= Motorav Industria =

Motorav Industria e Comercio Ltda
- Industry: Aerospace
- Genre: Aircraft engine manufacturer
- Founded: 2012
- Headquarters: Bocaiúva, Minas Gerais, Brazil
- Website: www.motorav.com

Motorav Industria is a Brazilian aircraft engine manufacturer, located in Bocaiúva, Minas Gerais. The company builds engines for use in ultralight and homebuilt aircraft.

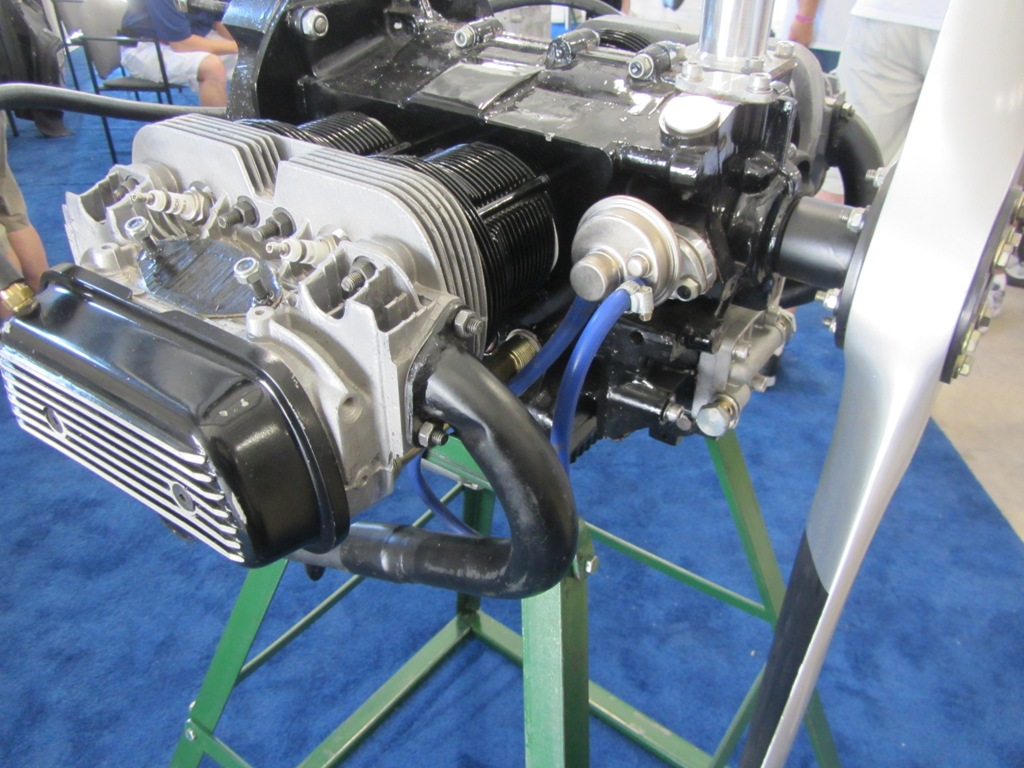
A Motorav display engine

== Aircraft Engines ==
Summary of aircraft engines built by Motorav Industria
Model name	First flight	Number built	Type
Motorav 2.3 V	2012		2.3L 80 hp
Motorav 2.6 V	2012		2.6L 95 hp
Motorav 2.6 R	2012		2.6L 95 hp
Motorav 2.8 R	2012		2.8L 105 hp
Motorav 3.1 R	2012		3.1L 115 hp

== See also ==
- AeroConversions AeroVee Engine
