= Michał Cieślak =

Michał Cieślak may refer to:

- Michał Cieślak (rowing)
- Michał Cieślak (boxer)
- Michał Cieślak (politician)
