= Lotaryov =

Lotaryov (Russian: Лотарёв) is the name of:

- Igor Severyanin (real name Igor Vasilyevich Lotaryov; 1887-1941), Russian poet
- Igor Lotaryov (born 1964), Russian middle distance runner
- Vladimir Lotaryov (1914-1994), Soviet designer of jet engines (see Ivchenko-Progress)
