= Aldasoro brothers =

Aviation pioneers

Juan Pablo Aldasoro
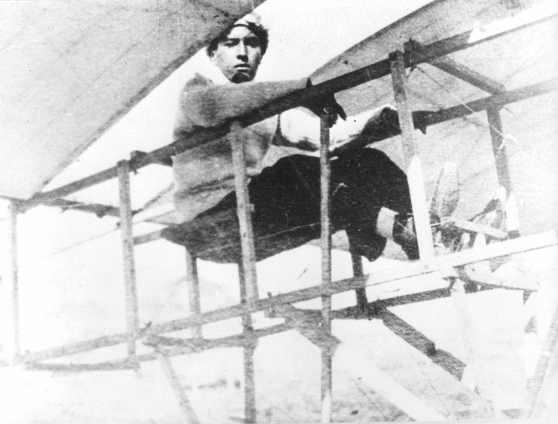
- Juan Pablo Aldasoro in his own aeroplane, 1909.
- Born: September 14, 1893; Real del Monte, Hidalgo Mexico.
- Died: October 4, 1962 (aged 69) Mexico City.
- Allegiance: Mexico
- Branch: Mexican Air Force
- Rank: Lieutenant colonel (Mexican Air Force)
- Awards: Francisco Sarabia Club Aéreo de México; American Airlines Admiral of the Fleet; Mérito Aeronáutico de Primera Clase Mexican Air force for 30 years as a pilot EMILIO CARRANZA Secretaría de Comunicaciones y Obras Públicas; Member of Legión de Honor Mexicana
- Other work: First Solo flight in 1909; First Solo flight above the Statue of Liberty in 1913; Member of the Early Birds of Aviation

Eduardo Aldasoro
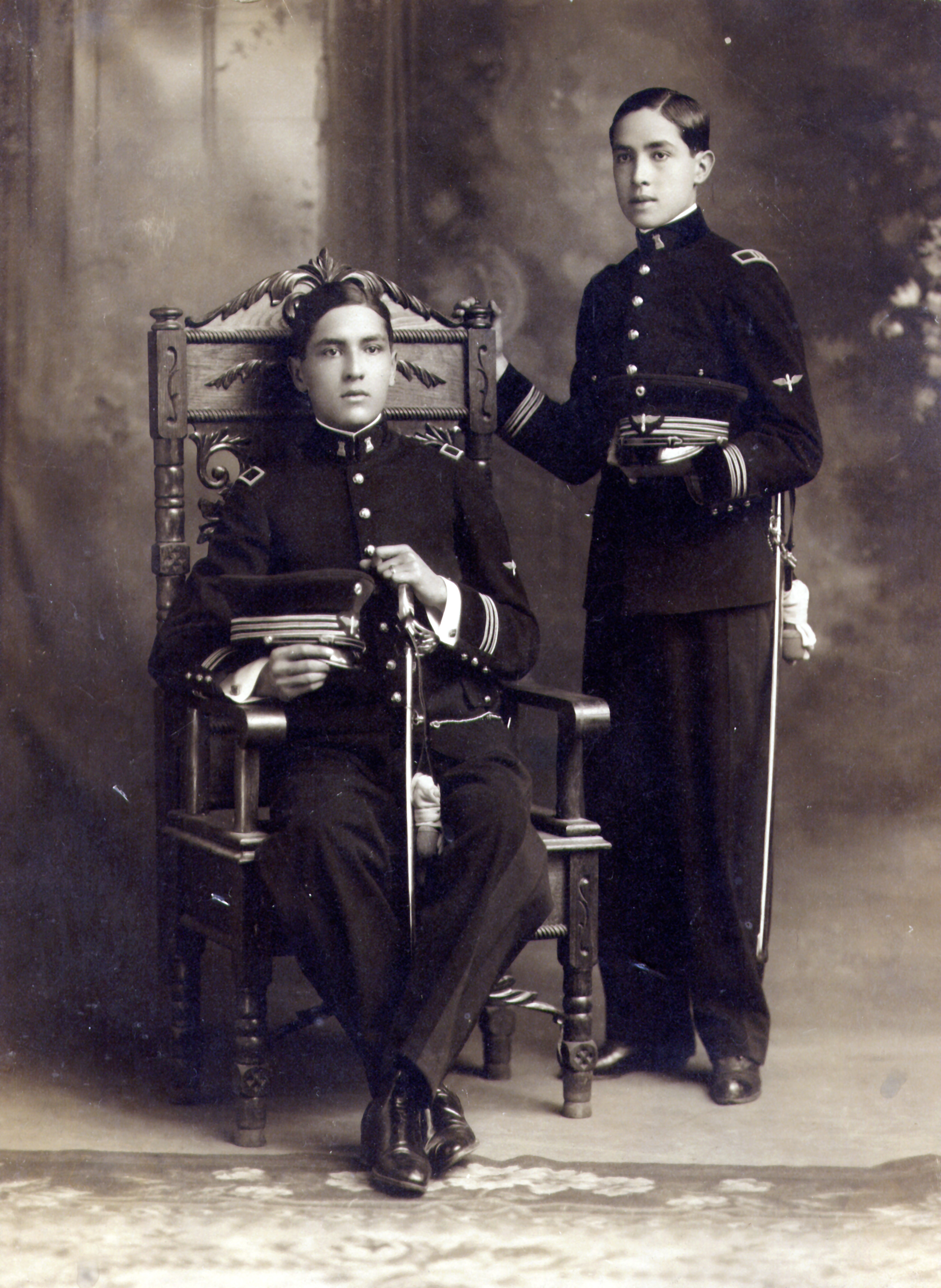
- Juan Pablo (seated) and Eduardo Aldasoro, 1915.
- Born: October 27, 1894; Real del Monte, Hidalgo Mexico.
- Died: November 10, 1968 (aged 74) Mexico City.
- Allegiance: Mexico
- Branch: Mexican Air Force
- Rank: Division General of the Mexican Air Force.
- Awards: Francisco Sarabia Club Aéreo de México; American Airlines Admiral of the Fleet; Mérito Aeronáutico de Primera Clase Mexican Air force for 30 years as a pilot EMILIO CARRANZA Secretaría de Comunicaciones y Obras Públicas; Member of Legión de Honor Mexicana; Legion of Merit (USA); Comendador de la Orden de Boyaca (Colombia); Condecoración de la Junta Interamericana de Defensas Conjunta en Washington, D.C (USA)
- Other work: Member of the Early Birds of Aviation

Juan Pablo Aldasoro Suárez (1893–1962) and Eduardo Aldasoro Suárez (1894–1968) were aviation pioneers.

== Biography ==
Juan Pablo Aldasoro was born on September 14, 1893, in the "Casa Grande" of Real of Monte, state of Hidalgo, Mexico. Eduardo was born on October 27, 1894. Their father, Andrés Aldasoro, was the Minister of Promotion under Porfirio Díaz and was later on the general manager of the "Las Dos Estrellas" mine in the state of Michoacán. Their sister, Guillermina married a surgeon, Dr. Reynaldo Escobar Castañeda.

The Aldasoro brothers alternated their studies of preparatory with their vocation being mechanics and a passion for flying through publications and magazines of those days. They inquired and researched about everything related to aviation. The inseparable brothers found a common interest.

== Deaths ==
Juan Pablo Aldasoro Suárez died on October 4, 1962, with the rank of Lieutenant Colonel Flying Pilot.

Eduardo Aldasoro Suárez died on November 10, 1968, with the rank of General Brigadier Flying Pilot.

== Legacy ==
Certificate recognizing Juan Pablo Aldasoro as a member of the Early Birds of Aviation, 1943.

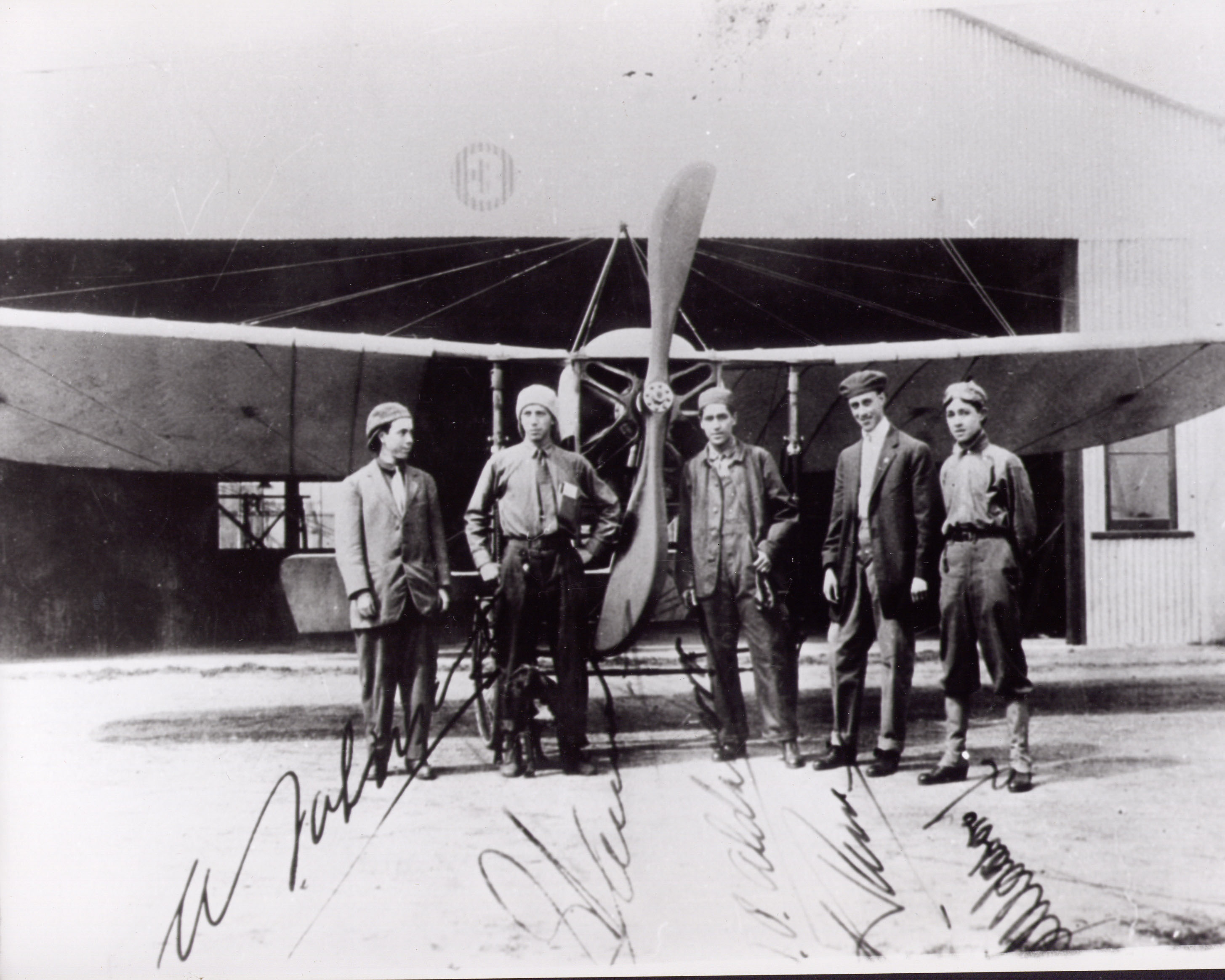
Five Mexican pilots that attended the Moissant School of aviation. From Left: Alberto Salinas Carranza, Gustavo Salinas Camiña, Juan Pablo Aldasoro Suárez, Horacio Ruiz Gaviño, Eduardo Aldasoro Suárez.

Two bases of the Mexican Air Force were named after the Aldasoro brothers:

- Military Air Base Number 4 in Cozumel, Quintana Roo is called General Eduardo Aldasoro Suarez
- Military Air Base Number 11 in Mexico City is called Teniente Coronel Juan Pablo Aldasoro Suarez

There is a street in Mexico City in the "Aviación Civil" neighborhood south of the International Airport of Mexico City. Other famous Mexican (Juan Guillermo Villasana, Horacio Ruiz, Alberto Salinas and Roberto Fierro) and international pilots (Santos Dumont, Roland Garros, Louis Bleriot, Charles Lindebergh, Alberto Braniff, Enrique Farman, Simon Audenaro) have streets in the same neighborhood.

A primary school near Tuca (Clave 15EJN0622N, Turno MATUTINO) was named "Hermanos Aldasoro".

Carlos Noriega Hope wrote a short story, "El Tesoro de Cabeza de Vaca," which was inspired during a visit to Juan Pablo Aldasoro's hacienda in the state of Jalisco in the 1920s. The story appeared in the book La inutil Curiosidad, later re-printed under the title of Las experiencias de Miss Patsy. Juan Pablo appears as himself in a fictional story of treasure hunts.
