= Poyer =

Poyer is a surname. Notable people with the surname include:

- John Poyer (died 1649), Welsh soldier
- Jordan Poyer (born 1991), American football player
- David Poyer (born 1949), American author and naval officer
