= Michael Brandner =

Michael Brandner may refer to:

- Michael Brandner (footballer) (born 1995), Austrian footballer
- Michael Brandner (actor) (born 1951), German actor
