= Ferdinand Brandner =

Austrian aerospace designer & SS officer (1903-1986)

- Born: 17 November 1903
- Died: 20 December 1986 (aged 83); Salzburg, Austria
- Engineering career
- Discipline: Aerospace engineering

Ferdinand Brandner (17 November 1903 – 20 December 1986) was an Austrian aerospace designer and an SS Standartenführer in Nazi Germany. While interned in the Soviet Union under Operation Osoaviakhim following World War II, he played a major role in designing the Kuznetsov NK-12, the most powerful turboprop engine ever built.

== Life ==
Brandner was born 17 November 1903 to Sudeten German parents in Vienna, his father being a low-ranking government official. He served in the Freikorps Oberland in 1921, and went on to study in Vienna, earning a degree in engineering in 1925. He began designing diesel engines for locomotives, working at the Humboldt-Deutz-Motoren AG in the Rhineland.

In 1930 Brandner joined the National Socialist Factory Organization and the Technical Engineers Division of the NSDAP, becoming an engineering consultant to the Austrian NSDAP in 1935. He would rise within the SS to the rank of Standartenführer.

By 1936 Brandner was working at the Junkers-Motorenbau factory in Dessau designing aircraft engines, and eventually assisted with the war effort for Germany.

In the spring of 1945, Brandner was captured by the Soviet Red Army trying to flee to Prague near the end of World War II. He was flown to Moscow as part of Operation Osoaviakhim, where he was assigned to work with Nikolai Dmitriyevich Kuznetsov. Eventually the Soviets dismantled the Junkers factory in Dessau and the BMW factory in Stassfurt, moving them to Kuibyshev in the Soviet Union.

Longing to escape communism, he was released from the Soviet Union in 1953, where he returned to Austria. He began working at Maschinenfabrik Andritz AG as the technical director. From there he became managing director at BMW Aircraft Engines.

In 1959, Brandner left Europe for Egypt, where the government was recruiting German World War II scientists for their top-secret aerospace program. His project was codenamed "135", with the duty of designing a jet engine for a fighter already constructed. In 1962, the presence of German scientists in Egypt was exposed in the world press, leading to a regional crisis from Israel to Germany.

In 1972–1973, he worked as a professor in People's Republic of China giving lectures on engine construction.

Brandner died on 20 December 1986 in Salzburg.

== Aerospace design ==
=== German designs ===
==== Jumo 222 ====
Begun in 1937, Brandner and his team received an order for the development of the Jumo 222 engine, with a horsepower of 3000, where it was eventually sent into production in 1941.

==== Ju-288 ====
His design team was responsible for the Ju-288, designated a top priority by the Reichsluftfahrtministerium in 1941.

=== Soviet designs ===
==== RD-10 ====
Brandner and his team recreated the Jumo 004, which they had begun working on in 1944 in Germany, becoming known under its Soviet name as the RD-10.

==== Jumo 012 ====
In 1947, following demands from the Soviet hierarchy, Brandner and his team reconstructed the Jumo 012, a powerful engine they had begun working on during the war in Germany. In 1948, they had completed the construction, but production was halted.

==== TW-2/NK-4 ====
After work on the 012 was halted, design and construction of the 6,000 horsepower Jumo 022 began, with Brandner overseeing construction of the project. This project's Soviet name was the TW-2 and NK-4. The engine passed a state-examination in October 1950. This engine paved the way for the TV-022 and 2TV-2F.

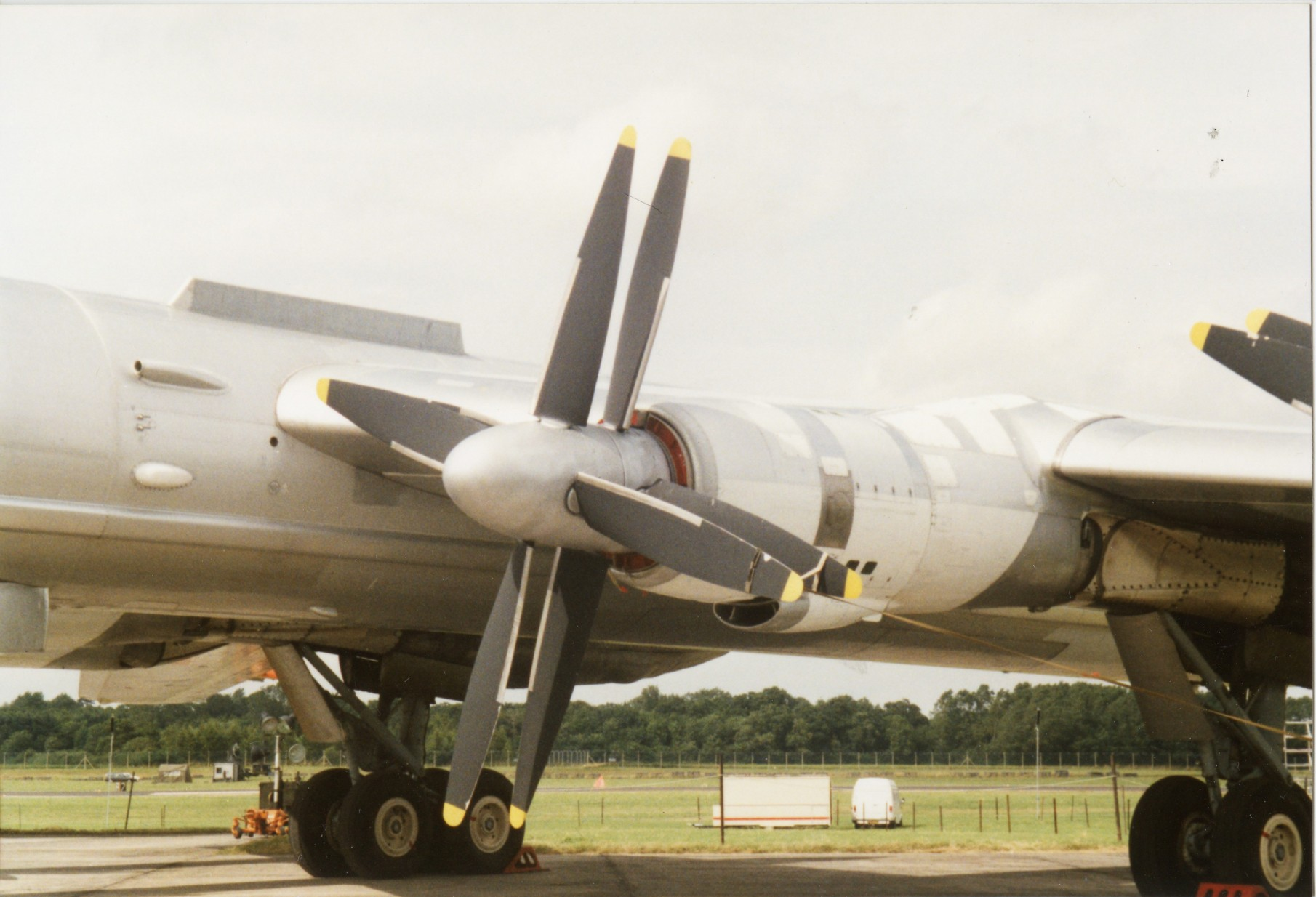
NK-12M turboprop engine on a Tupolev Tu-95 at the RIAT, Fairford, 1993.

==== NK-12 ====
Brandner headed a team which then focused their attention on a new Soviet demand, a 12,000 horsepower engine which would become known as the Kuznetsov NK-12. This engine was first tested in 1953, and had successful performances, being placed in the Tupolev Tu-95 initially.

===== Soviet legacy =====
Brandner's work in the USSR set the standard for Soviet heavy turboprop production and ultimately under his leadership the world's most powerful turboprop aircraft engine was born, the Kuznetsov NK-12.

=== Egyptian designs ===
The Brandner E-300 was a jet engine designed to power the Helwan HA-300 jet fighter being produced by the Egyptian government.
