= Kamala Nehru Park, Mumbai =

Park in Hanging Gardens Complex, Mumbai

Coordinates: 18°57′18″N 72°48′18″E

Kamala Nehru Park is part of the Hanging Gardens complex in Mumbai, Maharashtra, India covering an area of approximate 16,000 sq.mt. (4 acres). Located at the top of Mumbai's Malabar Hill, it is developed and maintained by the Hydraulic Engineer's Department of Municipal Corporation of Greater Mumbai. One of Mumbai's premier gardens it is popular with young children and tourists. The garden has views of the Marine drive below – also known as Queen's necklace.

The shoe structure is inspired by the nursery rhyme There was an Old Woman Who Lived in a Shoe.

Soli Arceivala, former BMC environment officer, VJTI vice principal of 15 years, NEERI director had designed Old Woman's Shoe at Kamala Nehru Park.

== History ==
Established in 1952, Kamala Nehru Park has been an integral part of Mumbai's urban landscape for decades. The park is named in honor of Kamala Nehru, a freedom fighter and the wife of Jawaharlal Nehru, who played a significant role in India's struggle for independence.

=== Renovation ===
In 2017 and 2018, the park was rejuvenated and opened for public on 22 February 2018 by the Municipal Corporation of Greater Mumbai.

Continuing the theme of 'Nursery Rhymes' the park now has additional spaces designed on various other nursery rhymes in Marathi, Hindi and English.

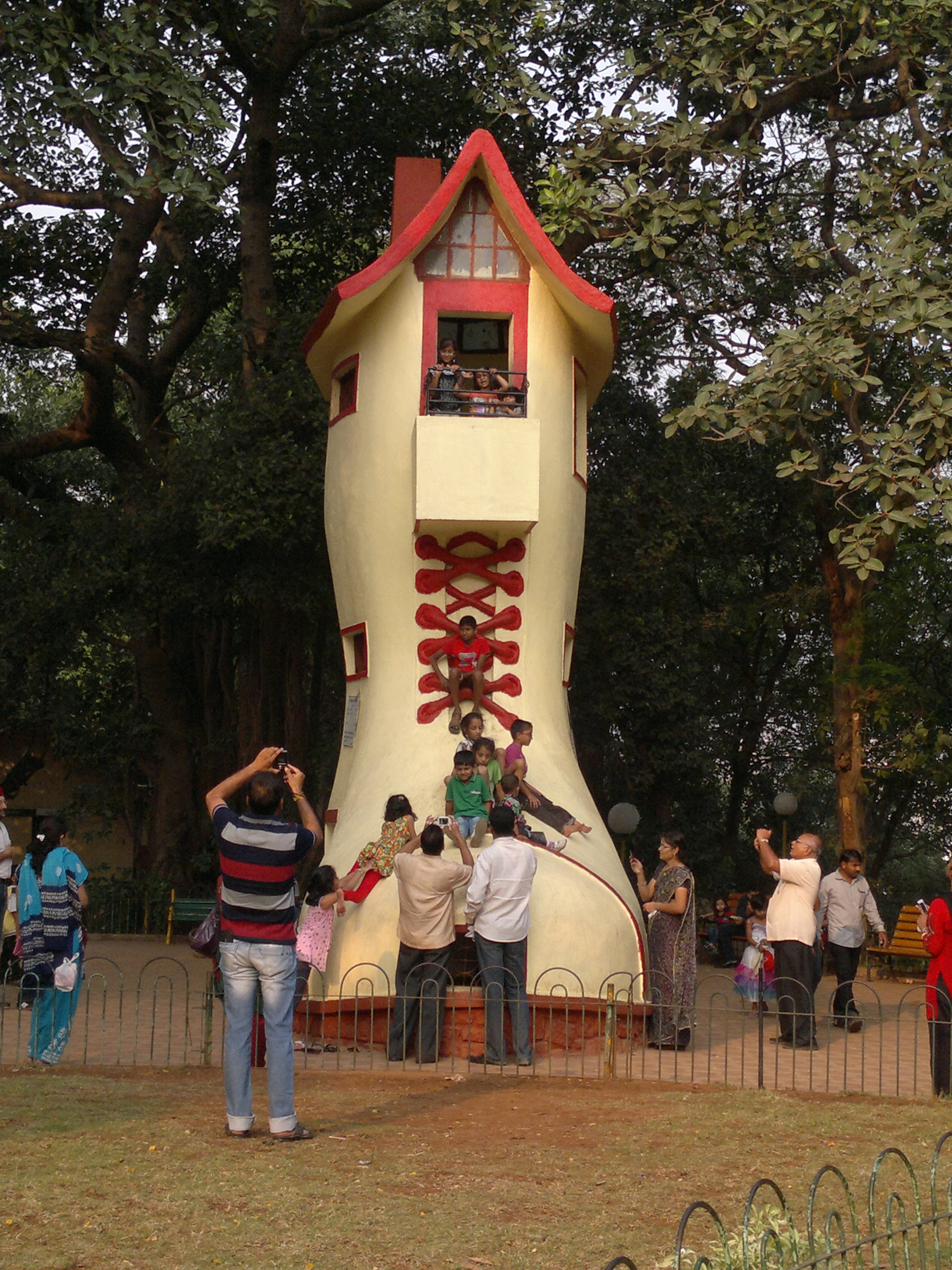
Old Woman's Shoe in 2000
