= Branner =

Branner may refer to:

== People ==
- Hans Christian Branner (1903–1966), Danish author
- John Casper Branner (1850–1922), U.S. geologist and President of Stanford University
- Martin Branner (1888–1970), U.S. cartoonist and vaudevillian
- Robert Branner (1927–1973), U.S. art historian

== Buildings ==
- Branner-Hicks House, National Register historic building in Jefferson City, Tennessee; named after Benjamin Manassah Branner
- Branner Hall, a student dormitory at Stanford University; named after John Casper Branner

== Other ==
- Branner Earth Sciences Library, one of Stanford University's library collections, named after John Casper Branner
