= Elda Miriam Aldasoro Maya =

Mexican biologist, anthropologist

Elda Miriam Aldasoro Maya is a Mexican biologist, anthropologist and popularizer. She is a pioneer in the study of ethnoentomology in Mexico and of interdisciplinary research that uses theoretical approaches from biology and anthropology to study ethnobiology from a political, economic, social and cultural perspective. Her work has contributed to the documentation of indigenous knowledge, the promotion of activities around community development, the implementation and design of participatory methodologies, as well as biocultural education activities.

She has taught at the National Autonomous University of Mexico (UNAM), University of Washington, University of the Valley of Mexico, and at the Intercultural Universities of the State of Mexico. She has also been a collaborator of the CONACyT Network of Ethnoecology and Cultural Heritage, and a consultant in the field of microfinance for work with indigenous peoples.

She is currently a CONACYT chair at the Colegio de la Frontera Sur (ECOSUR) in Villahermosa and a member of the national system of researchers of CONACYT Mexico.

== Career ==
She obtained a bachelor's degree in biology from the Iztacala Faculty of Higher Studies of the National Autonomous University of Mexico conducting one of the first investigations in Hñä hñu (Otomi) ethnoentomology in the Mezquital Valley in Mexico. She then studied a master's degree at the Environmental Anthropology Program at the University of Washington, she also obtained her Ph. Tlahuicas through a participatory research project in which it offers novel models for the study of ethnobiology.

During 2012 to 2014 she worked as a consultant in the field of microfinance for work with indigenous peoples for the development and international trade company DAI.

In 2014 she obtained the CONACYT chair to work on the project "Massification of Agroecology" in the Department of Agriculture, Society and Environment of the Colegio de la Frontera Sur (ECOSUR) in Villahermosa; where she currently works.

In 2015, she was coordinator of the declaration of the Latin American ethnobiological meeting of women (EELAM) that sought to recognize, make visible and protect the contribution of Latin American women to the knowledge of the use of biological resources.
