= Noel Penny Turbines =

Noel Penny Turbines was a British company that produced small jet engines, most notably the Noel Penny NPT301. It was established in Coventry in 1972 by Noel Penny, a former designer and chief engineer from Rover Gas Turbines in Solihull. The company employed hundreds of engineers at its works at Siskin Drive, Tollbar End in Coventry over a period of two decades. It eventually went into receivership in 1991, with the rights to the engine designs being sold off.

In the 1970s, Noel Penny Turbines undertook secretive contract work for the American company, Caterpillar Inc. in the design of engines for heavy vehicles and trucks.
