= VIJA Aircraft Engines =

French aircraft engine manufacturer

- Company type: Limited liability company
- Industry: Aerospace
- Founded: 2004
- Defunct: 2018
- Fate: Out of business
- Headquarters: Toulouse, France
- Products: Aircraft engines
- Number of employees: 2
- Website: http://www.vija-engines.com

VIJA Aircraft Engines was a French engineering company that designed and built engines for ultralight aircraft use.

By 2015 the company website had been taken down and the company seemed to have ceased business then.

The company was reported in 2017 to be looking for a buyer, but was finally closed in 2018.

== History ==
The company was founded by two brothers, Vincent and Jacques Trincal, hence the company name, VI-JA. They were motorcycle enthusiasts and sought to apply motorcycle engine technology to ultralight aircraft. They decided to adapt the engine from the Suzuki Bandit 1200, formerly the Suzuki GSX-R1100, for aviation use. The brothers started the company as a family owned limited liability company. The first showed a prototype at the Salon de Blois airshow in 2004 and had a first almost fully functional engine at Blois in 2005. Their project did not attract investments or qualify for bank loans and it was entirely funded by the family to €100,000.

The first engine flew in an Aero Synergie J300 Joker testbed and produced 90 hp (67 kW) at 5700 rpm. Initial climb was 900 ft/min (4.5 m/s) and a cruise speed of 90 mph (145 km/h), consuming 2 U.S. gallons (7.6 L; 1.7 imp gal) per hour.

== Engines ==
- VIJA J-10Si
- VIJA J-10Sbi
- VIJA AG-12Si
- VIJA AG-12Sbi
- VIJA J-16Ti
