= Brandner E-300 =

Egyptian turbojet engine

E-300
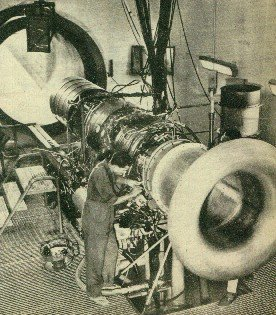
- Egyptian E-300 engine undergoing testing
- Type: Turbojet
- National origin: Egypt
- Manufacturer: Egyptian General Aero Organisation
- Major applications: Helwan HA-300

The Brandner E-300 was an Egyptian turbojet engine, developed for the Helwan HA-300 light jet fighter.

== Development ==
Austrian engineer Ferdinand Brandner, who had worked in the Soviet Union, leading the development of the Kuznetsov NK-12 turboprop, the powerplant of the Tupolev Tu-95 bomber, moved to Egypt to lead a team to design an engine to power the Helwan HA-300 jet fighter that was simultaneously being designed by a team of Germans led by Willy Messerschmitt.

The new engine underwent bench testing in 1963, and was flight tested under the wing of an Antonov An-12, before being installed in a HAL HF-24 Marut for high speed testing, in which form it flew on 29 March 1967. The E-300 was installed in the third HA-300 prototype (the first two were powered by Bristol Siddeley Orpheus engines), but testing stopped in the taxi-test stage before flight tests. The programme of HA-300 was abandoned in May 1969.

== Variants ==
E-300-A
Military version for HA-300
E-300-C1
Civil version of E-300-A, proposed for Project 206 three-engined airliner.
E-300-C2
Proposed growth version of E-300-C1.
E-300-AF
Projected turbofan development.

== Specifications (variant) ==
Data from Jane's All The World's Aircraft 1969-70

==== General characteristics ====
- Type: Afterburning turbojet
- Length: 4,300 mm (169.3 in)
- Diameter: 840 mm (33 in)
- Dry weight: 860 kg (1,896 lb)

==== Components ====
- Compressor: nine-stage axial compressor
- Combustors: can-annular combustion chamber
- Turbine: two-stage axial turbine

==== Performance ====
- Maximum thrust: 32.4kN (6,275 lbf) dry, 47.2 kN (10,582 lbf) with reheat
- Overall pressure ratio: 6:1
- Thrust-to-weight ratio: 3.310 dry, 5.581 with reheat

== Bibliography ==
- Taylor, John W. R. Jane's All The World's Aircraft 1969-70. London:Jane's Yearbooks, 1969.
