= List of food and drink awards =

This list of food and drink awards is an index of articles of notable awards given for food and drinks. Food awards include awards for restaurants and food products, and cooking competitions. There are wine and spirits awards, beer awards, awards for cookbooks, and awards for food technology.

== Food ==
=== Restaurants ===
Country	Award	Sponsor	Notes
Australia	Australian Good Food Guide Chef Hat Award	Australian Good Food Guide	oldest food award in Australia
United Kingdom	British Kebab Awards	CEFTUS	Local kebab restaurants across the UK
United Kingdom	Curry Awards	The Curry Club	Curry restaurants in the United Kingdom which have achieved "total excellence" in all departments
India	Guwahati Food Awards	G Plus	Superior services and achievements in the Food and Beverage industry of Guwahati, India
United States	Hale Aina Awards	Honolulu magazine	Hawaii dining awards
United States	James Beard Foundation Award	James Beard Foundation	Chefs, restaurateurs, authors and journalists
Ireland, United States	James Joyce Pub Award	Bloomsday Publications	Pubs in Ireland and the United States deemed as 'Authentic' Irish pubs on Bloomsday in the year 2000
France	La Liste	La Liste	Ranking and restaurants guide
France, United Kingdom	Les Routiers	Les Routiers	Travel guide books for eating out and hotels
France	Michelin Guide	Michelin	Hotel and restaurant guide books with ratings
Thailand	Shell Chuan Chim	Thanadsri Svasti	Thai food guide
United Kingdom	The British Curry Awards	Enam Ali	Various awards
United Kingdom	The World's 50 Best Restaurants	William Reed Business Media	List based on a poll of international chefs, restaurateurs, gourmands and restaurant critics
United Kingdom	Tiffin Cup	Tiffin Club	Best South Asian restaurant in the United Kingdom

=== Food products ===
Region	Award	Sponsor	Notes
United States	Cup of Excellence	Alliance for Coffee Excellence	To identify the highest quality coffees produced
United States	Good Food Awards	Good Food Retailers Collaborative	Foods that are "tasty, authentic, and responsibly produced
United Kingdom	Great Taste Award	Guild of Fine Food awards	Producers and sellers of 'artisan food and drink' in Britain
United Kingdom	Sammies	British Sandwich Association	For sandwich manufacturers and retailers
United Kingdom	The FAB Awards	The FAB Awards	International awards for food and beverage brands
Netherlands	A.A. Taste Award	Anti Additive Association	Awards for less or non-additive food and beverage brands
Canada	Salt Lick Award	Canadian Stroke Network, Obesity Canada, Advanced Foods and Materials Network	Canadian manufacturers of foods with high sodium levels
Belgium	Monde Selection	International Institute for Quality Selections	International quality awards programme for consumer products since 1961
Belgium	Superior Taste Award	International Taste Institute	Sensory evaluation and certification of consumer food & drink products

=== Competitions ===
Country	Award	Sponsor	Notes
Mexico	International Pasty Festival	State of Hidalgo	Celebrating the pasty
United States	The Food Network Awards	Food Network	TV awards to chefs, cities, restaurants, and other notable food related institutions
United States	New York International Olive Oil Competition	Olive Oil Times	Extra virgin olive oil competition
Australia	World Brewer's Cup	World Brewer's Cup	Coffee brewing
United Kingdom	World Pasty Championships	Cornish Pasty Association	Awards are given to amateurs, professionals, juniors and companies
United Kingdom	World Porridge Making Championship	Carrbridge Community Council	Porridge

=== Other ===
Country	Award	Sponsor	Notes
United Kingdom	Food Photographer of the Year	The Food Awards Company	Photography
United States	Captain Edward F. Ney Memorial Award	Secretary of the Navy, International Food Service Executives Association	Food-service in US Navy galleys
United Kingdom	Restaurant & Bar Design Awards	Restaurant & Bar Design Awards	Design and architecture of food and beverage spaces internationally

== Wine and spirits ==
Country	Award	Sponsor	Notes
Australia	Australian Distilled Spirits Awards	Royal Agricultural Society of Victoria	
Australia	Bushing Monarch	McLaren Vale Wine Show	Highest scoring individual wine
United Kingdom	Decanter World Wine Awards	Decanter magazine	World's biggest wine competition
Canada	International Value Wine Awards	Wine Access magazine	Finest value wines in the world available to Canadians
United Kingdom	International Wine and Spirit Competition	International Wine & Spirit Competition	Wine and spirit competition
Australia	Jimmy Watson Memorial Trophy	Royal Agricultural Society of Victoria	Best one- or two-year-old, dry, red wine
United States	Los Angeles International Competitions	Los Angeles International Competitions	Wine, Spirits, Beer, and Olive Oil
United States	Mazer Cup	Mazer Cup International	Mead competition
Belgium	Monde Selection	International Institute for Quality Selections	Food, drinks, and cosmetics products
United States	San Francisco World Spirits Competition	Anthony Dias Blue	
Italy	Vinitaly awards	Vinitaly	Wine competition and exposition

== Beer awards ==
Country	Award	Sponsor	Notes
Australia	Australian International Beer Awards	Royal Agricultural Society of Victoria	
Brazil	Brazilian Beer Festival	ABRADEG	
United States	Brewers Association Awards	Brewers Association	
United Kingdom	Brewing Industry International Awards	Brewing Technology Services	
United Kingdom	Champion Beer of Britain	Campaign for Real Ale	
United Kingdom	Champion Beer of Scotland	Campaign for Real Ale	
United Kingdom	Champion Beer of Wales	Campaign for Real Ale	
United Kingdom	Champion Winter Beer of Britain	Campaign for Real Ale	
Germany	European Beer Star	Private Brauereien Deutschland, Private Brauereien Bayern and SIB	
Canada	Golden Tap Awards	The Bar Towel	
United States	Great American Beer Festival	Brewers Association	
United States	World Beer Cup	Brewers Association	

== Literary awards ==
Country	Award	Sponsor	Notes
United States	Cordon D'Or	Cordon d'Or	Cookbook authors and chefs worldwide
United States	Jane Grigson Award	International Association of Culinary Professionals	Distinguished scholarship and depth of research in cookbooks
United Kingdom	Glenfiddich Food and Drink Awards	William Grant & Sons	Achievements in writing, publishing and broadcasting on the subjects of food and drink
United States	IACP Awards	International Association of Culinary Professionals award	Cookbook writing and publishing
Italy	Langhe Ceretto Prize	Langhe Ceretto	Books dealing with food and viticulture

== Food technology awards ==
Country	Award	Sponsor	Notes
United States	Babcock-Hart Award	Institute of Food Technologists	Significant contributions in food technology that resulted in public health through some aspects of nutrition
United States	Bernard L. Oser Award	Institute of Food Technologists	Scientific knowledge of food ingredient safety or for leadership in establishing principles for food safety evaluation or regulation
United States	Bor S. Luh International Award	Institute of Food Technologists	Individual or institution that had outstanding efforts in food technology
United States	Calvert L. Willey Award	Institute of Food Technologists	Meritorious and imaginative service to IFT
United States	Carl R. Fellers Award	Institute of Food Technologists	Achievements in areas other than research, development, education, and technology transfer
United States	Elizabeth Fleming Stier Award	Institute of Food Technologists	Humanitarian ideals and unselfish dedication to the well-being of the food industry, academia, students, or the general public
United States	Food Technology Industrial Achievement Award	Institute of Food Technologists	Development of an outstanding food process or product that represents a significant advance in the application of food technology to food production
United States	IFT Industrial Scientist Award	Institute of Food Technologists	Scientists who made technical contributions to advancing the food industry
United States	IFT Research & Development Award	Institute of Food Technologists	Scientists who have made recent and significant research and development contributions to the understanding of food science, food technology, or nutrition
United States	Marcel Loncin Research Prize	Institute of Food Technologists	Basic chemistry, physics, and/or engineering research applied to food processing and improving food quality.
United States	Myron Solberg Award	Institute of Food Technologists	Leadership in establishing, successfully developing, and continuing a cooperative organization involving academia, government, and industry
United States	Nicolas Appert Award	Institute of Food Technologists	Preeminence in and contributions to the field of food technology
United States	Samuel Cate Prescott Award	Institute of Food Technologists	Food science or technology researchers who are under 36 years of age
United States	Stephen S. Chang Award for Lipid or Flavor Science	Institute of Food Technologists	Significant contributions to lipid or flavor science
United States	William V. Cruess Award	Institute of Food Technologists	Teaching in food science and technology
United States	World Food Prize	World Food Prize Foundation	Outstanding achievement in advancement of human development through improved food quality, quantity, or availability

== See also ==
- Lists of awards
