= Food competition =

Competition between food or drinks

Food or drink competitions reward products primarily for their "gustative worth" in the form of an award or a medal. These competitions can be classified into different categories, and most awards are product-specific, such as for wines, beers, and cheeses. Others focus on local, regional and/or national products. Finally, the international competitions test all kinds of foods and drinks available to consumers on a retail basis. Wine is probably the most tested drink, followed by beer and spirits.

There is a variety of such food and drink competitions worldwide, where the taste and quality of products are assessed. Most evaluations are carried out blind, sometimes complemented by laboratory analysis. The jury usually consists of a panel of different types of "experts" in tastings such as chefs or sommeliers.

The history of degustation tests is unclear; however, one of the earliest taste awards recorded for drinks is the Brewing Industry International Awards, dating back to 1888. For food, Monde Selection is the oldest award recorded, first run in 1961. Since then, as the variety of food products on the market has grown, so has the number of competitions and evaluations.

Monde Selection states that "This bronze, silver, gold or grand gold quality label can be compared to the quality stars of a hotel or those of the Michelin Guide." However, whilst both processes are anonymous, Michelin chooses the hotels and restaurants it reviews and pays for everything. Only products who pay the Euro 1,100 entry fee are reviewed by Monde Selection. Unlike Olympic gold, silver and bronze medals, where only one of each is awarded per event, there are no limits to how many can be awarded in each category. Other competitions use a similar business model.

Most awarding organizations charge an entry fee. Alternatively, for some awards, producers or retailers pay a fee only if their products are awarded and/or they decide to communicate about the award (payment for the right to show the award on packaging).

In both cases, one might think that these recognitions can be bought. However, tastings are carried out independently and are blind-tested, where judges focus exclusively on sensory (organoleptic) features, such as taste, olfaction, vision, aspect, mouth-feel, after-taste, without being influenced by packaging, branding or marketing. Of course, only producers who pay the entry fee can make use of any award made.

== Competitions ==
These are all pay to enter:

- International Wine Contest
- The Great Aussie Pie Competition
- Monde Selection
- New York International Olive Oil Competition
- Superior Taste Award
- World Beer Cup
- A.A. Taste Award

== See also ==
- Wine competition
- Wine tasting
- List of food and drink awards
