= List of oldest olive trees =

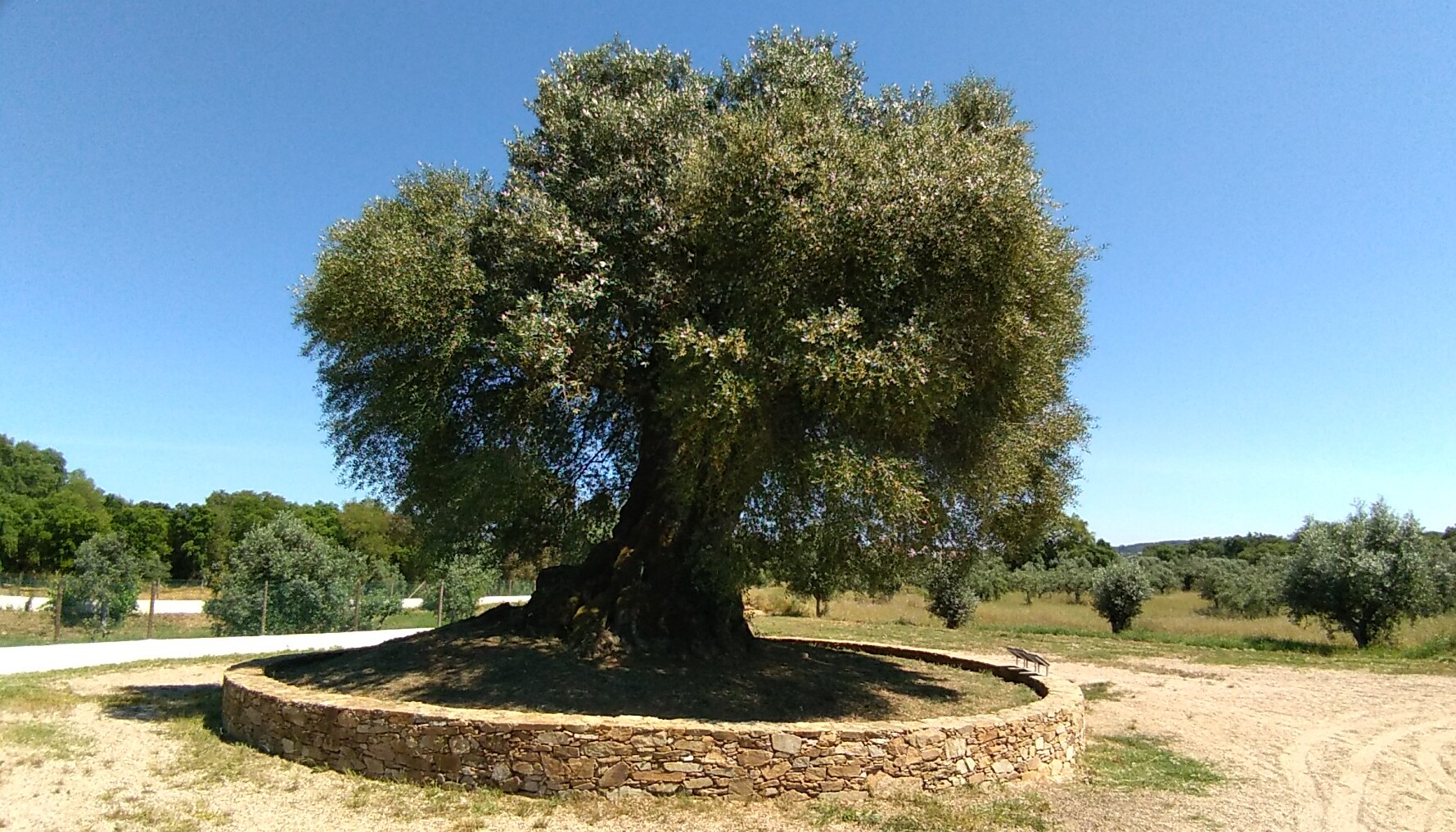
The Oliveira de Mouchão in Mouriscas, Abrantes, Portugal, has a claimed age of 3,350 years.

Olive trees can live for over 1,000 years. Some trees around the Mediterranean basin are claimed to be far older, including those listed here.

== Ancient olive trees ==
- An olive tree in Mouriscas, Abrantes, Portugal, Oliveira do Mouchão, is one of the oldest olive trees, with an estimated age of 3,350 years.
- An olive tree in the city of Bar in Montenegro has an estimated age of between 2,014 and 2,480 years.
- An olive tree on the island of Brijuni in Croatia has a radiocarbon dating age of about 1,600 years. It still gives fruit (about 30 kg or 66 lb per year), which is made into olive oil.
- An olive tree in west Athens, named Plato's Olive Tree, is thought to be a remnant of the grove where Plato's Academy was situated, making it an estimated 2,400 years old. The tree consisted of a cavernous trunk from which a few branches were still sprouting in 1975 when a traffic accident caused a bus to uproot it.
- The age of an olive tree in Crete, the Finix Olive, is claimed to be more than 2,000 years, based on archaeological evidence around the tree.
- The olive tree of Vouves in Crete has an age estimated at between 2,000 and 4,000 years.
- An olive tree called Farga d'Arió in Ulldecona, Catalonia, Spain, has been estimated (with laser-perimetry methods) to date back to 314 AD, which would mean that it was planted when Constantine the Great was Roman emperor.
- Some Italian olive trees are believed to date back to Ancient Rome (8th century BC to 5th century AD), although identifying progenitor trees in ancient sources is difficult. There are other trees about 1,000 years old in the same gardens. The 15th-century trees of Olivo della Linza, at Alliste in the Province of Lecce in Apulia on the Italian mainland, were noted by Bishop Ludovico de Pennis during his pastoral visit to the Diocese of Nardò-Gallipoli in 1452.
- The village of Bcheale, Lebanon, claims to have the oldest olive trees in the world (4000 BC for the oldest), but no scientific study conclusively supports these claims. Research published in 2024 determined that at least one tree was over 1,100 years, while most others were around 500 years old. Trees in the towns of Amioun appear to be at least 1,500 years old.
- Several trees in the Garden of Gethsemane (from the Hebrew words gat shemanim or olive press) in Jerusalem are claimed to date back to the time of Jesus. A study conducted by the National Research Council of Italy in 2012 used carbon dating on older parts of the trunks of three trees from Gethsemane and came up with the dates of 1092, 1166 and 1198 AD, while DNA tests show that the trees were originally planted from the same parent plant. According to molecular analysis, the tested trees showed the same allelic profile at all microsatellite loci analyzed, which furthermore may indicate attempt to keep the lineage of an older species intact. However, Bernabei writes, "All the tree trunks are hollow inside so that the central, older wood is missing... In the end, only three from a total of eight olive trees could be successfully dated. The dated ancient olive trees do not, however, allow any hypothesis to be made with regard to the age of the remaining five giant olive trees." Babcox concludes, "The roots of the eight oldest trees are possibly much older. Visiting guides to the garden often state that they are two thousand years old."
- The 2,000-year-old Bidni olive trees on Malta, which have been confirmed through carbon dating, have been protected since 1933 and are listed in UNESCO's Database of National Cultural Heritage Laws. In 2011, after recognising their historical and landscape value, and in recognition of the fact that "only 20 trees remain from 40 at the beginning of the 20th century", Maltese authorities declared the ancient Bidni olive grove at Bidnija as a Tree Protected Area.
- The Al-Mihras olive trees of Jordan represent an ancient genetic lineage, with some specimens exceeding 1,000 years in age. Genomic sequencing identifies the cultivar as a potential ancestor to modern European varieties like Frantoio and Manzanilla, while its single-nucleotide polymorphisms contribute to high oleic acid content and climate resilience. In 2024, the Al-Mihras trees were recognised by UNESCO for its historical and cultural significance.
Ancient olive trees

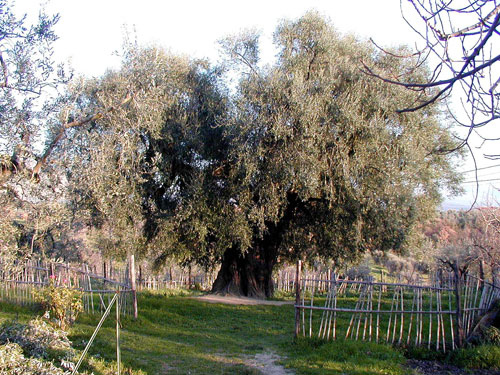
Canneto Sabino, Italy

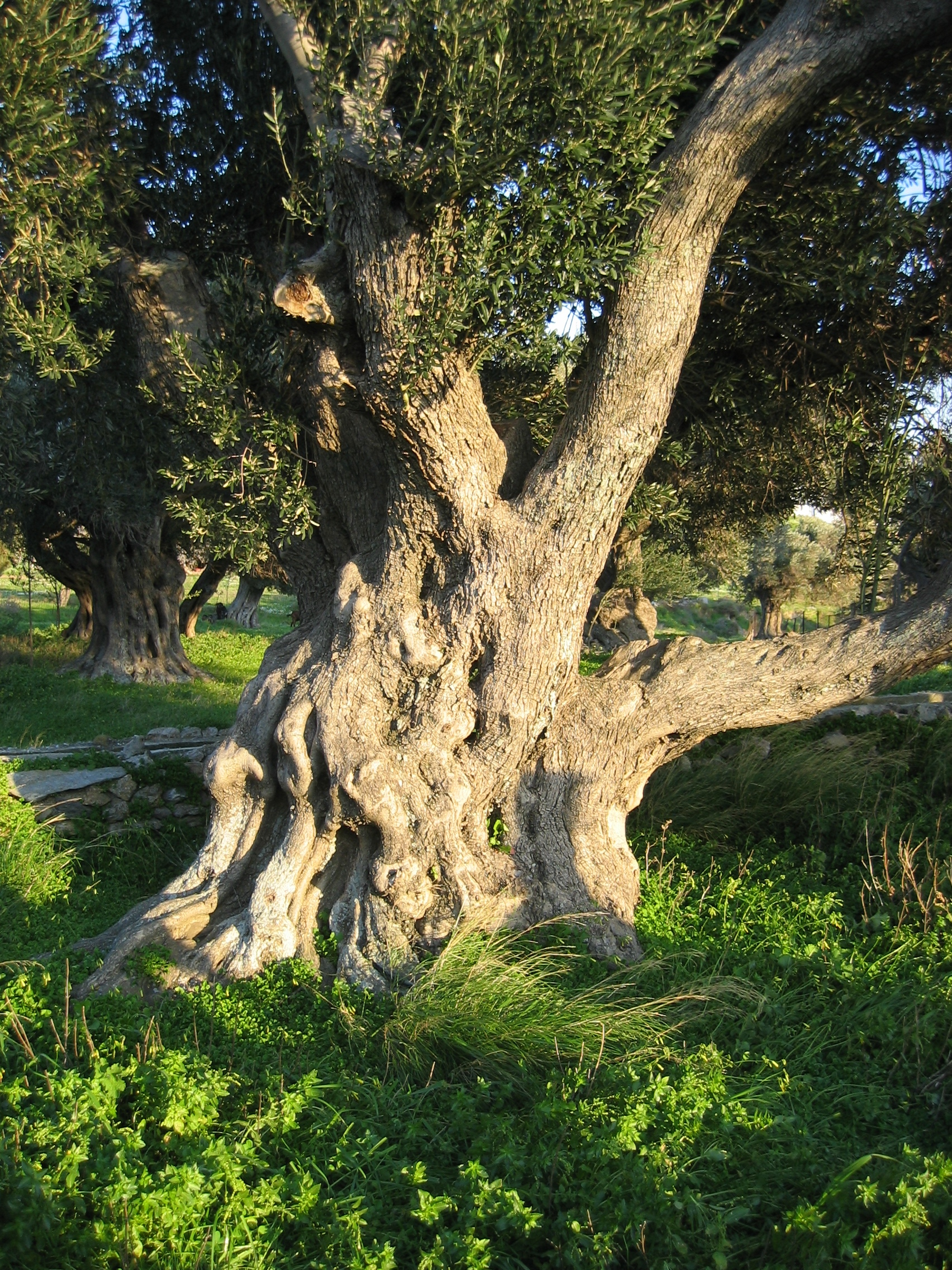
Karystos, Euboea, Greece

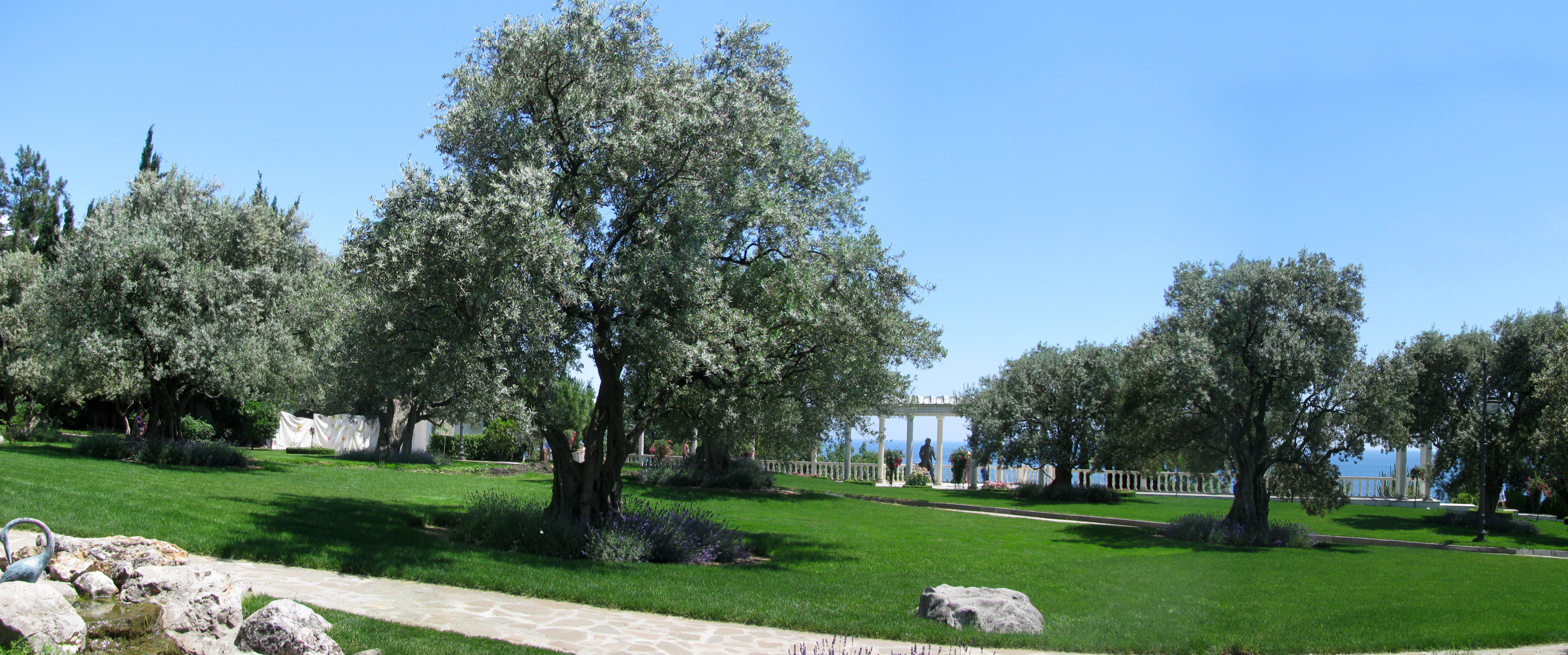
Partenit, Ukraine
