= National Pie Day =

Celebration of pies

2014 National Pie Day/Labor Day tie-in poster

National Pie Day is a celebration of pies that occurs annually in the United States on January 23. It started in the mid-1970s by Boulder, Colorado, teacher Charlie Papazian after he declared his own birthday, January 23, to be National Pie Day. Since 1986, National Pie Day is sponsored by the American Pie Council.

In 2014, the American Pie Council partnered with Paramount Pictures in promoting the romantic thriller film Labor Day in conjunction with National Pie Day. A pie-making scene features prominently in the film, and the film's general release was within a few days of National Pie Day.

The APC distributed a promotional poster to pie shops and bakeries featuring images of the film's stars Kate Winslet, Josh Brolin, and Gattlin Griffith in the pie-making scene. The poster is captioned, in part, "It makes the time we spend together, just a little sweeter. Pie. Grab a slice of life."

Notwithstanding any problematic overtones, though, Variety's take on the scene was that "What damage [the 1999 film] American Pie did for the pie industry, Labor Day has reversed."

== See also ==
- List of food days
- British Pie Week, 4–10 March
