= Pat Chapman (food writer) =

English food writer

Patrick Lawrence Chapman (20 December 1940 – 22 July 2022) was an English food writer, broadcaster and author, best known for founding The Curry Club. He wrote many books about curries.

== Early life ==
Chapman was born in London on 20 December 1940. His father was in the Merchant Navy and his mother was a midwifery training sister at Queen Charlotte's Hospital London, and then ran a maternity nursing home in Ealing. He was educated at Bedales School, where he spent time on what the school called "Outdoor Work" at the school's farm, working in the piggery and dairy.

He took a course at the Royal Central School of Speech and Drama. He began his career working backstage in London theatres, moving on to stage management at the Belgrade Theatre Coventry. He trained as a jet pilot in the Royal Air Force. He then worked for six years on sales and marketing at Lesney Products, going to night school at Enfield Tech for Business Studies and a Diploma from the Chartered Institute of Marketing. He was then accepted as a mature student at Fitzwilliam College, University of Cambridge reading economics. At the same time he started the stage lighting and sound company, Entec, providing lighting for Cambridge May Balls in 1968, and liquid light shows for BBC Television in 1970 and 1971. During the 1970s, the company provided lighting and sound systems for numerous rock music bands. In 1979, Chapman's investor, the Marquee Club's Harold Pendleton, took over Entec. Chapman moved to Haslemere, Surrey, and spent the next four years as a consultant to entertainment groups on lighting and sound systems.

Chapman inherited a family interest in India, and curry in particular. He visited the subcontinent more than 40 times, and set up the Curry Club.

== Career ==
Chapman frequently demonstrated curry, held regular curry cookery courses and took small groups of curry enthusiasts to India to visit a region and sample its cuisine. From 2008, Chapman was an active member of the Army Benevolent Fund committee, specifically to help with fund-raising for their annual Big Curry event.

For the 2010 National Curry Week celebrations he was commissioned by Cobra Beer to create recipes which add spice to top British Regional favourite dishes.

From 2012 he was a trustee of the Cobra Foundation, an independent charity supported my Molson Coors and Cobra Beer to distribute funds to young people in South Asia by providing health, education, community support.

Chapman appeared on British television many times, including on the shows Who'll Do The Pudding?, This Morning, Food and Drink, Great Food Live and Good Food Live. He had a regular spot on the Good Morning with Anne and Nick show.

== Awards ==
On 17 November 2019, Chapman was awarded a Lifetime Achievement Award at the Asian Curry Awards from the Asian Catering Federation, of which he is the longstanding Chairman of Judges. However, since he was too ill to attend in person, fellow judge George Shaw accepted the award on his behalf saying, "Everyone who works in the curry sector owes Pat a huge debt and never has a Lifetime Achievement Award so been richly deserved."

On 22 November 2020 it was planned that Sanjay Anand of Madhu's Caterers and Restaurants would present this Lifetime Achievement Award to Pat Chapman in conjunction with Yawar Khan owner Akash Tandoori Restaurant, Wallington, Surrey and founder The Asian Catering Federation and Awards. The ceremony to present the award was cancelled as restrictions on gatherings were in force due to the Covid-19 pandemic. The award was delivered to Chapman's home.

== Works ==
Chapman's first cookery book, The Indian Restaurant Cookbook, was published in 1984 and is still in print. Chapman wrote some 36 books, with international sales exceeding 2 million copies. Most are on curry, but some of his other books cover cuisines such as Thai, Chinese, Middle Eastern and International spicy cuisines. His Balti Cookbook was the first on the subject and became a Sunday Times Number 1 bestseller.

=== Books ===
- 1984 Curry Club Indian Restaurant Cookbook, Piatkus, London
- 1985 Little Curry Book, Piatkus, London
  - 1986 El Librito del Amante del Curry, Spanish version, pub El Cuerno, Madrid
- 1988 Curry Club Favourite Restaurant Curries, Piatkus, London
  - 2004 Modern Indian Cooking, republished by John Blake
- 1989 Sainsbury's Curries, Octopus, London
- 1989 Curry Club Chinese Restaurant Cookbook, Piatkus, London
- 1989 Curry Club Middle Eastern Cookbook, Piatkus, London
- 1990 Curry Club Vegetarian Cookbook, Piatkus, London
- 1991 Curry Club 250 Favourite Curries, Piatkus, London
- 1993 Curry, Human & Rousseau, South Africa
  - 1993 Kerrie, in Afrikaans, Human & Rousseau, South Africa
- 1993 Curry Club Vindaloo and other Hot Curries, Piatkus, London
- 1993 Curry Club 250 Hot and Spicy Dishes, Piatkus, London
- 1993 Curry Club Tandoori and Tikka Dishes, Piatkus, London
- 1993 Curry Club Balti Curry Cookbook, Piatkus, London
  - 2006 Modern Balti Curries, republished by John Blake, London
- 1994 Sainsbury’s Balti Cookbook, Martin Books, Cambridge
- 1994 Curry Club Book of Indian Cuisine, US edition, Prima New York
- 1995 Curry Club 100 Favourite Tandoori Recipes, Piatkus, London
- 1995 Pat Chapman's Quick and Easy Curries, BBC Books
- 1995 Curry Club Quick After Work Curries, Piatkus, London
- 1995 Meatless Indian Cooking from the Curry Club, Prima Publications
- 1996 Quick After Work Curries, US edition, Fisher, Tucson, Arizona)
- 1996 Curry Club Bangladeshi Restaurant Curries, Piatkus, London
- 1996 Curries - Masterchef Series, Orion, London
- 1996 Pat Chapman's Thai Restaurant Cookbook, Hodder & Stoughton, London
- 1997 Pat Chapman's Taste of the Raj, Hodder & Stoughton, London
- 1997 Sainsbury's Quick and Easy Stir-fries, Martin Books, Cambridge
- 1997 Homestyle Middle Eastern Cooking, Crossing Press, Berkeley, California
- 1997 Masterchefs (Compendium volume), Orion, London
- 1997 North Indian Curries Classic Cooks, Orion
- 1997 Pat Chapman's Curry Bible, Hodder & Stoughton
- 1998 Homestyle Indian Cooking, US edition, Crossing Press, Berkeley, California
- 1998 Pat Chapman's Balti Bible, Hodder & Stoughton
- 1998 Pat Chapman's Noodle Book, Hodder & Stoughton, London
- 1998 Classic Cooks (compendium volume), Orion, London
- 2000 Pat Chapman's Vegetable Curry Bible, Hodder & Stoughton, London
- 2000 Petit Plats Curry, French edition, Hachette Marabout, Paris
- 2005 New Curry Bible, republished by John Blake
- 2007 India: Food & Cooking, New Holland, London

=== Good Curry Guides ===
Chapman built up a database on Indian restaurants with a team of some 60 reporters who visited restaurants all over Britain. In 1984, this led to the publication of the Good Curry Guide, a critique of the top 1,000 UK curry restaurants. It has been sponsored by Cobra Beer since 1992, and was cited by the Oxford English Dictionary for usage of the noun balti house

- 1984 Good Curry Guide, Curry Club
- 1987 Good Curry Guide, Piatkus, London
- 1991 Cobra Good Curry Guide, Piatkus, London
- 1995 Cobra Good Curry Guide, Piatkus, London
- 1998 Cobra Good Curry Guide, Hodder & Stoughton, London
- 1999 Cobra Good Curry Guide, Hodder & Stoughton, London
- 2000 Cobra Curryholics' Directory, John Blake Publishing, London
- 2001 Cobra Good Curry Guide, Simon & Schuster, London
- 2004 Cobra Good Curry Guide, Curry Club, Haslemere
- 2007 Cobra Good Curry Guide, John Blake Publishing, London
- 2009 Cobra Good Curry Guide, John Blake Publishing, London
- 2010 Cobra Good Curry Guide, John Blake Publishing, London New cover same text as 2009.
- 2013 Cobra Good Curry Guide, Curry Club Publisher, Haslemere — Complete rewrite.

=== DVDs ===
- Pat Chapman's Curry Magic (2006)
