= Salt Lick Award =

Canadian food manufacturing award

The Salt Lick Award was an award given to Canadian manufacturers of foods that demonstrated inappropriately high sodium levels in order to raise awareness of high-sodium foods to general consumers. The name refers to salt licks. The award has not been awarded since 2010.

== Purpose and History ==
The award was given by the Canadian Stroke Network, the Canadian Obesity Network and the Advanced Foods and Materials Network. Some of the baby and toddler foods examined by the two groups had no added sodium, while other foods had levels considered excessive. The Salt Lick Award is part of World Salt Awareness Week.

== Winners ==
- 2010 - Gerber Graduates Lil' Entrees (Chicken & Pasta Wheel Pickups)
- 2009 - Canadian pizza producers
- 2008 - A&W (Chubby Junior Kids' Meal)
