= Blue (soft drink) =

Angolan soft drink brand

Blue (Refrigerante)
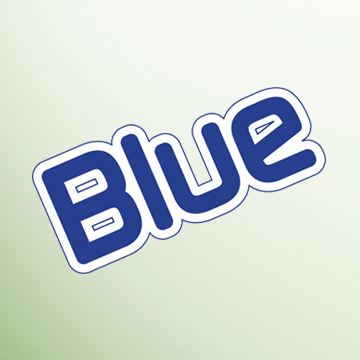
- Type: Soda
- Manufacturer: Refriango
- Distributor: Several
- Origin: Angola
- Introduced: 2005
- Flavor: Blue Pulp, Blue Passion Fruit, Blue Orange, Blue Coco Pineapple, BlueLemon-Lime, Blue Guarana, Blue Pineapple, Blue Apple, Blue Tamarind and Blue Tropical Strawberry.
- Website: www.refriango.com

Blue is the mark of a soda juice fruit and vitamins sold in Angola. The drink is available in 10 flavors. Released in 2005 by Refriango company, the market leader in Angola, it was awarded the Gold Medal at the International Monde Selection Quality. The Blue brand is available in distinct flavors which other Angolan carbonated soft drinks do not use.

The drink's slogan is "life is a feast".

== Variants of the mark ==
- Blue Pulp - with pieces of fruit, orange and pineapple are the fruit that remain in the mouth (Launched in 2012)
- Blue Lemon-Lime
- Blue Orange - with concentrated orange juice
- Blue Passion fruit - With passion fruit juice concentrate
- Blue Pineapple
- Blue Tamarind
- Blue Coco Pineapple
- Blue Tropical Strawberry
- Blue Apple
- Blue Guarana

== Awards ==
In 2013, Blue received a gold medal from the International Competition of Quality, Monde Selection. The highest award is only awarded to products which are distinguished by their quality, prestige and innovation worldwide.
