= Arya Mitra Sharma =

- Born: 1959 (age 66–67); Berlin, Germany
- Education: Free University of Berlin
- Known for: Obesity Management, Edmonton Obesity Staging System, Hypertension
- Medical career
- Profession: Professor of Medicine
- Institutions: University of Alberta, McMaster University, Humboldt University Berlin, Free University Berlin

Arya Mitra Sharma (born 1959) is a German-born Canadian physician who served as Professor of Medicine and Alberta Health Services Chair in Obesity Research and Management at the University of Alberta and medical director of the Alberta Health Services Obesity Program from 2007 to 2021. In 2006, he founded the Canadian Obesity Network (now Obesity Canada). He also served on numerous committees of professional organizations including The Obesity Society (TOS) and the International Association for the Study of Obesity (IASO). Since 2021, he is retired (professor emeritus) and freelances occasionally as a speaker and research, educational, and strategic consultant for commercial and non-commercial organisations.

== Life and career ==
Born in Berlin (West) Germany in 1959, he moved to India in 1965 where he lived till 1977 after graduating from the Frank Anthony Public School, New Delhi. On his return to Germany in 1977, he received his Abitur from the Weidig Gymnasium, Butzbach, Hesse before taking up his medical training at the Free University of Berlin from which he graduated in 1986. In 2002 he was awarded a Canada Research Chair (Tier 1) in Cardiovascular Obesity Research and Management and was appointed Professor of Medicine at McMaster University, Hamilton, Canada. In 2007 he was awarded the Alberta Health Services endowed chair in Obesity Research and Management and appointed Professor of Medicine at the University of Alberta, Edmonton, Canada, where he is also currently the medical director of the Edmonton Region Bariatric Program. In 2005 he founded the Canadian Obesity Network (now Obesity Canada). He is also a founding member and current president of the Canadian Association of Bariatric Physicians and Surgeons. He writes a daily obesity blog (Dr. Sharma's Obesity Notes) and has given media interviews on global, national and local TV, radio and print media.
