= Laconiko =

Brand of olive oils

- Type: Privately held company
- Industry: Food
- Founded: March 2008
- Founder: Diamantis Pierrakos & Dino Pierrakos
- Headquarters: Manassas, Virginia
- Area served: Worldwide
- Website: https://laconiko.com/

Laconiko is a brand of olive oils from Lakonia, Peloponnese, Greece. The brand offers a variety of extra virgin olive oils and flavored olive oils from the Koroneiki and Kalamon variety of olives, balsamic vinegars, fruit vinegars, and wine vinegars . They are included in the Official Index of the World’s Best Olive Oils.

== History ==
Vasilios Pierrakos, a third-generation olive oil farmer, continued his family's work of producing olive oil in the mid 1900s. In the spring of 2009, his two sons, Diamantis and Dinos Pierrakos, officially founded the company, Laconiko, which at the time was named “Our Family Olive Oil.”

== Products ==
The brand only produces extra virgin olive oil from their olive grove in Greece. The tasting notes include green olives, banana, and hints of almond. It has an acidity of less than 0.18%. In 2020, Laconiko was the world's #2 ranked olive oil producer, according to EVOOWR. In 2018, Laconiko's "Olio Nuovo" won Gold at the Athena International Olive Oil Competition in Delphi for "Best Koroneiki," and the same olive oil also won Gold at NYIOOC World Olive Oil Competition in New York City. Olio Nuovo also won "Best of Greece" at Anatolian International Olive Oil Competition in 2026. In 2025 Laconiko's "Estate" Olive Oil won "Best of Greece" and "Best Koroneiki" at the Athena International Olive Oil Competition in Chania, Crete, while its flavored olive oil, Laconiko Citrus Habanero won "Best Flavored Olive Oil Worldwide". As of 2026, Laconiko's flagship "Estate" olive oil is their most awarded olive oil, and the #1 ranked olive oil from Greece with twelve awards at the world's largest competition, the New York International Olive Oil Competition (NYIOOC). Their organic "Laconiko Kambos" olive oil has been recognized at NYIOOC as well. Laconiko's extra virgin olive oil has also been recognized in Canada at the Canada International Olive Oil Competition , Asia at Olive Japan 2021 and other international olive oil competitions.

In 2023, Laconiko launched its highest polyphenol and oleocanthal extra virgin olive oil, ZOI with 1,284 mg/kg of polyphenols, and 969 mg/kg of oleocanthal. In 2025, ZOI was named "Healthiest Olive Oil" by Laura Williams, MS, ACSM EP-C, Shoshana Pritzker, RD from Yahoo Health. In 2026, ZOI received highest honors from the Oleocanthal International Society in Malaga, Spain for its Oleocanthal composition.

In addition to the regular extra virgin olive oil, Laconiko also produces over 22 types of flavored olive oil.

Their fruit vinegar line, Pureevino, received a SOFI specialty food association new product award in 2023 for its Blueberry Pureevino.
