= Anti Additive Association =

Food standards organization

Anti Additive Association(A.A.)
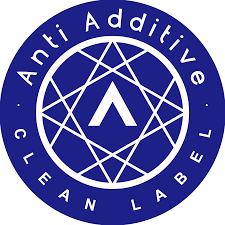
- Anti Additive Clean Label
- Founded: 2013
- Type: NPO
- Region served: Worldwide
- Website: www.anti-a.org

The Anti Additive Association (A.A) is a non-profit organization that sets standards, certifies, and labels in order to provide an additive-free food environment. The A.A. also supports and facilitates the work of anti additive and clean label, the concepts which both originated in the Netherlands, Europe.

== About ==
Founded in 2013, the A.A. set its headquarter in Europe and a branch in Asia.

According to the data from the European Union, people are now more concerned with the ingredients of food and the Clean Label marked on the products. Thus, the A.A. is dedicated to building a more sustainable food system by removing the food additives, such as flavor enhancer, food coloring, preservatives, and flour treatment agent. The organization also participated in the program of daily necessities(e.g. detergent).

== Certification ==
A.A. Certification, also named as Food and Beverage Production Certification, evaluates the producing process with Codex Alimentarius recognized standards to ensure the food safety. The certification program requires the inspection of process of production, and the organization also invites professionals from all fields to be on the advisory panel, consist of industry representatives, nutritionists, food science and technology experts, and other relevant scholars. Recently, the organization participated in the certification mechanism of DIN (Deutsches Institut für Normung).

Certification categories:

- Restaurant and Food
- Sugar
- Pet Food
- Daily Necessities
- Cosmetics
- Residue
- Halal Plus

== Awards ==
Since 2016, A.A. Taste Award is an award presented annually and the winners are honored at annual ceremonies. The jury panel includes professionals of food and beverage industry, Michelin chefs, nutritionists, academics, and food critics. Superior Taste Award, Monde Selection, Great Taste Awards, and A.A. Taste Award are widely known as the world's premier awards and taste selections.

== Award ceremony ==
- 2016's ceremony held at Sydney Opera House, Australia
- 2017's ceremony held at Westin Grande Sukhumvit Bangkok, Thailand
- 2018's ceremony held at W Hotel HongKong
- 2019's ceremony held at Makuhari Messe Chiba, Japan (Cancel)
- 2020 and 2021's ceremony is canceled due to pandemic
