= Charlie Papazian =

American nuclear engineer, brewer and author

Charles N. Papazian (born January 23 c. 1949) is an American nuclear engineer, brewer and author. He founded the Association of Brewers and the Great American Beer Festival, and wrote The Complete Joy of Home Brewing (1984). He is the longtime former president (1979–2016) of the Brewers Association. He is also the creator of the National Pie Day, a celebration of pies which is celebrated on January 23, Papazian's birthday.

== Early life and career ==
Papazian, an American of Armenian descent, was born in 1949 and raised in Warren Township, New Jersey. His father was a chemical engineer who managed a manufacturing plant. He attended the University of Virginia, graduating in 1972 with a Bachelor of Science degree in Nuclear Engineering.

In 1970, while in Charlottesville, Papazian was introduced to an older man who had learned to brew beer during Prohibition. Papazian, who was working part time as a janitor at a daycare facility, began brewing in the daycare's kitchen during off-hours. As people began to show interest in his beer, Papazian wrote up a two-page set of instructions and began distributing it by hand.

After college, he moved to Boulder, Colorado where he eventually landed a job as an elementary school teacher, a position he held for ten years. During that period, Papazian began offering weekly home brewing classes in his kitchen. One of his earliest students was Jeff Lebesch, co-founder of New Belgium Brewing Company.

While in Boulder he also started a homebrew club called Hops, Barley & The Alers. Monthly meetings focused on different beer styles and featured samples of members homebrew creations. There was also a yearly event titled Beer & Steer, where select members brewed a 5 gallon keg of beer which was shared among attendees during a multiday campout in the hills outside Boulder. The event included bbq, commemorative shirts and a homemade hot tub fashioned from bales of hay and a large tarp.

== Brewing associations ==
In 1978 U.S. President Jimmy Carter signed a law reopening the beer market to small craft brewers, also permitting homebrewing. In 1979 Papazian founded the Association of Brewers, and remained president of that organization until 2005, when the Association of Brewers merged with the 63-year-old Brewers Association of America, and Papazian was named president of the combined organization.

Papazian also founded the American Homebrewers Association in 1978, a group that is also now under the umbrella of the Brewers Association. Other organizations and annual events subsequently founded by Papazian include the Institute for Brewing Studies, Brewers Publications, the Great American Beer Festival, the World Beer Cup, and Zymurgy magazine.

The American Homebrewers Association is a division of the Brewers Association focused on homebrewers of beer, cider, and mead. The AHA was founded in 1978 by Papazian. The AHA runs the world's largest homebrew competition and also organizes several homebrew events in the United States and Canada. Gary Glass is the current director. The AHA publishes the magazine Zymurgy six times per year to its 47,000 members.

Every year the AHA hosts events like National Homebrew Competition, the Homebrew Con (previously known as the National Homebrewers Conference) which includes the finals of the National Homebrew Competition, held the third week in June, the Big Brew, held the first Saturday in May, Mead Day, held the first Saturday in August and Learn to Homebrew Day, held the first Saturday in November.

American Homebrewers Association gives the Ninkasi Award, a prize given for the brewer who gains the most points in the final round of the National Homebrew Competition, judged at the National Homebrewers Conference. Points are gained from the brewer's winning entries in the 23 categories of beer and several categories of mead and cider. At least 2 points (1 bronze placement) must come from a beer entry. The Ninkasi Award is named in honor of Ninkasi, the Sumerian goddess of beer.

== Complete Joy of Home Brewing ==
In 1984 Papazian published his first book on the subject of homebrewing, titled The Complete Joy of Home Brewing. The book contained a foreword by influential British beer writer Michael Jackson. As of August 2005, The Complete Joy of Home Brewing had seen 25 reprintings, 3 editions, and has sold over 900,000 copies. A fourth edition was released in September 2014. As the first American (and, for over a decade, the only) mass-market book to provide in-depth information on subject of how to brew beer in the home, The Complete Joy of Home Brewing was very often the sole source of home brewing information for novice home brewers in America. Consequently, the book has gained iconic status among America's home brewing community, who have referred to it as the "home brewer's bible." Throughout The Complete Joy of Home Brewing, Papazian reminds the novice brewer to "Relax. Don't worry. And have a homebrew." Papazian has since written five more books.

== National Pie Day ==
Papazian also began National Pie Day, a celebration of pies. It is celebrated on January 23, Papazian's birthday. after he declared his own birthday, January 23, to be National Pie Day. Since 1986, National Pie Day is sponsored by the American Pie Council. In 2014, the American Pie Council partnered with Paramount Pictures in promoting the romantic thriller film Labor Day in conjunction with National Pie Day. (A pie-making scene features prominently in the film, and the film's general release was within a few days of National Pie Day.)

== Books ==
- Joy of Brewing, Copyright 1976, Log Boom Brewing, Boulder Colorado
- The Complete Joy of Homebrewing (4th Edition), ISBN 0-06-221575-2
- The Homebrewer's Companion, ISBN 0-06-058473-4
- Brewing Mead: Wassail! In Mazers of Mead (co-authored with Robert Gayre), ISBN 0-937381-00-4
- Home Brewer's Gold: Prize-Winning Recipes from the 1996 World Beer Cup Competition (compiled by Charlie Papazian, currently out-of-print), ISBN 0-380-79192-7
- Zymurgy For The Homebrewer And Beer Lover: Best Articles and Advice From America's #1 Homebrewing Magazine (edited by Charlie Papazian, currently out-of-print), ISBN 0-380-79399-7
- Microbrewed Adventures: A Lupulin Filled Journey to the Heart and Flavor of the World's Greatest Craft Beers, ISBN 0-06-075814-7

== Personal life ==
Papazian lives in the Boulder, Colorado area with his wife Sandra. The couple have a daughter, Carla.

== See also ==
- Homebrewing
