= Good Curry Guide =

The Good Curry Guide was a regularly published guidebook providing information about the UK's top curry restaurants. The Good Curry Guide was first published in 1984, by Pat Chapman, founder of The Curry Club. From 1991 through to the last edition in 2013, Cobra Beer was the Guide's sole sponsor.

== Overview ==
The Good Curry Guide reported on over 1,000 top curry establishments. Though there was advertising and sponsorship, no fees were accepted for inclusion, and all of the inspections were anonymous.

Readers were actively encouraged to submit their reviews, online or by post, which were then considered for prospective inclusion in the next guide.

The Guide was revived as an online publication in 2024 by Pat Chapman's friend and colleague George Shaw - a fellow judge for the Asian Catering Federation's 'Asian Curry Awards' and 'Asian & Oriental Chef Awards'.

== Restaurant Awards ==
The Good Curry Awards were given to the top UK curry restaurants by The Good Curry Guide from 1991.

== Edition History ==
- 1984 Good Curry Guide, Curry Club — ISBN 0-9509170-0-1
- 1987 Good Curry Guide, Piatkus, London — ISBN 0-86188-523-6
- 1991 Cobra Good Curry Guide, Piatkus, London — ISBN 0-86188-989-4
- 1995 Cobra Good Curry Guide, Piatkus, London — ISBN 0-7499-1407-6
- 1998 Cobra Good Curry Guide, Hodder & Stoughton, London — ISBN 0-340-68032-6
- 1999 Cobra Good Curry Guide, Hodder & Stoughton, London — ISBN 0-340-68033-4
- 2000 Cobra Curryholics’ Directory, John Blake Publishing, London — ISBN 0-9537735-0-7
- 2001 Cobra Good Curry Guide, Simon & Schuster, London — ISBN 0-7432-0840-4
- 2004 Cobra Good Curry Guide, Curry Club, Haslemere — ISBN 978-0-9537735-1-0
- 2007 Cobra Good Curry Guide, John Blake Publishing, London — ISBN 978-1-84454-311-3
- 2009 Cobra Good Curry Guide, John Blake Publishing, London — ISBN 1-84454-311-0
- 2010 Cobra Good Curry Guide, John Blake Publishing, London — ISBN 1-84454-311-0 New cover same text as 2009.
- 2013 Cobra Good Curry Guide, Curry Club Publisher, Haslemere — ISBN 978-0-9537735-3-4 Complete rewrite.

== See also ==
- The Curry Club
- Curry Awards
- Curry Club Magazine
