= Curry Awards =

British culinary award

The Curry Awards is an award given to curry restaurants in the United Kingdom, which have achieved "total excellence" in all departments by The Curry Club in association with its publication, The Good Curry Guide.

The Good Curry Guide Awards ceremony was established in May 1991 by Pat Chapman and was the first awards ceremony of any restaurant sector. The awards and the associated guide books continued until 2013.

== History ==
Pat Chapman's first Good Curry Guide was published in 1984. About 600 Indian restaurants were selected for entry (out of the 4,000 that existed then) and it carried little critical information. The next edition (1987) addressed this by having critical entries from correspondents. No one restaurant was rated higher than any other. In other words neither of these editions named the ‘Best in Class’; Chapman considered that since only the top percentage achieved entry, all entries were ‘Good Curry Guide Restaurants’. The publication attracted considerable media attention. However journalists and food writers from such publications as The Evening Standard, The Daily Telegraph, The Times, and the BBC Good Food Magazine pressured Chapman to name the best.

Chapman asked his correspondents which restaurants could qualify into a TOP 30 category (which became TOP 100 in 1995), and which could be best regionally and best in UK. The results were duly published in the 1991 Guide and to launch it Chapman decided to hold an Awards Ceremony for the winners. Unlike today, it was a time when there were few such ceremonies. Chapman modelled it on the Academy Award, by commencing with a formal presentation of a certificate to each winner in turn before a group of their peers and media, and following with a luncheon to emphasise the event's social side. On that first ceremony, there were eight winners, including Chutney Mary Indian restaurant London, SW10 as Best in UK, where the event was held. Media and public response to this was enormous. So by the time the next GCG was due for publication, the TOP 30 was increased to the new TOP 100 category, and from that no less than 18 ‘Best in Category were to be awarded.

A bigger venue was needed, away from the winning restaurants. Chapman had been to an Asian wedding at a Heathrow Hotel where the catering was by Madhu's. Chapman suggested they did his catering and the Park Lane Hotel was chosen with a seating capacity of 330 seats. It was the first time Madhu's had catered for any event other than Asian weddings. Chapman organised the entire event. Of the 300 seats, 80 were taken by media.

== Present ==
Between 18 and 20 Awards are given before an audience of restaurant personnel and their guests, sponsors, media, press and others, totalling some 800. The luncheon is a major feature of the event. Catering for any event attended by others in the catering trade is a challenge; Chapman's Awards the more so. Being an Indian Restaurant event, the restaurateurs are from all countries of the subcontinent so it is no mean task for the caterer to satisfy 800 of his international peers, and one few caterers would attempt.

The event is widely reported in the UK and in the subcontinent, and it is televised by Sony Entertainment Television Asia and is screened and repeated in Australia, Canada, Europe, Pakistan, India, Mauritius, the Middle East, New Zealand, South Africa, the United Kingdom and the United States to millions of viewers.

== Timescale ==
The Good Curry Guide Awards ceremony has been held each time a Good Curry Guide is published as follows:

Year	Venue	Caterer	Notes	
1991	Chutney Mary	Chutney Mary	—	
1995	Park Lane Hotel, Piccadilly	Madhu's Southall	televised by BBC Network East	
1998	Nehru Centre, W1	Clay Oven, Wembley	—	
1999	Café Royal, Regent St, W1	Madhu's Southall	—	
2001	Hilton Park Lane, W1	Madhu's Southall	—	
2004	Hilton Park Lane, W1	Madhu's Southall	televised by Sony TV Asia	—
2007	Hilton Park Lane, W1	Madhu's Southall	televised by Sony TV Asia	—
2010	Ithihaas	Ithihaas	Birmingham B1	—
2013	Painted Heron		London, SW10	

== Past and present winners of "Best in the UK" award ==
The chief Award is the Best in the UK.

- 1991/4 ~ Chutney Mary, SW10
- 1995/7 ~ Bombay Brasserie, SW7
- 1998/9 ~ La Porte des Indes, W1
- 1999/2001 ~ Chutney Mary, SW10
- 2002/3 ~ Quilon Restaurant, SW1
- 2004/6 ~ Madhu's, Southall
- 2007/8 ~ Ithiaas, Birmingham
- 2009/10 ~ Masala World Group, London: Amaya, Chutney Mary, Veerswamys, Masala Zone (8)
- 2013 ~ Painted Heron, SW1

== Good Curry Guide Awards Categories, 2013 ==
Regional Awards

These 25 restaurants (and one group of 11) are located all over the UK, and are considered to be the Best in their region. Each of these winners, has been visited by Pat Chapman during 2012/3 and presented with their Award Certificate.

* Best in the North of England 2013

- Best UK GROUP ~ Akbars (11 restaurants): Bradford (2), Birmingham, Glasgow, Leeds (2), Manchester, Middlesbrough, Newcastle, Rotherham & York.
- Best in YORKSHIRE ~ Ashoka Sheffield
- Best in MERSEYSIDE ~ Gulshan Liverpool
- Best in NORTH EAST ~ Valley 397 Newcastle

* Best in the Midlands, England 2013

- Best in MIDLANDS ~ Anoki Burton, Derby, Nottingham
- Best in EAST MIDLANDS ~ Curry Fever Leicester Leics
- Best in WEST MIDLANDS ~ Maharaja Birmingham West Midlands
- Best in CENTRAL ENGLAND ~ Calcutta Brasserie Milton Keynes Bucks

* Best in South East England 2013 (alphabetical)

- Best in the SOUTH EAST ~ The Ambrette Margate Kent & Rye Sussex
- Best ON SOUTH COAST ~ Bombay Bay, Southsea Hants
- Best in OUTER LONDON, WEST ~ Brilliant Southall, Middlesex
- Best in HOME COUNTIES, NORTH ~ Chez Mumtaj St Albans, Herts
- Best in SURREY ~ India Dining, Warlingham, Surrey
- Best in SOUTH ENGLAND ~ Massala, Cobham, Surrey
- Best in HOME COUNTIES, WEST ~ Mango Lounge Windsor Berks
- Best in OUTER LONDON, SOUTH ~ Sesame New Malden

* Best in South West England 2013

- Best in THE WEST COUNTRY ~ Viceroy, Yeovil, Somerset
- Best in THE SOUTH WEST ~ Mysterica, Bristol
- Best in CORNWALL ~ Rajdoot, St Ives, Cornwall

* Best in Scotland 2013

- Best overall in SCOTLAND ~ Verandah Edinburgh
- Best in NORTH SCOTLAND ~ Balaka St Andrews Fife
- Best in EAST SCOTLAND ~ Mya, Edinburgh, Lothian

* Best in Wales 2013'

- Best in WALES ~ Moksh Cardiff Glamorgan
- Best in NORTH WALES ~ Bengal Dynasty Shotton & Llandudno

Cuisine Awards (Not Awarded in 2012/3)

- Best Bangladeshi
- Best Nepalese
- Best Indian
- Best Pakistani
- Best Sri Lankan
- Best South East Asian

Speciality Awards (Not Awarded in 2012/3)

- Best Chef
- Best Maître d'
- Best Newcomer

Lifetime Achievement Award (Not Awarded in 2012/3)

Awarded 2007 to Satish Arora, Chef Culinaire, Taj Group

== See also ==
- Pat Chapman
- The Curry Club
- Good Curry Guide

== Bibliography ==
• 1984 Good Curry Guide, Curry Club — ISBN 0-9509170-0-1

• 1987 Good Curry Guide, Piatkus, London — ISBN 0-86188-523-6

• 1991 Cobra Good Curry Guide, Piatkus, London — ISBN 0-86188-989-4

• 1995 Cobra Good Curry Guide, Piatkus, London — ISBN 0-7499-1407-6

• 1998 Cobra Good Curry Guide, Hodder & Stoughton, London — ISBN 0-340-68032-6

• 1999 Cobra Good Curry Guide, Hodder & Stoughton, London — ISBN 0-340-68033-4

• 2000 Cobra Curryholics’ Directory, John Blake Publishing, London — ISBN 0-9537735-0-7

• 2001 Cobra Good Curry Guide, Simon & Schuster, London — ISBN 0-7432-0840-4

• 2004 Cobra Good Curry Guide, Curry Club, Haslemere — ISBN 978-0-9537735-1-0

• 2007 Cobra Good Curry Guide, John Blake Publishing, London — ISBN 978-1-84454-311-3

• 2009 Cobra Good Curry Guide, John Blake Publishing, London — ISBN 1-84454-311-0

• 2010 Cobra Good Curry Guide, John Blake Publishing, London — ISBN 1-84454-311-0 New cover same text as 2009.

• 2013 Cobra Good Curry Guide, Curry Club Publisher, Haslemere — ISBN 978-0-9537735-3-4 Complete rewrite.

== DVD ==
• Good Curry Guide Award Ceremony 2007 https://web.archive.org/web/20090105192355/http://www.patchapman.co.uk/catalogue/product/914/2461
