= Cobra Foundation =

UK charity

- Company type: Registered Charity
- Founded: UK, 2005
- Headquarters: London, UK
- Area served: South Asia
- Website: www.cobrabeer.com/en/foundation

The Cobra Foundation is a registered UK charity. Its Head Office is located in Gt Queen's Street, WC2, Covent Garden, WC2. The Foundation is the charity arm of Cobra Beer itself a division of Molson Coors the world's seventh largest brewer by volume.

== Objectives ==
The Cobra Foundation is a small but significant independent charity providing health education and community support to South Asian communities hit by natural disasters. Specifically and currently, the Foundation specialises in funding clean water for village communities. For example, it made a grant of £10,000 to international NGO WaterAid which funded the needy in Pakistan, where even a relatively small amount of funding goes a long way. The money was raised through the sale of Cobra Beer during the 2010 National Curry Week.

== History ==
The Cobra Foundation was founded in 2005 by Lord Karan Bilimoria as the charitable arm of Cobra Beer and has continued its work since the formation of the joint venture between Molson Coors and the Cobra Partnership. To date, Cobra Beer has donated some £100,000 worth of beer to various charity events.
