= The Great Aussie Pie Competition =

Australian pie-making contest

- Industry: Meat pies and Pie shops
- Founded: 1989; 37 years ago in Sydney, Australia
- Founder: John Ross and Craig Perry
- Headquarters: Blaxland, New South Wales, Australia
- Parent: Aussie Pie Council
- Website: greataussiepiecomp.com.au

The Great Aussie Pie Competition is an Australian food competition held annually by the Aussie Pie Council, the Great Aussie Pie Contest began in 1989 to find commercially produced meat pie produced in Australia, to promote higher quality pie production, and to attempt to increase media attention upon the foodstuff, with the meat pie often dwarfed by the omnipresent advertising of fast food chains.

The contest attracts various pie-makers from all over Australia; the pies for the contest are judged anonymously to avoid bias towards or against specific bakeries or states. Run in parallel to the main contest is one for gourmet pies, with categories for such fillings as chicken, seafood and even vegetarian pies. As well as the main prize, certificates of excellence are awarded for entries that reach set quality standards. The main award is coveted due to the increased sales it generates, with many people travelling interstate to sample the winning pie.

== See also ==
- Australian cuisine
- List of food and drink awards
