= Bidni =

Olive cultivar from Malta

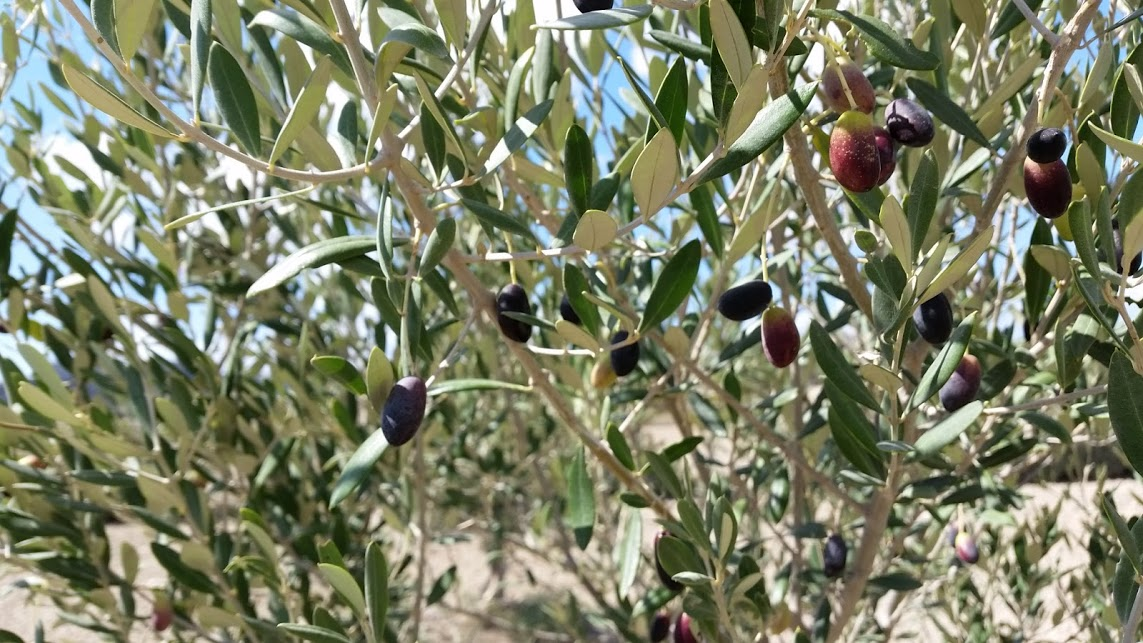
- Clusters of Bidni olives ripening on the tree

Olive (Olea europaea)
- Color of the ripe fruit: Black
- Origin: Malta
- Use: Oil and table
- Oil content: Low

The Bidni, which is also referred to as Bitni, is an olive cultivar from the Mediterranean island of Malta. The fruit is small in size, hearty with a "violet colour", and is renowned for its superior oil which is low in acidity. The latter is generally attributed to the poor quality alkaline soil found on the Maltese Islands. As an indigenous olive cultivar, the Bidni has developed a unique DNA profile, and is believed to be among the most ancient species on the island, triggering local authorities to declare some of these ancient trees as "national monuments", and as having an "Antiquarian Importance", a status which is enjoyed by only a handful of other species.

== Etymology ==
According to the "Maltese-English Dictionary", the word "Bidni" is derived from "badan", which means "corpulent", "robust", "to grow stout". Bidni ("żebbuġ", olive), is a "large olive tree producing very small olives". Therefore, the tree is called Bidni because it is "corpulent". This contradicts several online sources that suggest that the word Bidni originated from the rural hamlet of Bidnija, or that the word means "hunchback" in the Maltese language.

== Characteristics ==
In a landmark publication entitled, "Cultivation and Diseases of Fruit Trees in the Maltese Islands", John Borg (1922), Professor of Natural History, Superintendent of Agriculture, and founder of the Government's Experimental Farm at Għammieri, described the Bitni as follows:

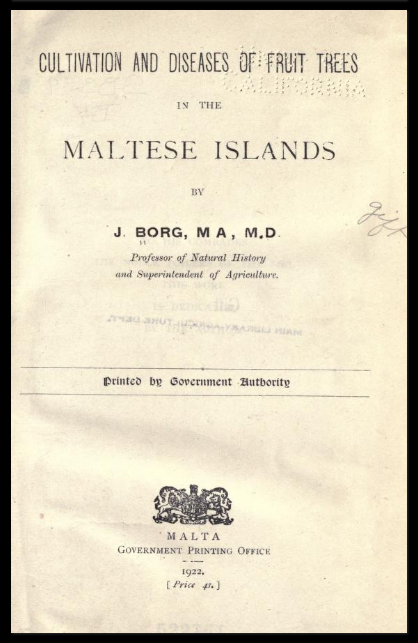
Borg's work, published in 1922

The tree is a vigorous grower and of strong constitution. The leaves are broad and rather short, of a lively shining green colour on the upper surface. The fruit is very small, nearly elliptical, with a comparatively very small stone, and turns to a beautiful shining dark violet at maturity, which takes place towards the close of October or early in November. It is very rich in oil of excellent quality, but the fruit though very small is often pickled or salted and has a rich flavour free from bitterness. The fruit is produced in clusters, and the production is sometimes astonishing, the tree becoming literally black with fruit. The tree and its fruit are very resistant to disease, the fruit presents also the advantage that it is never attacked by the olive-fly Dacus Oleae and is therefore always allowed to ripen on the tree. This is a variety which seems to be best suited for large plantations, with a view to the production of oil.

— John Borg

Decades later, the Bitni's disease resistant qualities still baffle scientists. Described by the Olive Oil Times as a "peculiar local variety", the Bidni's high levels of polyphenols, particularly oleuropein, which is a natural antibiotic produced by the tree to protect its fruit and leaves, may be behind this remarkable characteristic. The Bitni's oil has been described as "spicy" and "peppery", a characteristic which differentiates it from other oils. Once fully established, fruit is produced in abundance, up to 60 kilos per tree.

== Protection ==
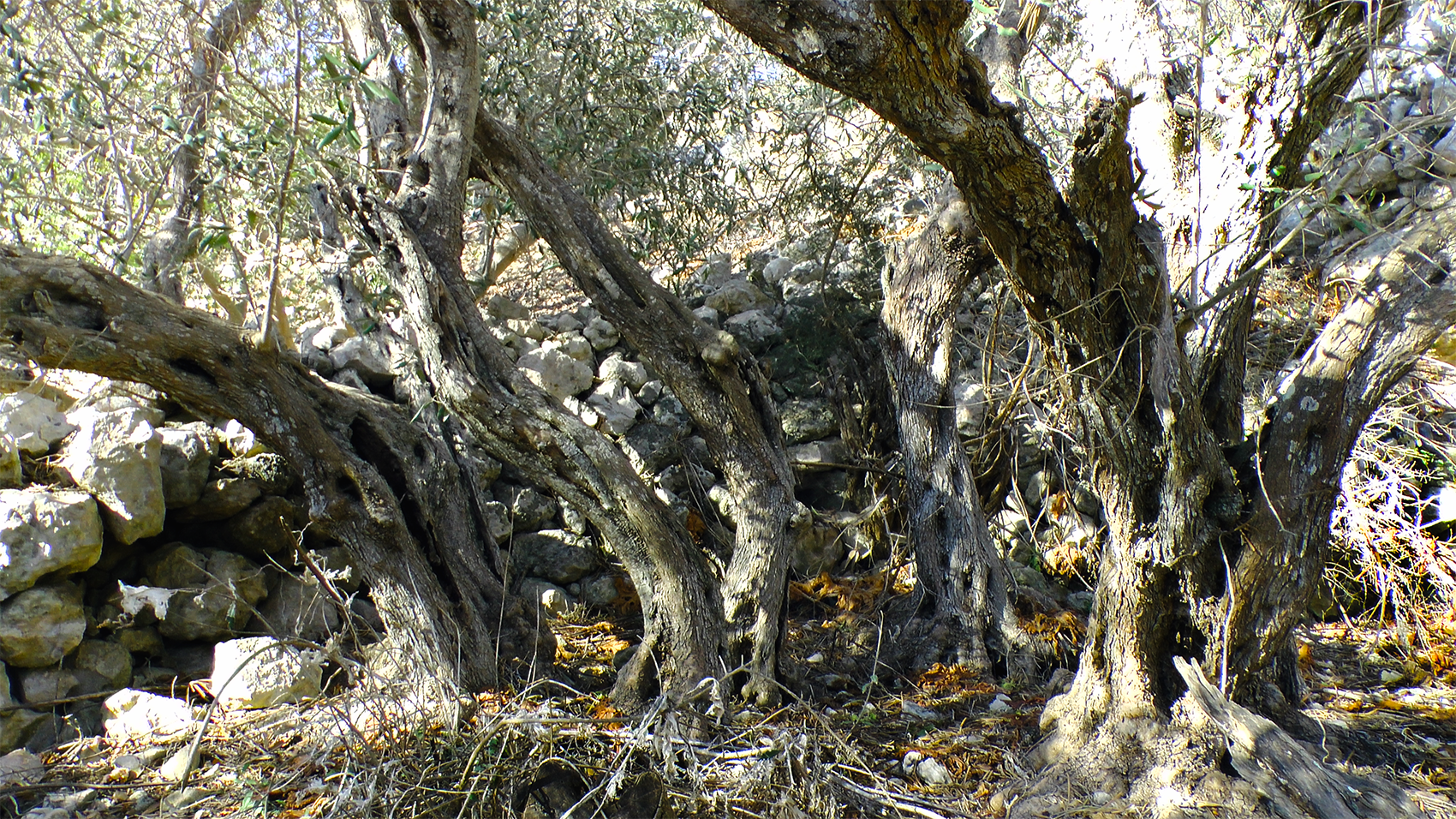
An ancient Bidni olive tree

The antiquity of Malta's ancient Bidni olive trees has been confirmed through carbon dating. Although the exact dates have been contested, with some noting that the trees were established during the mid-late Medieval period, others have argued that some of these olive trees date back to the 1st century A.D. The Bidni olive trees which are located just below an area known as Ġebel Għawżara have been protected since 1933, and are also listed in UNESCO's Database of National Cultural Heritage Laws. In 2011, after recognising their historical and landscape value, and in recognition of the fact that "only 20 trees remain from 40 at the beginning of the 20th century", local authorities declared this site as a Tree Protected Area, under the provisions of a regulation made in 2018. In 2021, two local entities were entrusted with the maintenance and protection of one of the olive groves located in Bidnija. These highly protected Bidni olive trees, with some measuring between five and eight metres in height, still bear fruit, and are often revered by visitors.

Since the Government of Malta has recognised the olive tree as forming an integral part of the traditional landscape, heavy pruning, felling, and uprooting of olive trees, including that of the Bidni variety, is subject to a permit from the relevant authorities.

Although the Bidni olive has no PDO status, there are a number of initiatives, which include studies on its genetic composition, to attain this certification. Apart from legally protecting its name, this status of authenticity is typically used by marketing professionals to gain a competitive advantage at both European and international markets.

== Revival ==
In January 2006, the Project for the Revival of the Indigenous Maltese Olive (PRIMO), was launched. Apart from reviving indigenous cultivars, such as the Bidni, one of the aims of this project was to substantially increase production levels in a bid to obtain the much coveted PDO status. As a direct result of PRIMO, some 30,000 Bidni olive trees were grafted and planted, thereby setting the necessary groundwork for the creation of a niche industry. The methodology behind this process consisted of several steps. After olive pips were collected from the ancient Bidni olive grove of Bidnija, these were then sowed at the Government of Malta's Experimental Farm in Għammieri and left to germinate for use as rootstock. Once the rootstocks were viable, cuttings were then taken from the millennia-old Bidni olive trees and carefully grafted to the rootstocks. Efforts to plant more Bidni olive trees are ongoing.

== Gastronomy ==
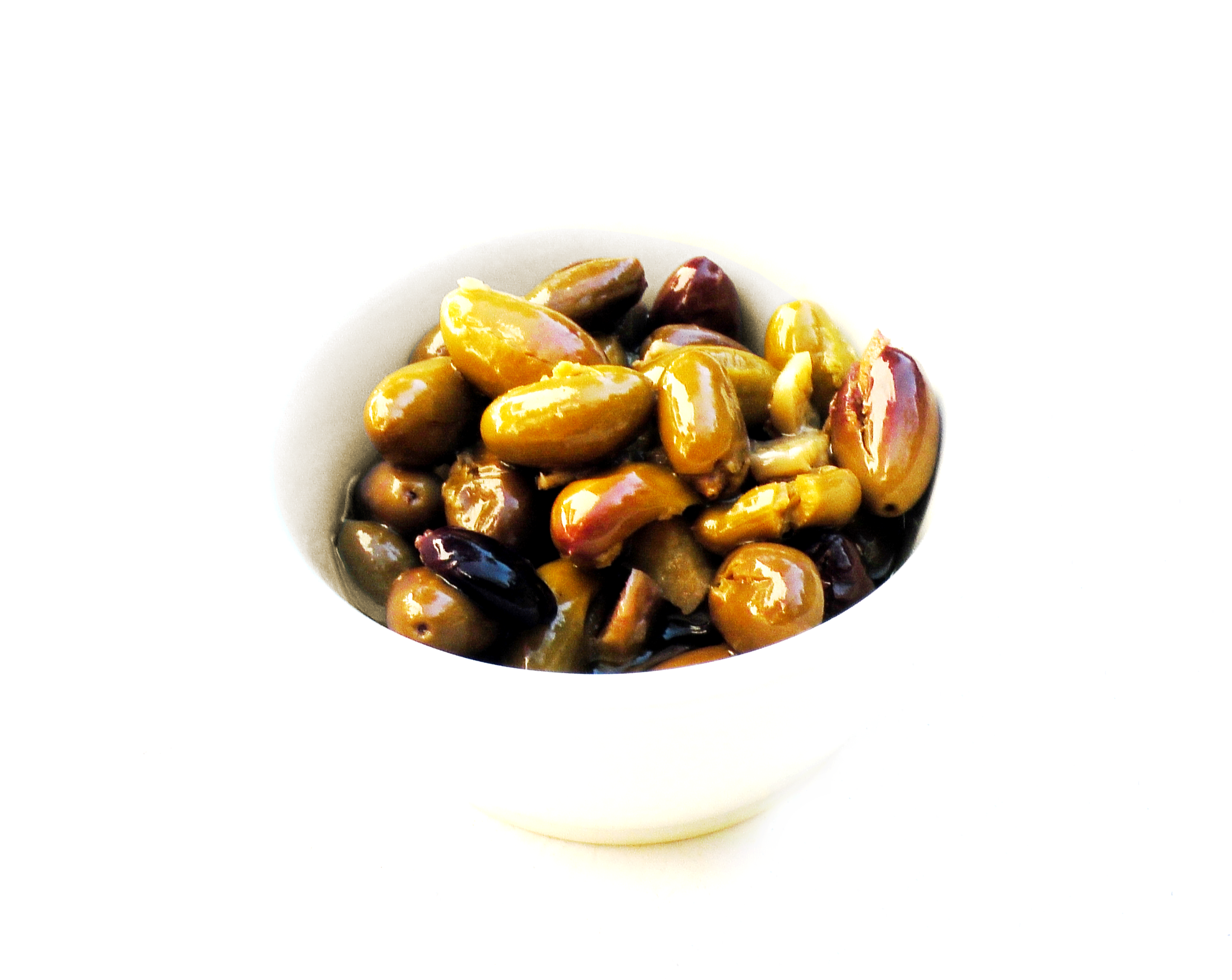
Crushed Bidni olives in garlic-infused extra virgin olive oil

The Maltese use their olive oil quite generously. In 2012, they ranked 8th in the world in per capita olive oil consumption. With olive oil processing equipment dating back to the Roman Empire, and possibly even before this period, the consumption of oil has since become an integral part of the Maltese diet. For instance, in 1804, French writer Louis de Boisgelin noted that, "a clove of garlic, or an onion, anchovies dipped in oil, and salted fish", was the "usual diet" of the Maltese.

Although the Bidni is mostly known for its superior oil, the small fruit can also be enjoyed as a table olive. One popular method is to crush Bidni olives in garlic-infused extra virgin olive oil, and then eat them with Maltese bread. Another method is to gently fry Bidni olives after preserving them in brine, and then serve them with seasonal herbs such as parsley or mint. The leaves of the Bidni tree have also been used to make tea which is believed to lower high blood pressure. This ancient remedy is "still used in rural communities in Malta".
