= Tiffin Cup =

British annual South Asian restaurant competition

The Tiffin Cup is an annual British competition run by the Tiffin Club to find the best South Asian restaurant in the United Kingdom. Nominees are selected by their constituency and then put forward by their local MPs. One restaurant from every region is then shortlisted and invited to participate in the Grand Final cook-off event held in the House of Commons of the United Kingdom, as judged by MPs and guest celebrities, with the proceeds going to a selected charity.

== History of Tiffin Cup ==
MP's are asked to put forward a restaurant to challenge for the Tiffin Cup. The restaurants are then visited and shortlisted, with the finalists going forwards to a live cook-off in the Houses of Parliament. In 2019 81 restaurants were nominated for the Tiffin Cup and 13 shortlisted restaurants were asked to cook for a panel of judges at the Palace of Westminster.

The competition was created by a group of MPs to celebrate quality South Asian food in Britain and to raise money for charity. All of the money raised goes to the World Vision charity. The Chairman of the Tiffin Cup is Keith Vaz MP and Chief Judge is Ainsley Harriott. The trophy is usually presented by the speaker of the house of commons.

== Past winners ==
2019 - Kuti's Brasserie, Southampton, Hampshire

2006 - Taj Mahal Indian Restaurant, Preseli Pembrokeshire

2007 - Bekash, Romford

2008 - Mint and Mustard, Cardiff North

2009 - Tamasha, Bromley and Chislehurst

=== Ongoing Competition ===
2019 - Kuti's Brasserie restaurant from Southampton, Hampshire won the Tiffin Cup at Parliament, London. Chief of judging was celebrity chef Ainsley Harriott and the first prize trophy was awarded by Speaker of the House of Commons, John Bercow. 13 restaurants from around the country took part. The winning dish was Sikandari Royal Lamb which the judges commented was fresh, seasonal and extremely tasty.

The other shortlisted restaurants were Black Pepper's (Wales) nominated by Ian Lucas MP, Red Chillies (east Anglia) nominated by Sir David Amess MP, Vivasa (South East) nominated by Prime Minister Theresa May MP, Al-Nawab (Yorkshire) nominated by Paula Sheriff MP, Indi's (South East) nominated by Conor Burns MP, Rajnagar (West Midlands) nominated by Julian Knight MP, Himalayan Kitchn (London) nominated by Ellie Reeves MP, Indique (North West) nominated by Jeff Smith MP, Prithi (London SW) nominated by Sir Edward Davey MP, Soi Kitchens (East Midlands) nominated by Pauline Latham MP, Dabbbawai (north west) nominated by Chi Onwurah, Nakodar Grill (Scotland) nominated by Paul Sweeney MP.

2015/15 - Mushtaqs Restaurant from Hamilton, Scotland won the Tiffin Cup. Ainsley Harriot, famous TV chef, said of the victorious Mushtaqs "Mushtaqs food has some of the best flavour combinations I have ever eaten."

2013 - The competition included Ainsley Harriet as the chair of a panel of judges.

Notable mention to the Bilash Balti in Lytham St Annes, Lancashire, which was the first restaurant in the Fylde to win the Best in the North West category.

2010 - A record 74 nominations were received by the Tiffin Club! The Launch of the Newby Teas Tiffin Cup 2010 was on Tuesday 14 September 2010.

In 2010, the competition was in aid of World Vision.

== Grand Finalists ==
=== 2006 ===
B. Raj Tandoori, Banff and Buchan

The Mirch Masala, Tooting

Royal Al Faisal, Birmingham

Taj Mahal, Pembrokeshire

Pan Ahar, Blyth Valley

Aagrah Shipley, Shipley

Bombay Dreams, Brent South

Queen Spice, South Queensferry

Sukhi's Indian Cuisine, Darwen

The Royal Bengal, Lowestoft

Bombay Spice, North London

The Tandoori Parlour, Castle Point

Bengal Spice, Hemel Hempstead

=== 2007 ===
Queens Spice, Edinburgh West

Maharaja, Castle Point

Passage to India, Stroud

Tower Tandoori, North Southwark and Bermondsey

Taste of India, Surrey Heath

Bekash, Romford

Shimla Spice, Shipley

4,500 miles from Delhi, Nottingham South

Moonlight Tandoori, Banff and Buchan

The Gulshan, Wolverhampton South East

Shahi Quila, Blackburn

=== 2008 ===
The Chilli Raj, St Albans

Chilli Chutney, Streatham

The Third Place, Shrewsbury

Mint and Mustard, Cardiff

The Royal Spice, Peterborough

Bombay Blues, London

Spice Lodge, Cheltenham

The Spice Bazaar, South West England

Azad Manzil Restaurant, North West England

Pan Ahar Restaurant, Havering

=== 2009 ===
Kareem's, Vale of Clwyd

Tamasha, Bromley and Chislehurst

Jalsagor, Herefordshire

Saffron, Leeds North East

Haweli Indian, Maidenhead

Lawthorn Farm Indian, Central Ayrshire

Shajan, Ribble Valley

Planet Poppadom, Great Yarmouth

Godalming Tandoori, South West Surrey

The Spice Bazaar, Totnes

== Sources ==
- https://www.dailyecho.co.uk/news/17748293.39-s-official-kuti-39-s-crowned-uk-39-s-best-curry-house/
- http://news.bbc.co.uk/2/hi/uk_news/wales/4988828.stm
- http://www.dictatenow.com/DictateNow_TiffinCup2007.html
- http://iwc2.labouronline.org/166359/6d3075ad-f24e-e3f4-3599-2e6f177b686d
- http://www.keithvaz.labour.co.uk/3ab18d0c-0a46-9094-d92b-0512f6c28bbc
- http://www.politics.co.uk/mps/press-releases/party-politics/conservatives/the-tiffin-cup-2009-$1281864.htm
- http://www.blackpoolgazette.co.uk/what-s-on/going-out/currying-flavour-with-mps-1-5808638

== See also ==
- Anglo-Indian Cuisine
