= British Sandwich & Food to Go Association =

The British Sandwich & Food to Go Association (BSA) was founded in January 1990 and is based in Chepstow, Wales. The aim of the organization is to improve the sandwich industry by setting standards and rewarding excellent sandwich manufacturers and retailers in the annual Sammies. The BSA is run non-commercially on behalf of its members by J&M Group, Ltd. This same group also runs various other organisations similar to the BSA such as the Pizza Pasta & Italian Food Society.

Originally the British Sandwich Association, the group changed its name in 2015 to formally recognise the wider "food to go" market.

== Aims ==
As the voice of the British sandwich industry, the primary aims of The British Sandwich Association are:

- To safeguard the integrity of the sandwich industry by setting technical standards for sandwich making and by encouraging improvement in the industry.
- To promote excellence and innovation in sandwich making.
- To provide a source of information for the industry.
- To promote the consumption of sandwiches.
- To provide a collective voice for all those involved in making, distributing and retailing sandwiches and to represent the views of the industry.

== Structure ==
The association is a non-commercial organisation run on behalf of its members by Food Events & Things (FEAT) Ltd. which is commercially responsible for all the activities undertaken by the British Sandwich Association. Food Events & Things (FEAT) also runs other similar organisations, including the Pizza Pasta & Italian Food Association, The International Sandwich Association and The Café Society.

== Management ==
The policy body responsible for guiding the association is the Management Committee, which comprises a balanced group of full members of the association who are elected each year. In addition to the chair and vice-chair, who can come from any sector of the organisation, the committee includes up to two manufacturers, two retailers, one sandwich bar chain, two independent sandwich bar operators, two retail bakers, two caterers, two suppliers and a representative from the van sales/distribution sector.

== Membership ==
Full membership of the association is open to any organisation involved in the sandwich industry – including retailers, suppliers, sandwich bars, manufacturers etc. – provided that they can prove that they at least match the minimum standards required by the association in its Codes of Practice. In the case of manufacturers and high risk suppliers, the association requires that its own auditor inspects the production facilities and systems of the organisation.

In the case of lower risk suppliers, evidence of appropriate standards from a recognised independent source may, in some cases, suffice.

Retail members of the association must have a rating under the Food Standards Agency Food Hygiene Rating Scheme of at least three.

Only full members of the association are permitted to call themselves ‘Members’ or to use the BSA symbol. Those who simply want to have access to the information resources of the association, without the benefits of full membership, can become Subscribers to International Sandwich & Snack News Information Services. However, they must not call themselves members, use the BSA symbol or in any way infer or pass themselves off as Members.

== Publications ==
A number of sandwich industry publications are produced in association with the British Sandwich Association. These include:

International Sandwich & Snack News magazine, launched in November 1990, is published six times a year. While the magazine supports the association and its members, particularly through the exclusive member index to suppliers at the back of the publication, it is independently published and does not necessarily always reflect the views of the association. International Sandwich & Snack News provides sandwich makers, retailers and others with up-to-date information and advice on everything from legislation and good practice to recipes. Copies of the magazine are free to members. Ebulletins are issued regularly to provide up-to-date information about the activities of the association and issues affecting members. The bulletins are circulated exclusively to full members of the association with the aim of giving them advance warning of events as well as information about new legislation etc. International Sandwich & Snack News Directory is published annually and provides a comprehensive list of suppliers and manufacturers to the industry. A new consumer on-line magazine is to be launched in March 2012.
