= Pie shop =

Food outlet

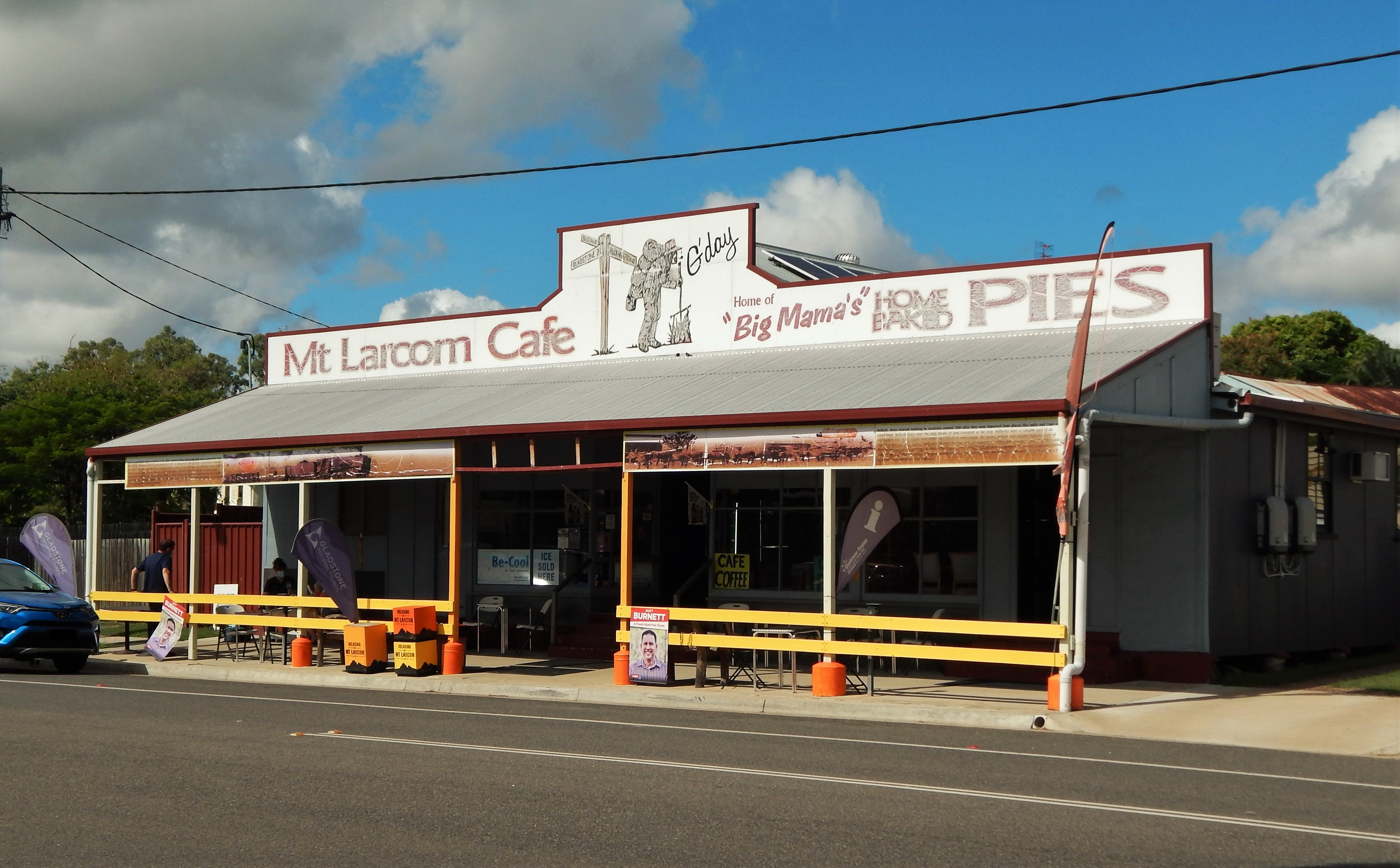
Pie shop in Mount Larcom, Queensland, Australia

A pie shop is a take away (fast food) outlet specialising in pies, especially meat pies. They are common in parts of the United Kingdom and Australia.

== Countries ==
=== Australia ===
A form of specialised bakery, or in more recent times purely a retail outlet selling reheated cooked pies, pie shops in Australia usually sell meat pies, sausage rolls, pasties and other pastry-wrapped baked goods.

The growth of hot bread shops (direct sale bakeries, often franchises) in Australia has largely supplanted the specialist pie shop.

=== United Kingdom ===
Pie shops are mostly concentrated in the North of England, particularly the North West and sell meat pies, sandwiches, fresh soups and cakes. In particular, Wigan and Bolton are home to local chains, including Greenhalgh's Craft Bakery.

In recent years, companies such as Greggs and West Cornwall Pasty Company have taken the business model used by independent pie shops and expanded nationwide.

== Shops ==
- Marie Callender's
- Robertson Pie Shop
- Square Pie
- Yatala Pie Shop

== See also ==
- Fish and chip shop
- Pie and mash
- The Great Aussie Pie Competition
