= Clean label =

Label on a food

A clean label is a label on a food, not listing ingredients that may be perceived by consumers as undesirable. Substances having a negative connotation, for example food additives like food colouring, flavours or preservatives are avoided. The packaging may explicitly display positive claims like 'natural', 'without colouring and preservatives', 'no artificial preservatives', etcetera. The pursued use of clean labels is called clean labelling. The purpose is to give food products a natural, healthy appearance and to stimulate the sale of them. It does not necessarily mean that the product is free from additives, as they can be hidden in substituting ingredients.

== Background ==
The primary purpose of clean labels is to address the consumer's concerns about substances in food that may adversely affect their health. Manufacturers want to present their product as natural and healthful.

From the consumer's perspective, a clean label is a label that is easy to read, without difficult names and incomprehensible codes such as E-numbers. In general, they prefer natural products, free from artificial ingredients and allergens, no use of GMOs, minimally processed food, simple and short ingredient lists and transparent packaging. Consumers distrust colour additives, preservatives, flavourings and additives in general.

Manufacturers may just try to follow the consumer's demands and deliver a healthy product. A clean label may also list deliberately used substituting ingredients that contain the same additives that consumers don't like, for example fruit or vegetable extracts.

There is no exact definition of which ingredients precisely may be included or excluded in a clean label. It might be a product made of just a few ingredients, or that is free from food additives, or from artificial or synthetic ingredients. In European regulation, only existing general rules concerning food additives apply to clean labels. Belgium, however, considered to define a clean label as "… a label that does not include nor contain E-number or legal name of food additives".

== Concerns ==
The "Standing Committee on Plants, Animals, Food and Feed" of the European Commission (SCOPAFF) has stated it considers the use of plant extracts rich in components with a technological function (like preservatives or flavour enhancers) to be a deliberate use of food additives at certain levels of agents or precursors. Hence they should be labeled as such. An example is the use of standardised spinach extracts containing high levels of nitrates.

Consumers may be misled by a clean label if the food contains substances that are in fact the same as official additives like E-numbers while the packing promotes the product as natural or healthful. In addition, replacing additives by natural ingredients may easily affect the quality and the characteristics of the product, as natural products do not have constant quality and levels of working compounds, thus exact dosage is difficult.

German consumer organizations have demanded regulation on the use of clean labels that use claims such as 'without additive X' or use the term 'natural flavouring'.

== See also ==
- Nutrition facts label
- Packaging and labeling
