= Bidnija =

Bidnija Il-Bidnija
- Village
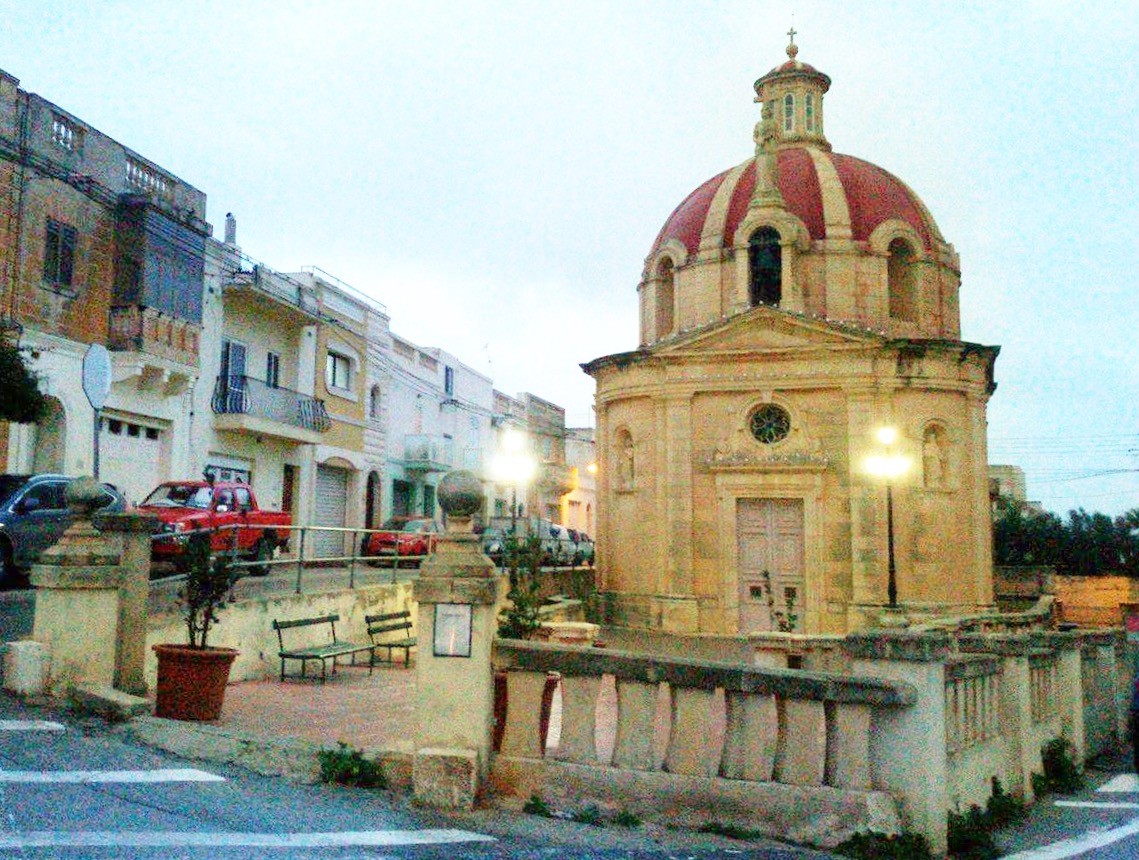
- Bidnija Church

- Location within Malta
- Coordinates: 35°55′35″N 14°23′54″E
- Country: Malta
- Island: Malta Island
- Suburb of: Mosta
- Borders: Mġarr, Mosta, St. Paul's Bay

Area
  - Total: 6.4 km^{2} (2.5 sq mi)

Population (2nd smallest village)
  - Total: 308
  - Density: 48/km^{2} (120/sq mi)
- Demonym: Tal-Bidnija
- Time zone: UTC+1 (CET)
  - Summer (DST): UTC+2 (CEST)
- Postal codes: MST / SPB
- Dialing code: 356
- Patron saint: Sacred Family
- Day of festa: 3rd Sunday of July

Bidnija (Maltese: Il-Bidnija) is a rural hamlet between Mosta, St. Paul's Bay and Mġarr. It is located in the northern region of Malta and is home to roughly 300 people as of 2008. The second least populated habitable zone on the Maltese islands, it is located between two main valleys (Wied Qannotta and Wied tal-Pwales) then extends into other small valleys surrounding the area. It is largely a rural village surrounded by fields mainly belong to the inhabitants, although over the years other Maltese and foreigners have settled in the area generally for its countryside views.

At present, Bidnija is administered by the local councils of Mosta and St. Paul's Bay. It is home to some horse riding facilities, a clay pigeon shooting club and a Maltese cuisine restaurant specialising in traditional rabbit stew. Bidnija's small church is dedicated to the Holy Family and its feast day is celebrated in July.

== History ==
Bidnija is situated in northern central Malta. Bidnija took its name from the 'Bidni olive trees' grove that is found in this village and can date back to 5,000 years. The Antique Olive Grove at Bidnija enjoys Protected area status. These olives are of importance to olive-oil's productivity. Archaeologists and Researchers also believe some Roman remains (e.g. Roman villas; tombs) can be found nearby, as Bidnija makes part of the rural surroundings of Rabat, Malta which served as a City in those ages, and also is not far from the coast of Salina, which was once a Roman harbour.

Along the years, the farmers of the locality built their own farmhouses in Bidnija which nowadays are owned through inheritance by their descendants who still live in the village. It was during this period that the inhabitants which in population were about 25 families, showed their wish to build a church to serve for their spiritual needs. The works on the church's building started in 1920.

In the early 1900s, a number of small rooms were built all around the hill's edges. These served for the British soldiers to stay in watching the Maltese island during World War II when Malta was a British colony. A number of war shelters are also spread all around Bidnija. These shelters served as a shelter to the farmers and the inhabitants of the village during the war.

On 16 October 2017, writer, journalist, blogger and anti-corruption activist, Daphne Caruana Galizia was murdered close to her home in Bidnija when a car bomb was detonated inside her vehicle, attracting widespread local and international condemnation of the attack. In December 2017, three men were arrested in connection with the car bomb attack. Police arrested Yorgen Fenech, the owner of the Dubai-based company 17 Black, on his yacht on 20 November 2019 in connection with her murder.

== Bidnija Church ==
In the 1920s a church designed by mason Salvu Zahra, was built in the area by the inhabitants themselves to serve for their spiritual needs. The church was built in two years and each family in Bidnija decided to donate something to furnish the church. This church is dedicated to the Holy Family of Nazareth. A titular painting, together with two other works in this church were painted by Gianni Vella.

The titular statue of the Holy Family was made by Wistin Camilleri and blessed in July 1977 by then-Archpriest of Mosta, Monsignor Bartolomeo Bezzina, and a procession was held for the first time. The statue was commissioned and paid for by Angelo Galea (tat-Tork) as an ex-voto. The feast with the procession in the streets of Bidnija is celebrated by the people of this village on the 3rd Sunday of July. The first feast was celebrated in 1977.

== Streets ==
- Triq Il-Bidnija (Main Road)
- Triq Is-Sagra Familja
- Triq Tal-Milord
- Triq Il-Bdiewa
- Triq Iż-Żebbuġ
- Triq Il-Ħarruba
- Triq Il-Girna
- Triq Għajn Riħana
- Triq Tal-Karri
- Triq Ta' l-Għażżi
- Triq Ta' Ħal-Dragu
- Triq Ta' Ġebel Għawżara
- Sqaq Ta' San Pawl Milqi

== Valleys ==
- Wied Celestina
- Wied l-Imsellit
- Wied L-Arkata
- Wied Qannotta
- Wied tal-Pwales
- Wied tal-Hzejjen

== Zones ==
- Busewdien
- Għajn Astas
- Ħal Dragu
- Ħanxara
- Ħotba ta' San Martin
- Il-Folju
- Il-Palma
- Il-Qolla
- L-Arġentier
- L-Imbordin
- Ras il-Wied
- San Martin
- Simar
- Ta' Garrum
- Ta' Rkuplu
- Tal-Fjuri
- Tal-Ħireb
- Wardija
