= The Curry Club =

Coordinates: 51°5′22.1″N 0°42′41.7″W

The Curry Club was founded by Pat Chapman in 1982, to further the understanding and appreciation of the cuisines of the Indian subcontinent. In 2007 it became known as Pat Chapman's Curry Club. It gave annual Curry Awards and published an annual Good Curry Guide until 2013.

== History ==
Pat Chapman founded the Curry Club as a hobby business in January 1982 at a time in which little information had been published on the subject of curry and many of the published recipes were complicated and contained hard-to-get ingredients. Based in Haslemere, Surrey, England, The Curry Club was best known for its publications, particularly its range of cookbooks, DVDs, a regular magazine and the Good Curry Guide, a regularly published guidebook, identifying the UK's top curry restaurants. The Curry Club carried out cookery courses, demonstrations, trips to Indian restaurants and tours to India. Curry Club members formed the national network of reporters whose work led to the selection of restaurants in the Good Curry Guide and achievement awards to the top restaurants until 2013.

Until 2006, members paid a nominal subscription to receive a quarterly publication, the Curry Club Magazine, with contributions from members and professionals, including features on curry and the curry lands. The Club held hands-on private and group cooking tutorials at its Haslemere cooking school, and organised gourmet nights at selected restaurants and venues.
