= American Pie Council =

American food organization

- Headquarters: Lake Forest, Illinois, USA
- Key people: Linda Hoskins, Executive Director
- Website: piecouncil.org

The American Pie Council (APC) is a US-based lobbying organization and club.

The organization is based in Lake Forest, Illinois, and offers amateur, professional, and commercial memberships.

== Activities ==
The APC sponsors National Pie Day, which is held twice a year on January 23 and December 1.

It has held the National Pie Championships, a baking contest for amateur, independent, professional, and commercial pie bakers, since 1995. It is judged by volunteers. Recipes become the property of the APC. The competition is open to members and nonmembers and is held in Orlando, Florida. The competition was interrupted in 2021 and 2022 due to the COVID-19 pandemic; the independent and commercial baking divisions were held in 2023, and all four divisions were in the 2024 competition.

== Publications ==
- American Pie Council; Hoskins, Linda (2012). America's Best Pies: Nearly 200 Recipes You'll Love (1st ed.). Skyhorse Publishing. ISBN 978-1620871652.
- American Pie Council; Hoskins, Linda (2014). America's Best Pies 2014-2015: Nearly 200 Recipes You'll Love (2nd ed.). Skyhorse Publishing. ISBN 978-1629146720.

== See also ==
- List of food days
- List of pies, tarts and flans
- Aussie Pie Council
