= Bushing Monarch =

Annual award in South Australia

The Bushing Monarch is an annual title awarded in the Australian state of South Australia to the winemaker of highest scoring individual wine at the McLaren Vale Wine Show. Established in 1973, the winner is crowned the "Bushing King" or "Bushing Queen" until they are disrobed when the next winner is announced.

== Controversy ==
Greg Trott was crowned Bushing King in 1984 following the abdication of Geoff Merrill after the winning wine was found to be outside the parameters for entry.

== Wassail ==
Part of the "coronation" tradition has been the local singing of a Wassail:

'Tis for love of wine we sing,
Glory to the Bushing King,
'Tis for love of wine we sing,
Glory to the Bushing King,
On your feet now, to the beat now
Off your arses, charge your glasses,
Let us make the rafters ring -
Glory to the Bushing King!
ALL HAIL! WASSAIL!

— "Can You Wassail?"

== List of Bushing Monarchs ==
Year	Bushing King	Bushing Queen	Producer	Wine
2025	Giles Cooke MW and Patrick Gilhooly		Thistledown	2024 Thistledown Sands of Time Blewitt Springs Grenache
2024	Paul Carpenter	Alexia Roberts	Penny's Hill	2023 Penny’s Hill Single Vineyard Grenache
2023	Tom Harvey	Renae Hirsch	Chalk Hill Wines	2022 Chalk Hill Tempranillo Grenache
2022	Malcolm Leask and Richard Leask		Hither & Yon	2021 Hither & Yon Aglianico
2021	Zar Brooks	Elena Brooks	Dandelion Vineyards	2020 Dandelion Vineyards Lion's Tooth Shiraz Riesling
2020	Tom Harvey	Renae Hirsch	Chalk Hill Wines	2019 Chalk Hill Wines Alpha Crucis Old Vine Grenache
2019	Malcolm and Richard Leask		Hither & Yon	2018 Hither & Yon Nero D’Avola
2018	Stephen Pannell	Fiona Lindquist	S.C. Pannell Wines	2016 S.C. Pannell Cabernet Malbec
2017	Duncan Kennedy	Elspeth Kay	Kay Brothers	2016 Kay Brothers Griffon's Key Grenache
2016	Stephen Pannell	Fiona Lindquist	S.C. Pannell Wines	2015 S.C. Pannell Touriga Cabernet Mataro
2015	Stephen Pannell	Fiona Lindquist	S.C. Pannell Wines	2014 S.C. Pannell Grenache Shiraz Touriga
2014	Matt Caldersmith and Nic Bowen		Chateau Reynella	2012 Chateau Reynella Basket Press Shiraz
2013	Matt Koch & Randall Cummins		Rosemount Estate	2012 Rosemount Estate District Release Cabernet Sauvignon
2012	Matt Koch & Andrew Locke		Rosemount Estate	2011 Rosemount Estate Nursery Project Mataro
2011	Stephen Pannell	Fiona Lindquist	S.C. Pannell Wines	2010 S.C. Pannell Tempranillo Touriga
2010	Michael Fragos & Bryn Richards		Chapel Hill	2008 Chapel Hill Vicar Shiraz
2009	Paul Carpenter	Alix Hardy	Hardy's Tintara	2004 Eileen Hardy Shiraz
2008	Brian Light	Rose Kentish	Ulithorne Wines	2008 Ulithorne Cabernet Sauvignon-Shiraz
2007	Scott Rawlinson	Maria Maglieri	Serafino Wines	2006 Serafino Cabernet Sauvignon
2006	Wayne Thomas	Bev Thomas	Wayne Thomas Wines	2005 Wayne Thomas Shiraz
2005	Ben Riggs	Annie Riggs	Penny's Hill	2004 Penny's Hill Shiraz
2004	Wayne Thomas	Bev Thomas	Wayne Thomas Wines	2003 Wayne Thomas Petit Verdot
2003	Dan Hills and Tony Walker		Fox Creek Wines	2002 Fox Creek Short Row Shiraz
2002	Sparky Marquis	Sarah Marquis	Shirvington	2001 Shirvington Shiraz
2001	Grant Harrison and Mark Lloyd		Coriole Vineyards	1999 Coriole Lloyd Reserve Shiraz
2000	Ben Riggs	Annie Riggs	Wirra Wirra Vineyards	1998 Wirra Wirra RSW Shiraz
1999	Michael Fragos and Justin McNamee		Tatachilla Winery	1997 Tatachilla Cabernet Sauvignon
1998	Sparky Marquis	Sarah Marquis	Fox Creek Wines	1997 Fox Creek JSM Shiraz-Cabernet Franc
1997	Michael Fragos		Tatachilla Winery	1996 Tatachilla Chardonnay
1996	Sparky Marquis	Sarah Marquis	Fox Creek Wines	1994 Fox Creek Shiraz
1995	Brian Light	Kay Light	Merrivale Wines	1994 Brian Light Reserve Shiraz
1994	Mike Farmilo	Diane Murphy	Seaview Winery	1992 Edwards and Chaffey Shiraz
1993	Nick Haselgrove		James Haselgrove Wines	1992 Haselgrove Futures Shiraz
1992	John Loxton	Maria Maglieri	Maglieri Wines	1990 Maglieri Shiraz
1991		Pam Dunsford	Chapel Hill	1990 Chapel Hill Reserve Shiraz
1990	Chester Osborn	Julie McEwen	d'Arenberg Wines	1987 d'Arenberg Noble Riesling
1989	Brian Light	Kay Light	Normans Wines	1986 Normans Chais Clarendon Shiraz
1988	Bill Hardy	Merrilyn Hardy	Thomas Hardy & Sons	1975 Hardys Vintage Port
1987	Walter (Bill) Clappis	Kerry Clappis	Ingoldby Wines	1985 Ingoldby Cabernet Sauvignon
1986	Scott Collett	Anne Tully	Woodstock Winery	1985 Woodstock Chardonnay
1985	Graham Stevens	Marie Stevens	Stevens Cambrai Wines	1984 McLaren Heights Hermitage
1984	Geoff Merrill abdicated Greg Trott (replacement)	Janet Merrill	Chateau Reynella	1977 Chateau Reynella Vintage Port
1983	Peter Dennis	Marg Dennis	Daringa Cellars	1980 Daringa Cabernet Sauvignon
1982	Iain Riggs	Janice Riggs	Hazelmere Estate	1982 Hazelmere Estate Chardonnay
1981	Geoff Merrill	Janet Merrill	Chateau Reynella	1975 Chateau Reynella Vintage Port
1980	Ken Maxwell	Margaret Maxwell	Maxwell Wines	1980 Maxwell Shiraz
1979	Steve Maglieri	Letizia Maglieri	Maglieri Wines	1979 Maglieri Shiraz
1978	Ken Maxwell	Margaret Maxwell	Daringa Cellars	1978 Maxwell Cabernet Sauvignon
1977	Ian Wilson	Joylene Thorpe	Southern Australian Vintners	1977 Burge & Wilson Cabernet Sauvignon
1976	Graham Beenham	Jenny Beenham	Southern Vales Co-Op Winery	
1975	Graham Stevens	Marie Stevens	Coriole Vineyards	1975 Festival Shiraz
1974	Hugh Lloyd	Molly Lloyd	Coriole Vineyards	1974 Coriole Shiraz
1973	David Hardy	Helen Hardy	Thomas Hardy & Sons	1970 Eileen Hardy Shiraz

== Multiple Coronations ==
The following have been crowned on multiple occasions:

Times	Name	Years
6	Hardy’s-Reynella	1973, 81, 84, 88, 2009, 14
4	Stephen Pannell	2011, 2015, 2016, 2018
3	Sparky Marquis	1996, 1998, 2002
3	Sarah Marquis	1996, 1998, 2002
3	Brian Light	1989, 1995, 2008
3	Michael Fragos	1997, 1999, 2010
3	Fiona Lindquist	2015, 2016, 2018
2	Ken Maxwell	1978, 1980
2	Margaret Maxwell	1978, 1980
2	Geoff Merrill	1981, 1984
2	Janet Merrill	1981, 1984
2	Graham Stevens	1975, 1985
2	Marie Stevens	1975, 1985
2	Kay Light	1989, 1995
2	Ben Riggs	2000, 2005
2	Annie Riggs	2000, 2005
2	Wayne Thomas	2004, 2006
2	Bev Thomas	2004, 2006
2	Maria Maglieri	1992, 2007
2	Matt Koch	2012, 2013

== See also ==
- Australian wine
