= Sammies =

The Sammies are annual awards given by the British Sandwich Association to sandwich manufacturers and retailers. They are celebrating 30 years with the 2024 Sammies Awards.

== Winners ==
Though there are many awards, the main ones are included below.

=== The British Sandwich Industry Award ===
The BSA award is given for outstanding achievement to the development of the sandwich industry.

- 1995: Marks & Spencer
- 1996: Pret a Manger
- 1997: Edward Gibson (Gibsons)
- 1998: The Earl of Sandwich
- 1999: Peter and John Bartlett (Breadwinner)
- 2000: Julian Metcalfe and Sinclair Beecham (Pret a Manger)
- 2001: Hans Blakmann
- 2002: Jim Winship (BSA)
- 2003: Patrick Simpson (Foodservice Centre)
- 2004: Robin Birley (Birley's)
- 2005: Nigel Hunter (Buckingham Foods)
- 2006: Phillip Brown (founder of Philpott's)
- 2007: David Samworth (Samworth Brothers)
- 2008: Fred de Luca (Founder of Subway)
- 2009: Nellie Nichols
- 2010: Alan Dulin
- 2011: Greggs
- 2012: Greencore, Food to Go
- 2013: Joe Street, Fine Lady Bakeries
- 2014: Camilla Deane
- 2015: Mark Arnold, Street Eats' head of innovation
- 2016: Andrew Hesketh
- 2018: Pam Sainsbury
- 2019: Roger Whiteside

=== The Manufacturer of the Year Award ===
Given to the sandwich manufacturer that has made the most technical progress over the year.

- 1995: Joint winners: Toft Foods and Walkers Bradgate Bakery
- 1996: Joint winners: Toft Foods and Walkers Bradgate Bakery
- 1997: Breadwinner Foods
- 1998: Joint winners: Walkers Bradgate Bakery and Gibsons
- 1999: Bradgate Bakery
- 2000: The Sandwich Company
- 2001: Brambles Foods
- 2002: Joint winners:Bradgate Bakery and Freshway Foods
- 2003: Benjy's
- 2004: Buckingham Foods
- 2005: Melton Foods
- 2006: Freshway Foods
- 2007: Bradgate Bakery
- 2008: Melton Foods
- 2009: Greencore, Park Royal
- 2010: Raynor Foods
- 2011: Solway Foods
- 2012: Melton Foods
- 2013: Bradgate Bakery
- 2014: Greencore, Park Royal
- 2015: Melton Foods
- 2016: Joint Winners: On a Roll Sandwich Company and Bradgate Bakery
- 2017: Solway Foods
- 2018: Bradgate Bakery
- 2019: Bradgate Bakery
- 2020: Raynor Foods

=== The Multiple Retailer of the Year Award ===
Given to the retailer who has done the most to promote sandwich sales.

- 1995: Tesco
- 1996: Tesco
- 1997: Tesco
- 1998: Marks & Spencer
- 1999: Boots
- 2000: Marks & Spencer
- 2001: Spar
- 2002: Marks & Spencer
- 2003: Marks & Spencer
- 2004: Boots
- 2005: Marks & Spencer
- 2006: Marks & Spencer
- 2007: J. Sainsbury
- 2008: Morrisons
- 2009: Boots
- 2010: Marks & Spencer
- 2011: Tesco
- 2012: Sainsbury's
- 2013: Sainsbury's
- 2014: Tesco
- 2015: Tesco
- 2016: Waitrose
- 2017: Morrisons
- 2018: Morrisons
- 2019: Marks & Spencer
- 2020: Tesco
