= Olive Oil Times =

Independent industry publication based in Newport, Rhode Island, US

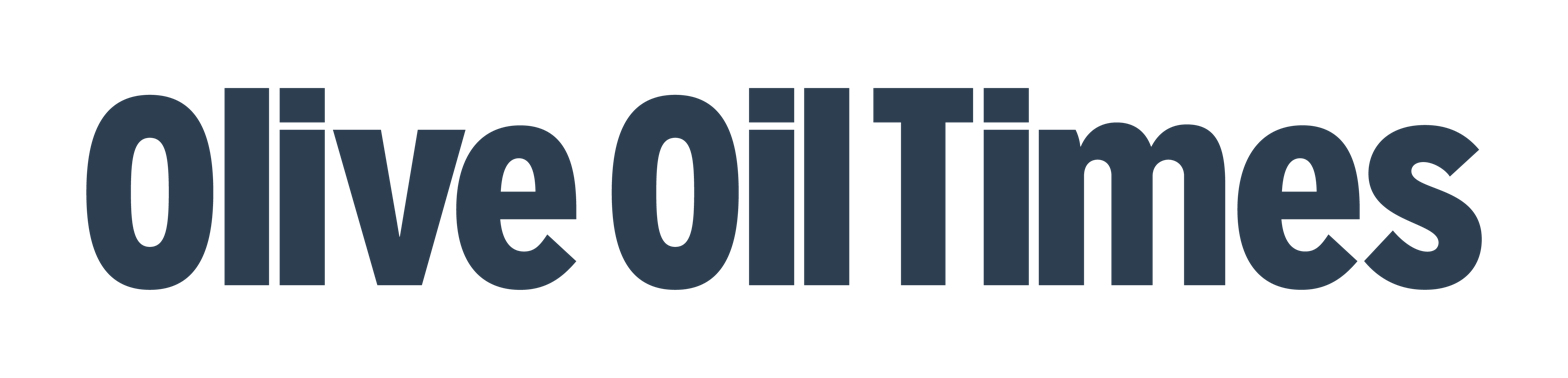
- Founded: February 2010; 16 years ago
- Founder: Curtis Cord
- Headquarters: Newport, Rhode Island
- Website: oliveoiltimes.com

Olive Oil Times is an independent industry publication based in Newport, Rhode Island with offices in New York founded by Curtis Cord in 2010. It is the most-read source of information about olive oil.

The company organizes the New York International Olive Oil Competition, the world's largest olive oil quality contest and has been used as a source for National Geographic, The New York Times, Fortune magazine and the Columbia Journalism Review.
