= Canadian Stroke Network =

Canadian non-profit healthcare organization

- Founded: 1999
- Type: Non-profit healthcare organization
- Purpose: Stroke prevention, acute stroke care, post-stroke recovery delivery, sodium awareness
- Location: Canada
- Services: Stroke care guidelines, research, education, advocacy
- Funding: Federal government, private funding
- Website: www.canadianstrokenetwork.ca

The Canadian Stroke Network (CSN) is a non-profit healthcare organization.

== About ==
The Canadian Stroke Network is a not-for-profit, collaborative effort, with more than 100 researchers at 24 universities across Canada. It began in 1999, with $4.7 million in funding from the federal government. It is governed by a board of directors and has its headquarters at the University of Ottawa.

== Research ==
CSN researchers are involved in writing the Evidence-based Review of Stroke Rehabilitation (EBRSR), a resource that provides a review of the stroke rehabilitation research literature available. They also continue to enhance StrokEngine, a Web-based educational tool which offers an "A to Z" listing of every stroke rehabilitation intervention currently available in Canada.

The CSN currently funds four themes of research:

1. Preventing stroke
2. Optimizing acute stroke care
3. Minimizing stroke damage
4. Post-stroke repair and recovery

== Training and outreach ==
=== Publications ===
The CSN, in partnership with the Heart and Stroke Foundation of Canada, also produces the Canadian Best Practice Recommendations for Stroke Care, published as a website. In 2011, they released "The Quality of Stroke Care in Canada", a report that examined stroke care in Canada. Based on an audit of hospitals across Canada, the study looked at the quality of stroke care provided in emergency response, in-hospital care and in rehabilitation and recovery.

The CSN wrote a book to support people living with stroke. The book, titled Getting on with the Rest of your Life After Stroke, provides suggestions of activities, exercises and hobbies for people recovering from a stroke.

The Canadian Stroke Network was involved in the creation of the National Stroke Nursing Council in 2005, which brings together stroke nurses across Canada to improve training and development. Stroke Nursing News is the publication disseminated and funded by the Network.

=== Sodium ===
The Canadian Stroke Network is a national leader in raising awareness about the health risks of excessive sodium consumption. The Network has publicized findings from studies involving CSN researchers and, with its partners, has successfully urged Health Canada to include information about salt in Canada's Food Guide. The CSN also created a website to inform Canadians about sodium content in food. The website called Sodium 101. A Sodium 101 app, created by the CSN, is available for the iPhone and iPad to further help people track their sodium consumption.

=== Conferences and meetings ===
Each year the CSN works in partnership with the Canadian Stroke Consortium and the Heart and Stroke Foundation of Canada to host the Canadian Stroke Congress. This annual Congress brings together nearly a thousand delegates from various disciplines, including physicians, nurses, students and rehabilitation specialists. The inaugural Congress was held in Quebec City, Quebec in 2010, and was in Ottawa, Ontario the following year. The 2012 Congress will be hosted in Calgary, Alberta.

== Registry of the Canadian Stroke Network ==
The Ontario Stroke Registry (formerly the Registry of the Canadian Stroke Network (RCSN)) was established in 2001 to allow for the measurement and monitoring of stroke care delivery and outcomes in Canadian patients at participating institutions, and to serve as a rich clinical database for investigator-initiated research projects. It is funded by the Canadian Stroke Network and the Ontario Ministry of Health. In 2011, the governance of the RCSN was transferred from the Canadian Stroke Network to the Insititue for Clinical Evaluative Sciences and the name of the registry was changed to the Ontario Stroke Registry.

=== Privacy and Data Security ===
The registry initially required informed patient consent for complete data collection and follow up interviews. However, this proved to be costly and resulted in a non-representative sample of patients This finding was of great importance in informing the debate around the need for patient consent for participation in clinical registries and anonymous databases. As a result of this finding, many jurisdictions now waive the requirement for informed consent for these purposes. In 2005, it became a “prescribed entity” under Ontario's Personal Health Information Protection Act, permitting the collection of patient data without consent for the purposes of improving the provision of stroke care. Since coming under the governance of the Institute for Clinical Evaluative Sciences in 2011, the Registry is no longer a "prescribed person" as it comes under ICES's status of a "prescribed entity".

=== Methodology ===
All consecutive patients with a presumed diagnosis of acute stroke or Transient ischemic attack (including ischemic stroke, intracerebral hemorrhage, and subarachnoid hemorrhage) presenting within 14 days of stroke onset to a participating hospital are included in the registry. Case ascertainment is achieved prospectively by having dedicated nurse-coordinators keep daily logs of all new stroke / Transient ischemic attack admissions and emergency visits. Following hospital discharge, the study nurse reviews the patient's chart and enters the data into a touchscreen notebook computer using specialized software designed to increase data completeness and accuracy. Stripped of personal identifiers, encrypted data are then sent for analysis via telephone to a central data server at the Institute for Clinical Evaluative Sciences in Toronto.

The content was decided after a series of meetings with many stakeholders including researchers; representatives from ministries of health and nonprofit stroke agencies (including the Heart and Stroke Foundation of Canada); healthcare providers; and stroke survivors. The collected data focus on time intervals between stroke onset and the delivery of care including thrombolysis, and include information on patient demographics, stroke type, stroke risk factors, premorbid conditions, stroke severity, brain imaging, treatments (including medications), and the utilization of stroke protocols/units.

Given that the data are collected from a select group of hospitals, a significant limitation of the RCSN is that the results may not be generalizable to the entire population of patients with acute stroke. To obtain population-based stroke data, a supplemental data collection is undertaken biannually — the Ontario Stroke Audit (OSA). Using the RCSN case record form and software, the OSA collected data on a random sample of all stroke and TIA patients presenting to all acute care hospitals in Ontario. Cases are determined retrospectively using appropriate International Classification of Disease (ICD), 10th revision, Clinical Modification diagnostic codes for stroke (I60, I61, I63, I64, and G45, excluding G45.4).

=== SPIRIT ===
SPIRIT (Stroke Performance Indicators for Reporting, Improvement & Translation), is a web-based RCSN Stroke Registry that enables stroke-care providers the opportunity to enter data on stroke patients at the point of care in a timely manner. Data is securely transmitted to a central data repository for analysis and feedback. The data is used to determine stroke care performance in real-time so that hospitals can monitor their own performance and compare themselves to other institutions. The current SPIRIT module focuses on collecting data from Stroke Prevention Clinics and, in development, is the Acute Care SPIRIT module that will allow sites to enter data on their acute stroke patients including patients treated with Telestroke. All data elements included in SPIRIT were derived from the Canadian Stroke Quality of Care Study and the Stroke Canada Optimization of Rehabilitation through Evidence project, which identified performance measures through a series of national consensus panels on stroke care delivery across parts of the continuum (acute care, secondary prevention, rehabilitation, telestroke).

By linking the data elements collected by SPIRIT to performance measures, continuous evaluation of provincial and national stroke care initiatives can occur. The data collected by SPIRIT can be used to inform stroke teams, administrators, provincial ministries of Health and other stakeholders to improve the quality of stroke care delivery. It will also facilitate coordination of knowledge translation and quality improvement projects across Canada.
