= Cobra Beer =

UK beer brand

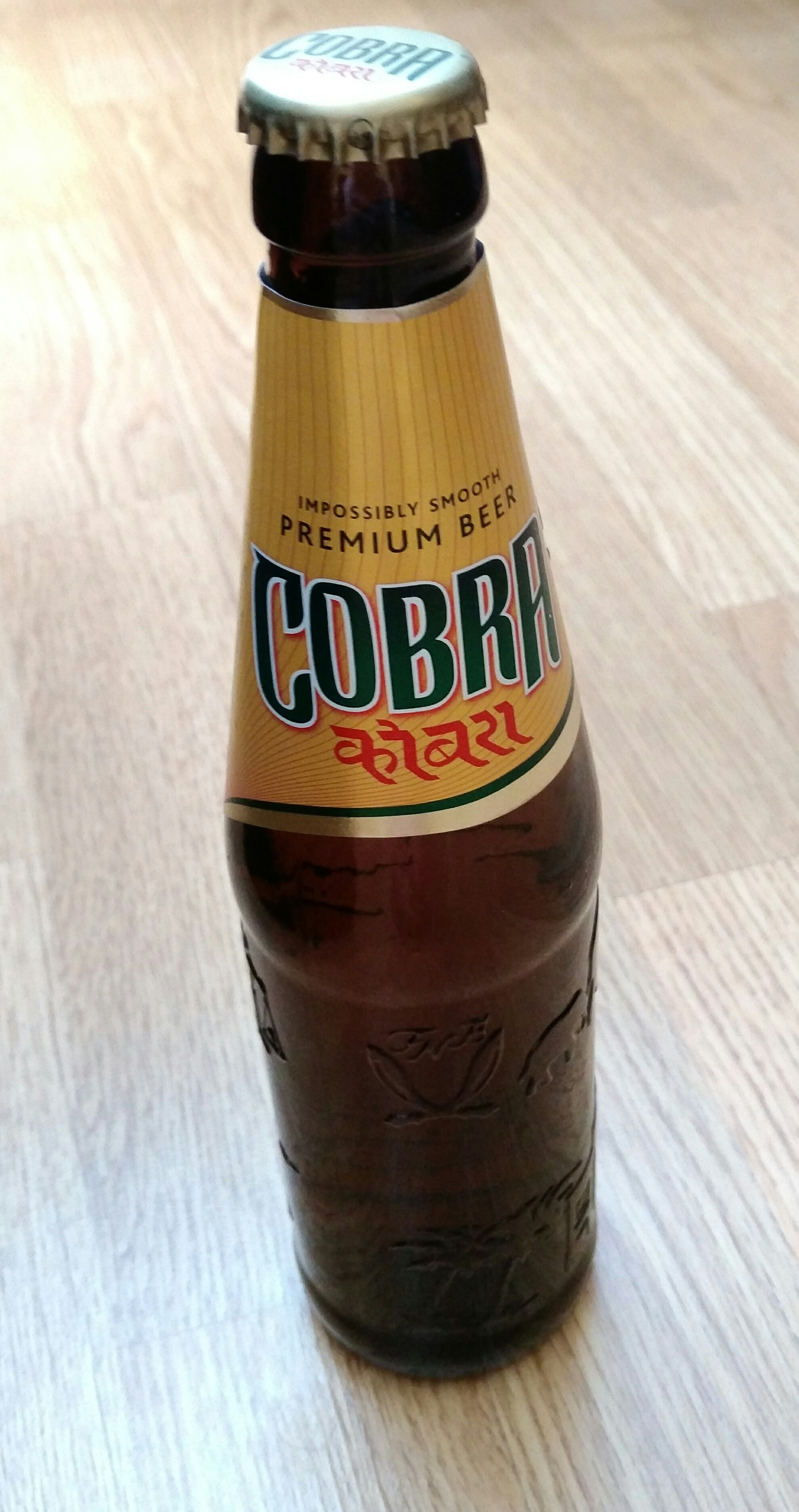
- Company type: Beer company
- Industry: Brewing
- Founded: 1989
- Founder: Karan Bilimoria
- Headquarters: Burton upon Trent, Staffordshire, England
- Area served: UK; Europe; Middle East; East Asia
- Key people: Mark Hunter, global CEO of Molson Coors; Karan Bilimoria, chairman, Cobra Beer Partnership
- Products: Cobra Premium Beer; Cobra Zero; King Cobra; Cobra World Beer
- Website: cobrabeer.com

Cobra Beer is a beer brand manufactured in the United Kingdom. The group's primary product is a premium beer with an alcohol strength of 4.5% by volume (originally 4.8%). The beer was founded in 1989 by Karan Bilimoria and Arjun Reddy. A blend of water, malted barley, yeast, rice, maize wheat and three varieties of hops is used to produce the required characteristics. The bottled version in the UK also contains sugar in its ingredients list.

In June 2011, Molson Coors bought a controlling interest in Cobra.

As of 2014, Cobra Beer is primarily produced in Burton upon Trent, Rodenbach in Belgium and Patna in the Indian state of Bihar.

== History ==
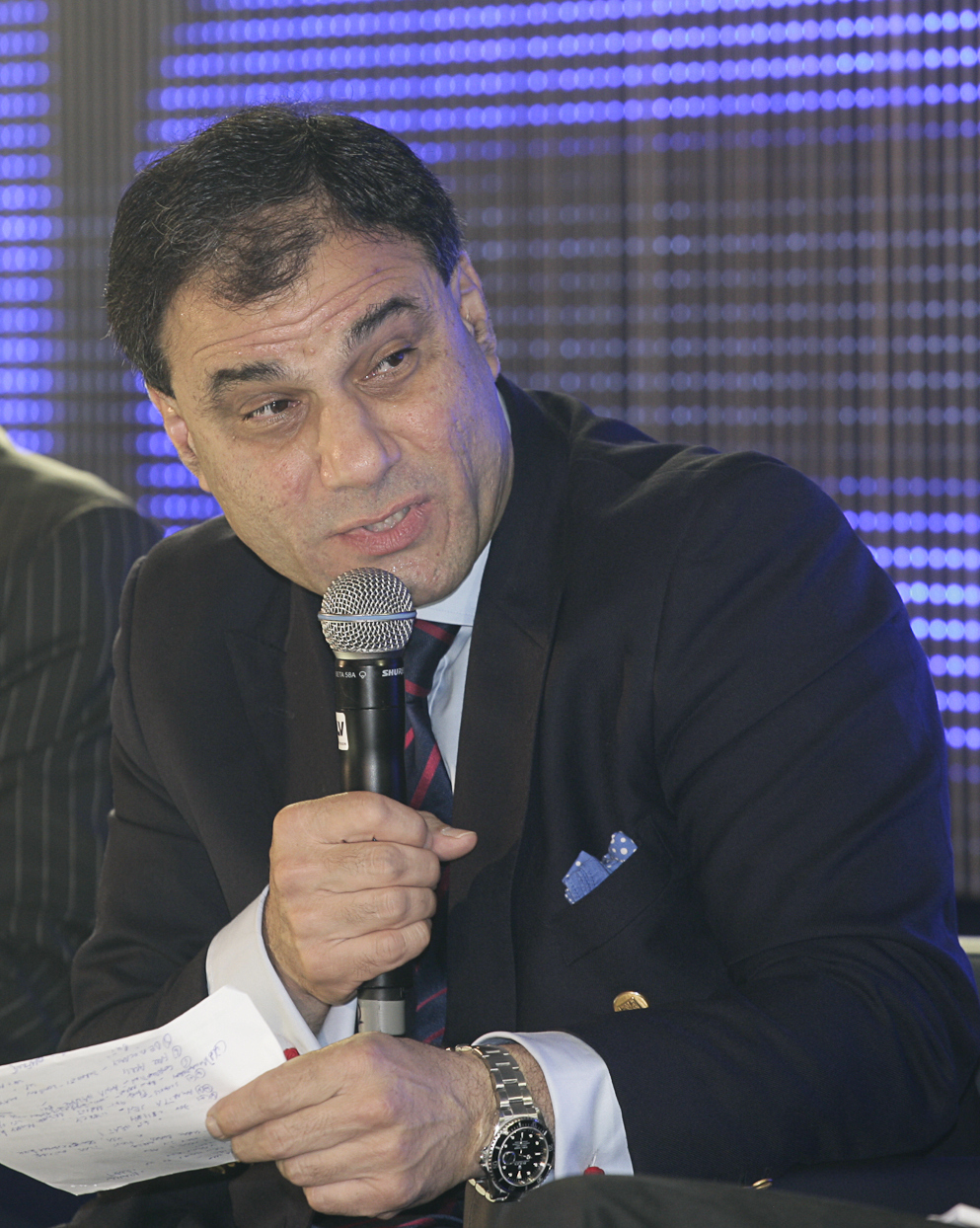
Lord Bilimoria – founder and chairman, Cobra Beer Partnership

Cobra Beer was founded in 1989 by Karan Bilimoria, then aged 27 and £20,000 in debt. Bilimoria said that "the (British) lager was too fizzy, too harsh and too bloating. It meant that I couldn't eat or drink as much as I would like. At the same time, I found real ale to be great in a pub, but too bitter and heavy with food. So I came up with the idea of creating a beer with the refreshment of a lager, but with the smoothness of an ale."

Although originally intended to be named 'Panther', the name was changed to 'Cobra' when a focus group found the latter more appealing. The first shipment of Cobra was imported to the UK from the Bangalore-based Mysore Brewery in 1990, at the start of the early 1990s recession, however, large consumer demand and increased import costs prompted Bilimoria to move production to the United Kingdom in the mid-1990s.

From 1996, Cobra Beer was brewed under contract by Charles Wells Ltd and experienced steady growth in sales for the next ten years.

Throughout the 1990s and early 2000s, Cobra experienced significant growth. In 2005, the company's premium pilsner, King Cobra, was launched. Brewed at Belgium's Rodenbach Brewery, it is currently the only pilsner-style lager to be fermented in the bottle. The company's alcohol-free beer, Cobra Zero, was also launched in 2005.

However, business losses accelerated in 2007 with total losses for the trading year to August 2007 reaching £13.6m on an annual turnover of around £45m. As of 2008, the business was approximately £26 million in debt and had borrowings from venture capitalists attracting interest at a daily compound rate of 15%. Despite this, Cobra continued to report an increase in sales. Cobra's half year sales figures for the period from 1 August 2008 to 31 January 2009 showed growth in volume terms of 21%.

This focus on increasing sales, rather than prioritizing profitability, may have contributed to the company's financial difficulties. On Friday 29 May 2009 the company went into administration, owing an estimated £75 million to suppliers. On the same day, the business was rescued through the formation of the Cobra Beer Partnership Limited, a joint-venture between Molson Coors and Karan Bilimoria, with Molson Coors owning 50.1% of the shares and Bilimoria appointed as Chairman.

In June 2011, it was reported that Molson Coors had also purchased a 51% stake in Cobra India, renamed as Molson Coors Cobra India. The remaining 49% of the venture is controlled by Bilimoria.

As of 2014, Cobra Beer has continued to experience a rise in sales – albeit at a slower pace than during the 1990s. Since the formation of the joint venture with Molson Coors, growth has averaged between 7% and 10% in terms of year-on-year expansion and in 2013 had turn-over of £59.1 million and profit before tax of £7.7 million.

As of November 2014, Cobra had a market share of over 45% of all licensed Indian restaurants within the United Kingdom.

== Products ==
- Cobra Premium (4.5%), an extra-smooth premium beer that is currently sold in 330ml and 620ml bottles. A draught version (4.3%) is also available. It is branded as Cobra World Beer for the UK market.
- Cobra Zero (0.0%), a non-alcoholic version of Cobra Premium, sold since 2005.
- King Cobra (5.2%), a double fermented Pilsner-style lager.

Cobra Beers have won a collective total of 101 gold medals at the international Monde Selection awards.
