= New York International Olive Oil Competition =

The New York International Olive Oil Competition (NYIOOC) is an annual extra virgin olive oil competition founded in 2013 by Curtis Cord, the publisher of the trade journal Olive Oil Times. The 2022 NYIOOC attracted 1,267 entries from 28 countries. It is the largest international olive oil competition in the world.

Extra virgin olive oil brands may be entered in the competition by any company or organization responsible for the brand in the market. This can be a farm, mill, cooperative, bottler, importer, distributor or marketer. The entry fee is $350 before January 1 (the "early registration period") and $400 between January 1 and the close of registration.

In the 2022 NYIOOC there were 1,267 entries and 801 winners, including 543 Gold Awards and 258 Silver Awards. Italy won the most awards (158), followed by Spain (128). The United States won 94 awards, producers from Croatia won 96 awards and Greece won 79.

The winners are announced at a press conference in New York on the last day of judging.
