= Obesity Canada =

Canadian charitable organization

- Formation: 2006
- Founder: Dr Arya M. Sharma
- Type: Charity
- Headquarters: Edmonton, Alberta, Canada
- Website: obesitycanada.ca
- Formerly called: Canadian Obesity Network (2006-2018)

Obesity Canada - Obésité Canada (OC), formerly known as the Canadian Obesity Network - Réseau canadien en obésité (CON-RCO), is a Canadian charitable organization. It connects members of the public affected by obesity, researchers, health professionals and others with an interest in obesity.

== History ==
The Canadian Obesity Network was launched as a not-for-profit organization in March 2006 at McMaster University, Hamilton, Ontario, with funding from the Networks of Centres of Excellence of Canada. In August 2007, the Canadian Obesity Network moved to the University of Alberta, Edmonton, Alberta.

In 2017, it registered as a charitable organization and in 2018 it officially changed its name from the Canadian Obesity Network to Obesity Canada.

== Publications ==
- Canadian Adult Obesity Clinical Practice Guidelines 2020
- Report Card on Access to Obesity Treatment for Adults in Canada 2017
- Best Weight: A Practical Guide to Office-Based Obesity Management (2010)
- Report Card on Access to Obesity Treatment for Adults in Canada 2019

== Local chapters, Students and New Professionals, and affiliate organizations ==
=== Local chapters ===
There are 12 local Obesity Canada chapters. Each chapter connects health professionals and members of the public for networking, learning, building partnerships, engaging in advocacy, and improving strategies to address, prevent, and treat obesity. Current chapters are located in Calgary, Gatineau-Ottawa, Halifax, Hamilton, Sudbury, Toronto, Vancouver, Edmonton, Moncton, Montreal, Winnipeg and Windsor.

=== Students and New-Professionals (OC-SNP) ===
The Obesity Canada - Students and New Professionals (OC-SNP) initiative was established in 2006, and is a forum for students and new professionals (within five years of their last degree) to connect across disciplines for the advancement of obesity education, research, treatment, and management. It is composed of over 1,200 students in undergraduate, Master's, Doctoral and Postdoctoral programs, as well as new professionals in academia, industry, healthcare and government agencies in Canada. OC-SNP holds chapters in nearly 20 post-secondary institutions across the country, which organize a variety of initiatives, including journal clubs, conferences, guest lectures, public outreach events, fundraisers, and physical activity/challenge events (National Pedometer Challenge).

=== Affiliate organizations ===
The Fund for Obesity Collaboration and Unified Strategies (FOCUS) initiative was launched by Obesity Canada, formerly known as the Canadian Obesity Network, with the goal of leveraging resources and expertise from Canadian leaders in research, business and the public sector to raise a minimum of $1.5 million annually toward funding research, education, and outreach initiatives.

Obesity Canada’s everyBODY Matters Collaborative is a multi-disciplinary partnership of weight bias and obesity stigma researchers. The goal of the collaborative is to raise awareness of the existence of weight bias and stigma in Canada, along with promoting behaviour, practice and policy change among stakeholders. Membership is open to anyone with an interest or expertise in weight bias and obesity stigma. Its related initiatives include the Canadian Weight Bias Summits; systematic review of weight bias reduction interventions among health professionals; engaging education theory related to anti-discrimination work and health-related stigmas; and developing weight bias reduction interventions in Canada.

== Past initiatives and current resources ==
Obesity Canada has created a number of tools and resources. Those intended for health care providers include:

- OBESITY+, a searchable database of the current best evidence about the causes, course, diagnosis, prevention, treatment, and economics of obesity and its related metabolic and mechanical complications
- 5As of Obesity Management Program, a framework for obesity management strategies for non-specialist healthcare professionals
- Conversation Cards, a communication tool for health care professionals and their patients
- Certified Bariatric Educator Program, a program of specialized knowledge and competencies in obesity management and bariatric care.
- Perfect at Any Size Image Bank, a collection of royalty-free images of non-stereotypical, positive representations of people living with obesity

Obesity Canada also created tools for use by members of the public. These include:

- Clinic Locator, which helps Canadians find potential treatment and support resources near them (it currently lists 37 bariatric surgery centres, 19 adult obesity management centres, 24 pediatric obesity programs, and 45 certified obesity management healthcare professionals, from all across Canada)
- Tools for Accessing Health Benefits for members of the public who have had their coverage denied from their benefits plan, and includes templates of forms and letters to advocate for obesity treatment coverage, facts on obesity treatments in Canada, and guides to help navigate private benefits coverage if a treatment for obesity has been declined
- other learning resources including webinars with Canadian experts in obesity, videos and infographics on obesity prevention and treatment, checklists to assess the reliability of weight management programs and online materials, among others.

== Conferences and events hosted by Obesity Canada ==
=== Canadian Obesity Summit ===
Obesity Canada has hosted the Canadian Obesity Summit biannually since 2009. It is Canada’s only multidisciplinary all-obesity research and networking conference. It includes dedicated tracts for health practitioners and workshops organized by groups working in obesity. Each conference begins and ends with the Canadian Obesity Summit Awards, recognizing and acknowledging both emerging and professional Canadian researchers whose work focuses on obesity and related comorbidities.

The first Summit was held from May 7–10, 2009, at the Delta Lodge in Kananaskis, Alberta. The event attracted nearly 500 delegates from research, health practice, and public policy. The summit focused on research and health practice in the areas of obesity and mental health; behavioural and biological determinants of obesity; obesity management; and health economics and public policy.

The second Summit was held in Montreal, Quebec in April 2011. Over 300 original presentations by Canadian researchers were made, along with several 'mini-review' sessions by experts on a variety of topics, including maternal and fetal origins; healthy policy and economics; prevention and treatment across the lifespan; pain and musculoskeletal conditions; bariatric interventions; and cancer and inflammation. Notable attendees include Dr. Yves Bolduc, then-Quebec Minister for Health and Social Services.

The third Summit was held at the Westin Bayshore in Vancouver, British Columbia on May 1–4, 2013, and saw over 850 attendees. Delegates included physicians, clinical teams, researchers, industry leaders, and policy makers from federal, provincial, and territorial governments. The program included 70 workshops, hundreds of presentations, accredited courses, pre- and post-conference workshops, plenary, concurrent and poster sessions, awards ceremonies, industry exhibits, and networking events. Primary themes included childhood obesity, bariatric surgery, public health, clinical management, energy regulation, and health policy.

The fourth Summit was held at the Westin Harbor Castle Hotel in Toronto, Ontario from April 28 to May 2, 2015. There were over 870 attendees with 230 speakers from Canada and around the world. The program included 80 oral abstract and 14 symposia sessions, 32 Hot Topics & Controversies sessions, and over 30 workshops.

The fifth Summit took place on April 25–29, 2017, in Banff, Alberta. There were over 500 attendees taking part in 72 oral presentations, 36 Hot Topics and mini reviews, 24 Pecha Kucha presentations, 12 workshops, and 6 lunch symposia.

The sixth Summit was held at the Westin Ottawa on April 23–26, 2019, in Ottawa, Ontario. There were over 500 attendees.

The seventh Summit will take place in Whistler, British Columbia, on April 20–22, 2021.

=== Weight Bias Summit ===
The purpose of the Weight Bias Summits is for individuals living with obesity, researchers studying weight bias, health professionals and knowledge translation experts to share best practices and generate key messages and strategies to reduce weight bias. Ultimately, the goal of these two-day summits is for participants is to be better able to evaluate the impact of these efforts locally, provincially and nationally. The results of each workshop are used in future collaborative actions (e.g. research grants, knowledge translation initiatives to the public, health professionals, and policy makers) to reduce weight bias and obesity stigma in Canada.

- The first Weight Bias Summit was held in Toronto in January 2011. The Summit was co-hosted by the Canadian Obesity Network (now known as Obesity Canada) and PREVnet.
- The second Summit was held in March 2015 in Calgary, Alberta at the Hotel Alma. Forty representatives from varying organizations across Canada were in attendance. Topics discussed included the causes and consequences of weight bias, an environmental scan of existing weight bias-related policies in Canada, and what evidence-based strategies and interventions have been successful in impacting implicit attitudes.
- The third Summit was held from May 26 to May 27, 2016, at the Matrix Hotel in Edmonton, Alberta. The theme of the 3rd Summit was everyBODY Matters, and the hashtag #everyBODYMatters was used on Twitter in conjunction with the Summit. Speakers included members of the Obesity Canada Public Engagement Committee, as well as presentations from the Institute of Sexual Minority Studies and Services at the University of Alberta, the Canadian Diabetes Association, the Weight Bias Network in Newfoundland, and the Rudd Center for Food Policy and Obesity at the University of Connecticut. Presentation topics included weight bias in healthcare and education settings, weight bias reduction interventions among health professionals, inclusive language and policies, critical weight studies, social justice, resources, and stigma reduction strategies from other populations, with representatives from the areas of mental health, HIV/AIDs, and sexual minorities.

=== Annual Learning Retreat for Health Care Professionals (formerly for Dietitians) ===
The Learning Retreat for Dietitians is co-hosted by Obesity Canada and the Dietitians of Canada. Topics covered include the 5As of Obesity Management; the Edmonton Obesity Staging System; the dietitian’s role as part of an interdisciplinary obesity management team; and the clinical assessment and medical management of obesity. The second Retreat was in Guelph, Ontario from January 19–23, 2011. The third Retreat took place in Halifax, Nova Scotia from October 31 to November 2, 2012. The ninth Learning Retreat for Dietitians took place in Toronto, Ontario from October 25 to October 26, 2018. The tenth Learning Retreat is taking place in Toronto on February 27 and 28, 2020.
