= Monde Selection =

Annual non-competitive award created in 1961

Monde Selection is an annual non-competitive award open to food, drinks, and cosmetics products, created in 1961. It is run by the commercial company International Institute for Quality Selections, Brussels, Belgium. Consumer products are tasted and tested in order to grant them a quality label awarded by the International Quality Institute.

Monde Selection states that "This bronze, silver, gold or grand gold quality label can be compared to the quality stars of a hotel or those of the Michelin Guide." However, while both processes are anonymous, Michelin chooses the hotels and restaurants it reviews and pays for everything. Only products who pay the entry fee are reviewed by Monde Selection. Unlike Olympic gold, silver and bronze medals, where only one of each is awarded per event, there are no limits to how many can be awarded in each category.

== Awards ==
All products with a minimum score of 60% receive an award: Bronze for an average between 60% and 69%, Silver for 70%-79%, Gold for 80-89%, Grand Gold for 90-100%. In addition, there are trophies for consecutive years of high quality.

In 2015, 2,595 of the 2,952 participating products (87.9%) received an award. More than half received a score of Gold or Grand Gold.
