= Pasty tax =

Popular phrase used by the British press

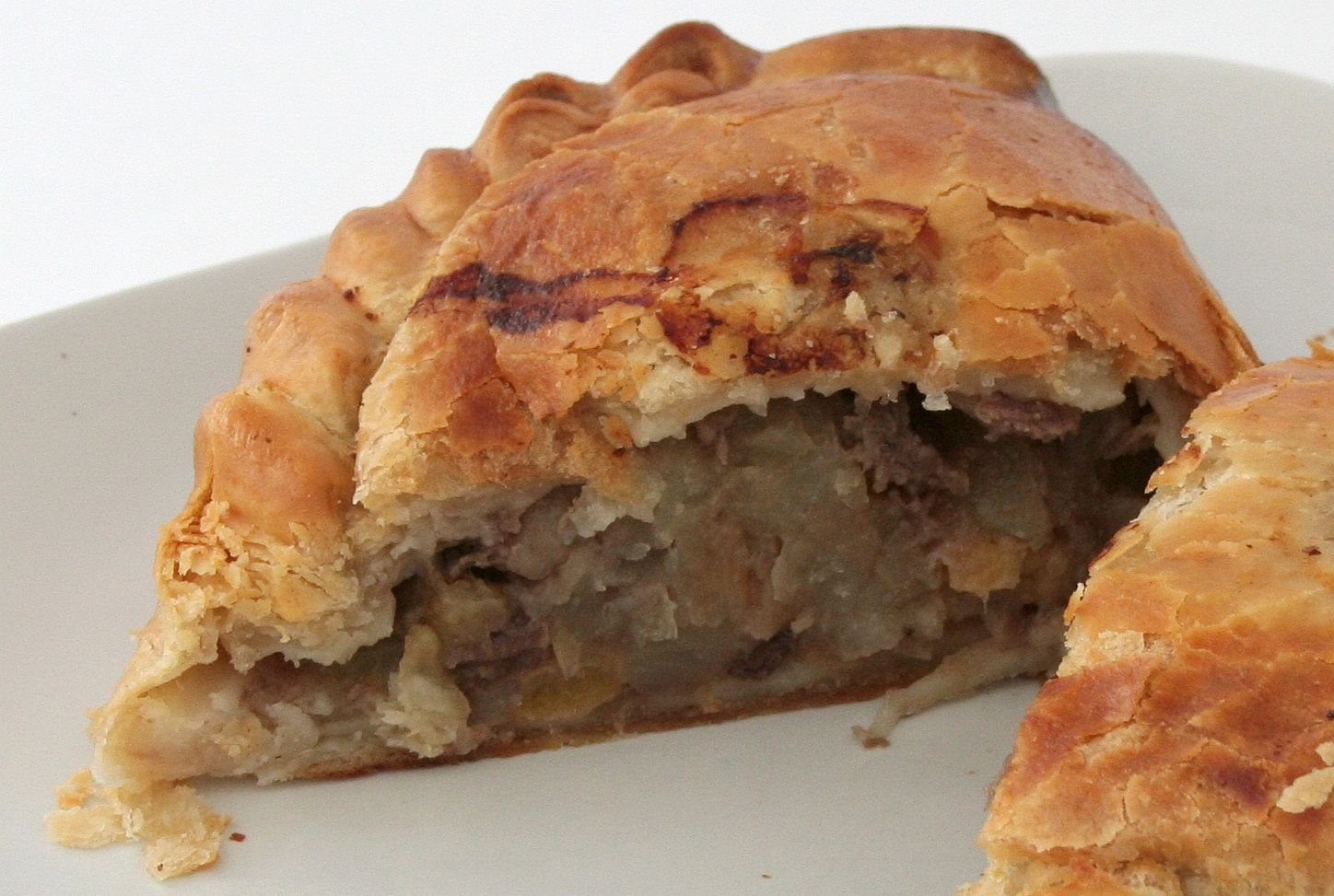
Cornish pasty – cut

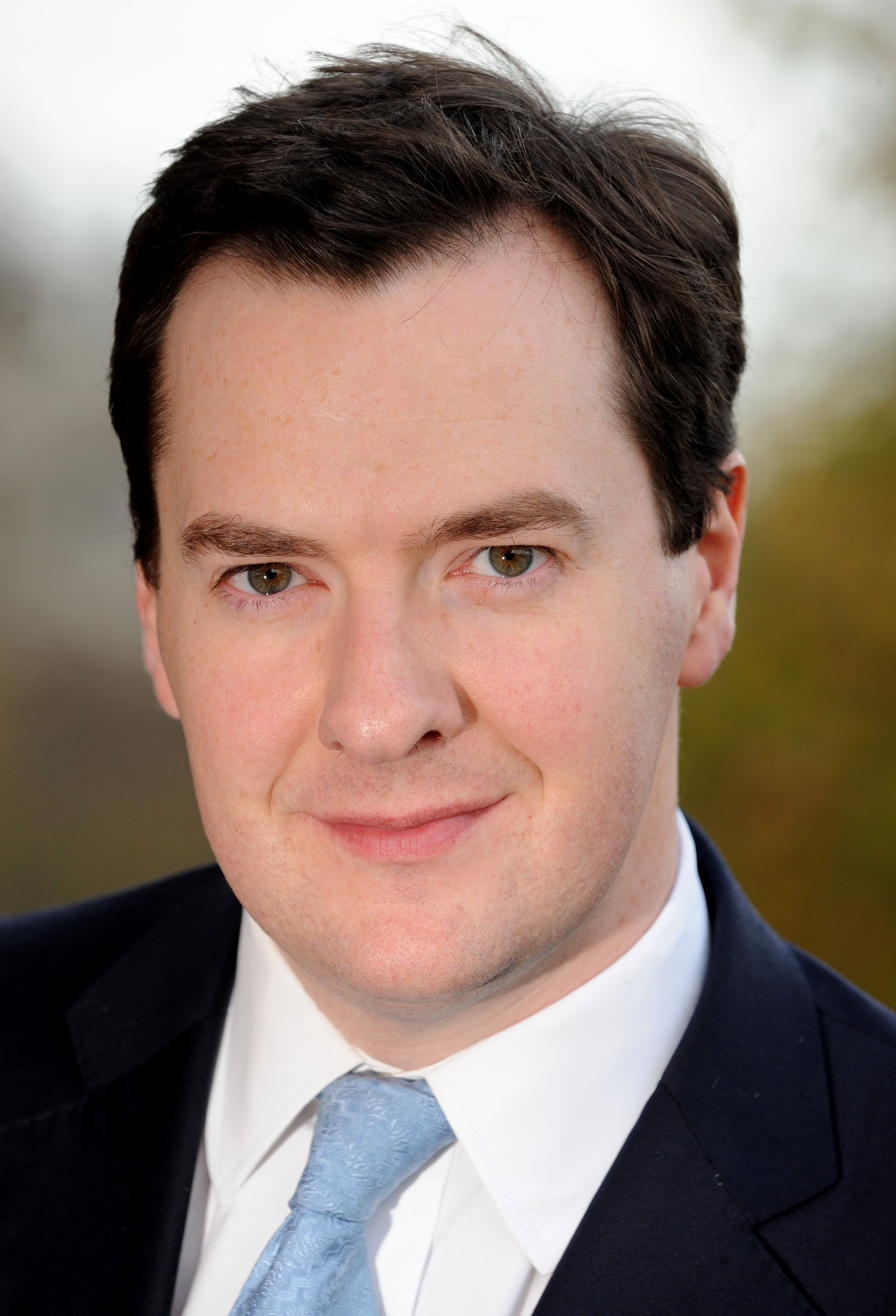
George Osborne, then Chancellor of the Exchequer

"Pasty tax" was a popular phrase used by the British press to describe a proposal in the 2012 United Kingdom budget to simplify the tax treatment of "hot takeaway food" so that value-added tax (VAT) would be charged at 20% in all cases. The change would have increased the sale price of hot snacks such as sausage rolls and Cornish pasties sold on the premises where they were baked. The Chancellor of the Exchequer, George Osborne delivered the proposal of the so-called "March Budget".

== Background ==
Under long-standing VAT legislation, sale of most foods bought to eat or cook at home is zero-rated for VAT, meaning that no tax is charged. By contrast, meals bought and consumed in a restaurant, and hot take-away food or drink, are charged at a standard 20% tax rate. At the boundary between these two classes, there has been a history of legal challenges around food which is baked for sale, and is sold while still hot. If food could be claimed to be hot only incidentally, it could be zero-rated - this would apply to freshly baked bread, but also pies, pasties and similar items. This legislation stated:

4.4 What about freshly cooked products?

If you sell freshly cooked products for consumption while they are still hot they are standard-rated, see paragraph 4.5.

Some of these products are, however, not sold with such an intention. They may only be hot/warm as they are in the process of cooling down. Examples include pies, pasties, sausage rolls and similar savoury products, cooked chickens or joints of meat, bread products and croissants. The liability will depend, therefore, on how you prepare and sell them.

If they are sold specifically for consumption whilst still hot (as a result of being freshly prepared, baked, cooked, reheated or kept warm), they will be standard-rated. See also paragraph 4.5

If they are sold warm simply because they happen to be freshly baked, are in the process of cooling down and are not intended to be eaten while hot; or cold or chilled at the time of purchase, they can be zero-rated.

4.5 What do we mean by ‘specifically sold for consumption whilst still hot’?

You sell food specifically for consumption whilst still hot if you either:

- have an established hot take-away trade and are selling the food as a part of that trade
- advertise it as either hot take-away food or in any other way which indicates that it is meant to be eaten while still hot
- sell it accompanied by napkins, forks, etc to enable it to be eaten before it cools

In the March budget papers, the Government published a paper which claimed:

The borderline between hot takeaway food (standard-rated) and cold takeaway food (zero-rated) has for a number of years been the subject of litigation with some retailers arguing that the purpose of heating their food products is to improve their appearance or to comply with health and safety regulations, rather than to enable them to be consumed hot. This litigation has been decided on the facts of each individual case.

The document proposed to

apply VAT at the standard rate to all food which is at a temperature above the ambient air temperature at the time that it is provided to the customer, with the exception of freshly baked bread. This will clarify the rules in this area and ensure that all hot takeaway food is taxed consistently.

== Opposition ==
In response to the ensuing row, a number of campaigns were launched in order to try to prevent the tax rise on the Cornish pasty. These ranged from The Sun's "Who VAT all the pies" campaign to an online petition set up by the Cornish Pasty Association entitled "Don't Tax My Pasty".

A Labour Member of Parliament (John Mann MP) asked the Chancellor of the Exchequer, Conservative MP George Osborne, about when he had last eaten a Cornish pasty. Osborne answered that he had no idea, and this answer was used to allege that the Conservatives had become "out of touch" with ordinary people. The Prime Minister David Cameron later said that he had recently eaten a Cornish pasty at Leeds railway station and enjoyed it. However, the West Cornwall Pasty Company outlet at that station had closed two years previously.

The issue, which at first appeared to be unimportant, was then taken up by several other newspapers and political commentators. The VAT rise on the pasty would affect both these customers and the pasty industry itself: Greggs, the largest British bakery chain, warned that the tax would harm its business and lead to store closures, and petitions to oppose the tax were signed by over half a million people. These newspapers and commentators made fun of David Cameron's attempt to show himself as a regular pasty eater (i.e. as one of the people) and George Osborne's inability to remember when he had last eaten one. Cameron defended the proposition and said that the move would defend takeaway restaurants against competition from major chains.

The "pasty tax" was one of the issues cited by Leader of the Opposition Ed Miliband when he labelled the 2012 budget an "omnishambles", a word coined by political comedy series The Thick of It. The word saw continued usage in the media, and was included in the Oxford English Dictionary in 2013.

== Aftermath ==
After the public opposition, Osborne significantly altered the plans in late May, which was characterised as a "U-turn". A 2014 study observed that the "pasty tax" affair, although only a small change to the VAT rules, demonstrates that making changes to the VAT system is very difficult, and may itself have caused damage to VAT reform efforts. A separate 2014 editorial argued that the backlash to the "pasty tax" and the Danish "fat tax" have made it unlikely for politicians to attempt to impose taxes on foods thought to cause obesity. However, in 2018 the UK introduced a "Soft Drinks Industry Levy" on sugary soft drinks. Specifically pitched as a tax to prevent childhood obesity, the tax was more successful.
