= Cornish diaspora =

Diaspora of people from Cornwall and their descendents

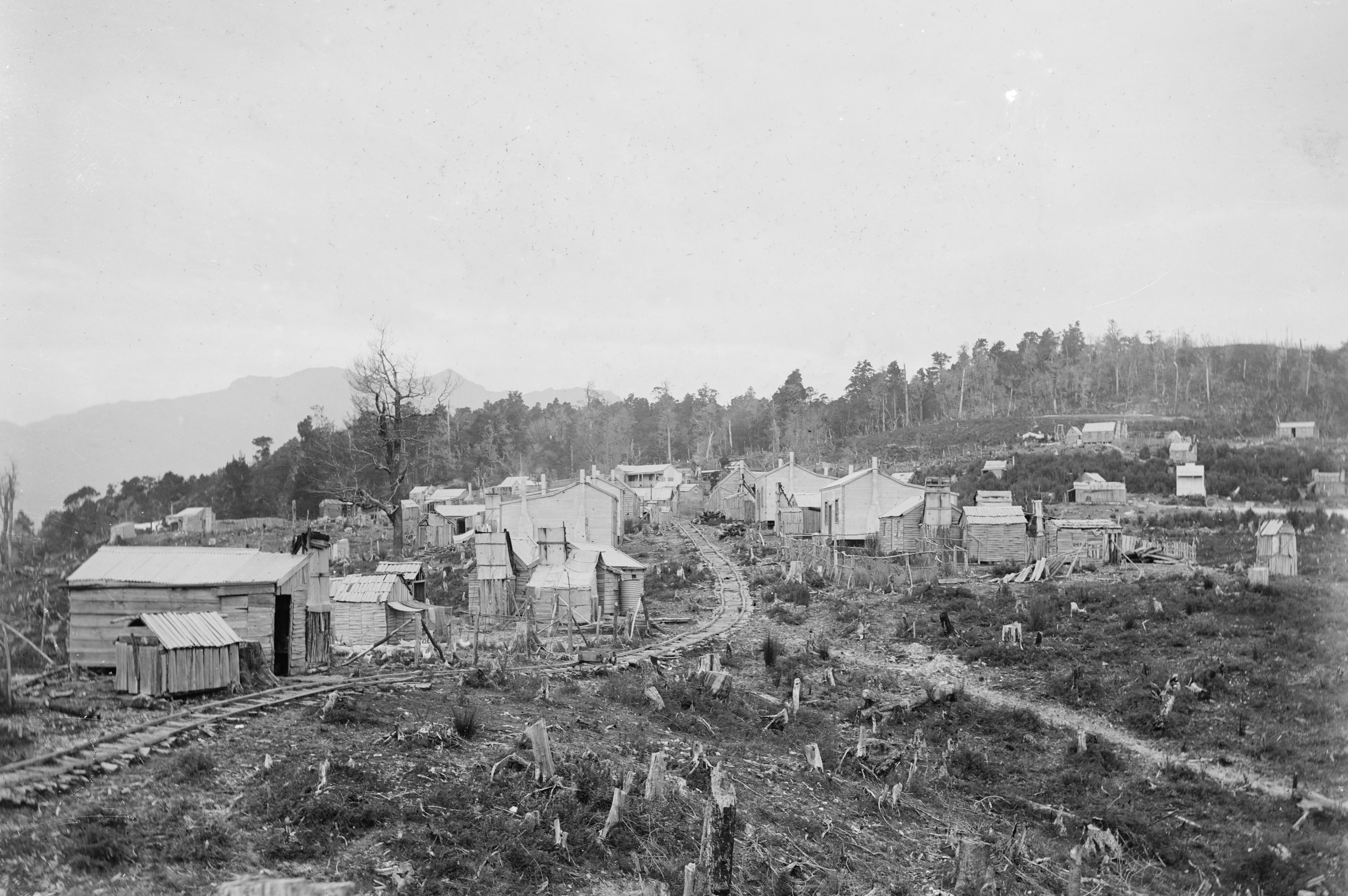
View of Cornish Town, also known as Cousin Jack Town, Inangahua County, New Zealand

The Cornish diaspora (Cornish: Keskar kernewek) consists of Cornish people and their descendants who emigrated from Cornwall, England. The diaspora is found within the United Kingdom, and in countries such as the United States, Canada, Mexico, Brazil, South Africa, Australia, New Zealand, and the Samoas.

== Background ==
Cornish emigration was caused by a number of factors, mainly economic, notably a lack of work in the 18th and 19th centuries. During this period many Cornish people or "Cousin Jacks", as they were known, migrated to other parts of the world in search of a better life. Many skilled miners sought the opportunity to find work abroad, as a consequence of the decline of the tin and copper mining industries in Cornwall. It is estimated that 250,000 Cornish migrated abroad between 1841 and 1901.

The Keweenaw Peninsula of Michigan's Upper Peninsula became the most concentrated destination for Cornish miners in North America following the opening of commercial copper mining in the Lake Superior district in 1844. The first Cornish miners recorded in the region were recruited from Mineral Point, Wisconsin, by Colonel Charles Gratiot, one of the earliest company agents to operate in the area. By the 1860s, Cornish miners had introduced two of their signature technologies to the district: the Cornish pump, a steam powered pumping engine originally developed for the deep mines of Cornwall, and the Cornish stamp mill for ore processing. The Cornish presence shaped the cultural landscape of the peninsula, with Methodist chapels, pasty shops, and Cornish wrestling traditions taking root in mining communities. Today the ghost town of Central Mine preserves a Cornish Methodist church from the period, and two affiliated organisations, Keweenaw Kernewek and the Cornish Connection of Lower Michigan, continue to serve descendants in the state.

The Cornish economy profited from the work abroad. Some men sent back "home pay", with which they tried to help keep their families out of the workhouse. As well as their mining skills, the Cornish emigrants carried their culture and way of life with them when they travelled. They formed tight-knit communities, and maintained some contact with the people and/or the customs of their homeland. Wrestling competitions took place in the new settlements, Cornish Methodist chapels were constructed. Pasties and saffron cakes became known to many natives of Australia, the Caribbean, and the United States. In areas where there are no mines, this may be due to Cornish seamen among the crews of British Royal Navy vessels. In some locations, the playing of brass bands and the singing of Cornish carols shows an example of Cornish culture's influence.

Rugby union was played overseas by the Cornish miners, this helped develop the game in Australia, New Zealand and South Africa. Teams from these nations have returned the compliment, and have played in Cornwall (New Zealand 1905, 1924, Australia 1908, South Africa 1906, 1912 and the Māori in 1926).

== Specific locations ==
Today, in many native Anglophone and some Hispanic countries, some of the descendants of these original migrants celebrate their Cornish ancestry. This is evidenced by the existence of both Cornish societies and Cornish festivals in these countries, as well as a growing overseas interest in the Cornish language. Many of those with Cornish ancestry are now reviving their heritage and a plethora of Cornish family history and genealogy groups exist.

=== Australia ===
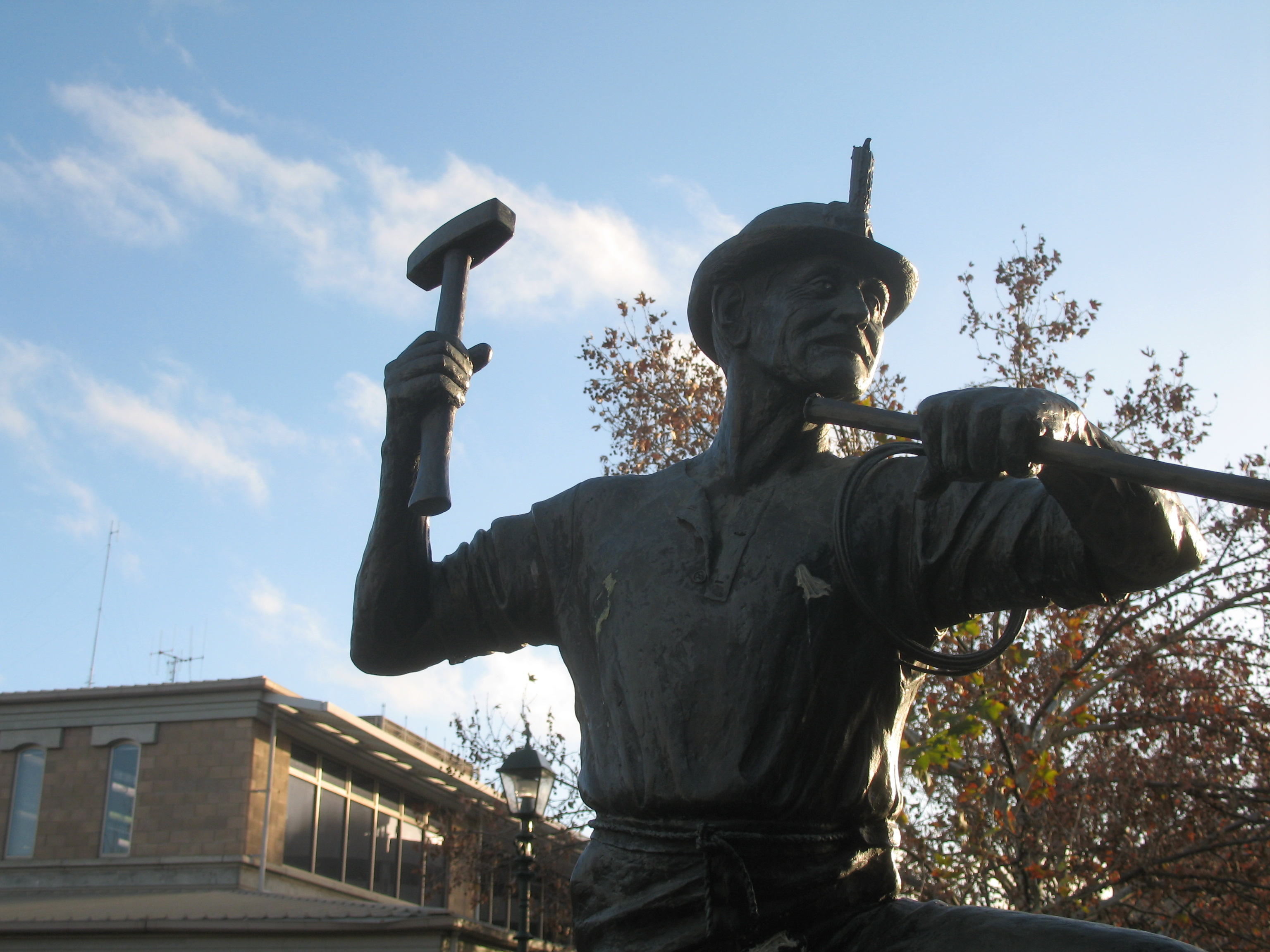
A statue commemorating Cornish and German miners in Bendigo, Victoria, Australia

Today the most famous area of Cornish culture, called 'Australia's Little Cornwall', is the area in South Australia known as the Copper Triangle. This mining area in the northern Yorke Peninsula, including the principal towns of Moonta, Kadina and Wallaroo, was a source of prosperity for colonial South Australia in the late 19th and early 20th centuries. In its heyday Moonta was South Australia's second largest town after Adelaide and was predominately settled by Cornish miners and their families. Today Moonta is most famous for its traditional Cornish pasties and its Cornish style mine engine houses. Many descendants of these Cornish families still live in the Copper Triangle and are intensely proud of their Cornish heritage. Many of the original miners' cottages made from wattle and daub still stand and are still lived in by local residents, and many streets and houses have Cornish names. In Moonta today, the Kernewek Lowender (Cornish for "Cornish happiness") is the largest Cornish festival in the world and attracts more than 40,000 visitors each event.

The South Australian town of Burra also has Cornish connections. Burra began with the discovery of copper in 1845, by shepherds Thomas Pickett and William Streair. A number of townships soon developed - the South Australian Mining Association town of Kooringa, plus Redruth (Cornish) Aberdeen (Scottish) Llywchwr (Welsh) and Hampton (English). This former copper mining town is listed on the National Estate Register and also declared a State Heritage Area. The great Burra Jinker holds pride of place in Market Square. It was once pulled by some 40 bullocks, four abreast. Straining to the vivid exhortations of six bullock drivers under the leadership of William Woollacott, they hauled the massive jinker for three months, on a 100-mile journey from Adelaide. In April 2001 the Jinker was included in the BankSA Heritage Icons List.

An example of the extent of the Cornish diaspora are the miners who worked at the Geraldine mine in Western Australia and had an influence on the nearby town of Northampton. Their produce was shipped out of Port Gregory, Western Australia in small vessels like the tramp steamer SS Xantho and then transhipped to the port of Geraldton where it was loaded onto wool ships bound for England as a form of 'paying ballast'.

Two of Australia's prime ministers are known to have Cornish ancestry. Robert Menzies was partially Cornish, while Bob Hawke was entirely of Cornish descent. In addition, at least six Premiers of South Australia have been of Cornish origin. Ruse, New South Wales was named after James Ruse, known as Australia's first farmer, who had been transported from Cornwall.

=== Brazil ===
Cornish miners played a major role in gold mining in imperial Brazil. The Gongo Soco gold mine, operated by the Imperial Brazilian Mining Association of Cornwall using skilled Cornish miners, produced over 12,000 kilograms (26,000 lb) of gold between 1826 and 1856. Of particular note was Cornish miner Thomas Bawden (Scorrier, 1814-Mariana, Brazil, 1886), who had migrated to Brazil as a young man to make his fortune, and who on June 1, 1859 bought, for a very modest price, the gold ore exploring rights of "Mina da Passagem" (in Mariana, the first city and first capital of Minas Gerais Province), then believed to be practically exhausted, from the estate of then recently deceased mineralogy pioneer Baron von Eschwege (Wilhelm Ludwig Freiherr von Eschwege, a German engineer who had been charged by the King, D. João VI, to survey Brazilian mineral resources and establish ways of exploitation. See Eschwege's book: Pluto Brasiliensis). After more than four years managing the enterprise, Bawden, now a successful businessman, sold the whole of it, for a remarkably high price, to the newly constituted single-purpose business "Anglo-Brazilian Gold Mining Company", managed by the experienced Thomas Treloar (Sithney, 1814-London, 1880), who also came from Cornwall. The company received, in 1867, the official visit of Sir Richard Francis Burton, former Africa and Middle East explorer, then acting as consul to Brazil within the British diplomatic service. Consul Burton, a renowned linguist and intellectual as well, described (in the book Explorations of the Highlands of Brazil, 1869) how he had found there a large Cornish community, whose church services included hymns sung in the Cornish language, and had witnessed their eccentric rite of "Baptism for the dead", based on the apostle Paul's First Epistle to the Corinthians 15:29. The "Anglo-Brazilian" project turned out to be a success and, using newly developed Cornish gold extraction engineering technologies, the "Mina da Passagem" eventually kept producing large amounts of gold for around ninety years more.

=== Canada ===
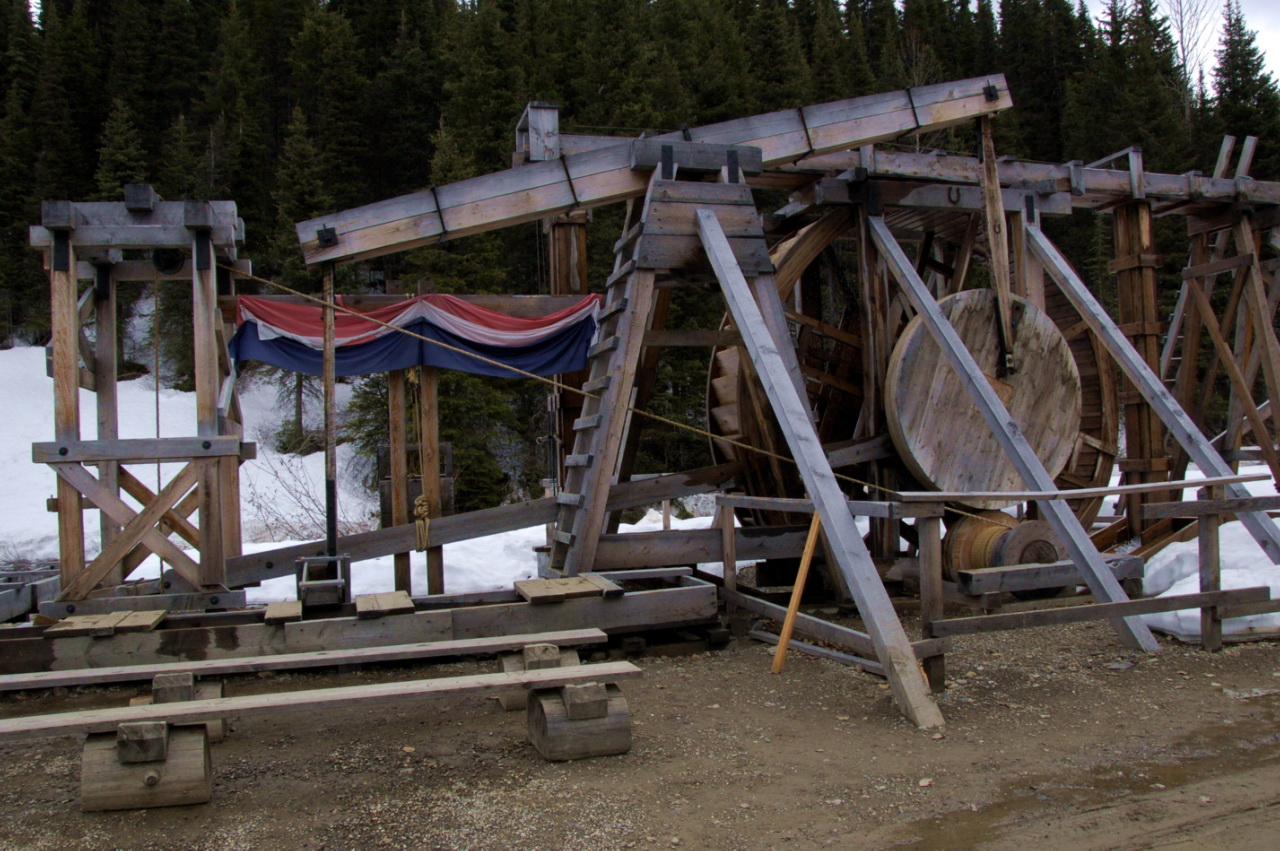
A Cornish water wheel in British Columbia

The oldest and largest area of settlement from the West Country in Canada is that of the northern shore of Newfoundland, also known as the French Shore, due to competing fishing rights. The Cornish made up a significant part of this population, which is noticeable in the local dialect to this day. There are also significant populations of Cornish descent in other areas of Atlantic Canada, in particular, Prince Edward Island. In the first half of the 19th century Padstow was a significant port of embarcation for Cornish emigrants bound for Canada. During the mid-19th century, ships carrying timber from Canada (particularly Quebec City) arrived at Padstow and offered cheap travel to passengers wishing to emigrate. Among the ships that sailed were the barques Clio, Belle and Voluna; and the brig Dalusia. In Ontario, Oshawa and the surrounding Ontario County were the settling grounds of a large number of 19th century Cornish immigrants during the Cornish emigration which considerably reduced Cornwall's population, although these were largely agricultural workers, rather than miners. Bruce mines in Ontario was an exception where Cornish mine workers started the first commercial copper mine in Canada.There were also major Cornish settlements in the Prairie provinces, and on Vancouver Island.

Cornish ethnicity is recognised on the Canadian census, and in 2006 1,550 Canadians listed their ethnic origin as Cornish.

The name of Cornwall, Ontario however does not indicate settlement by Cornish people since it was named after one of the Dukes of Cornwall (its flag and coat of arms are therefore based on elements from the Duchy of Cornwall).

=== Mexico ===
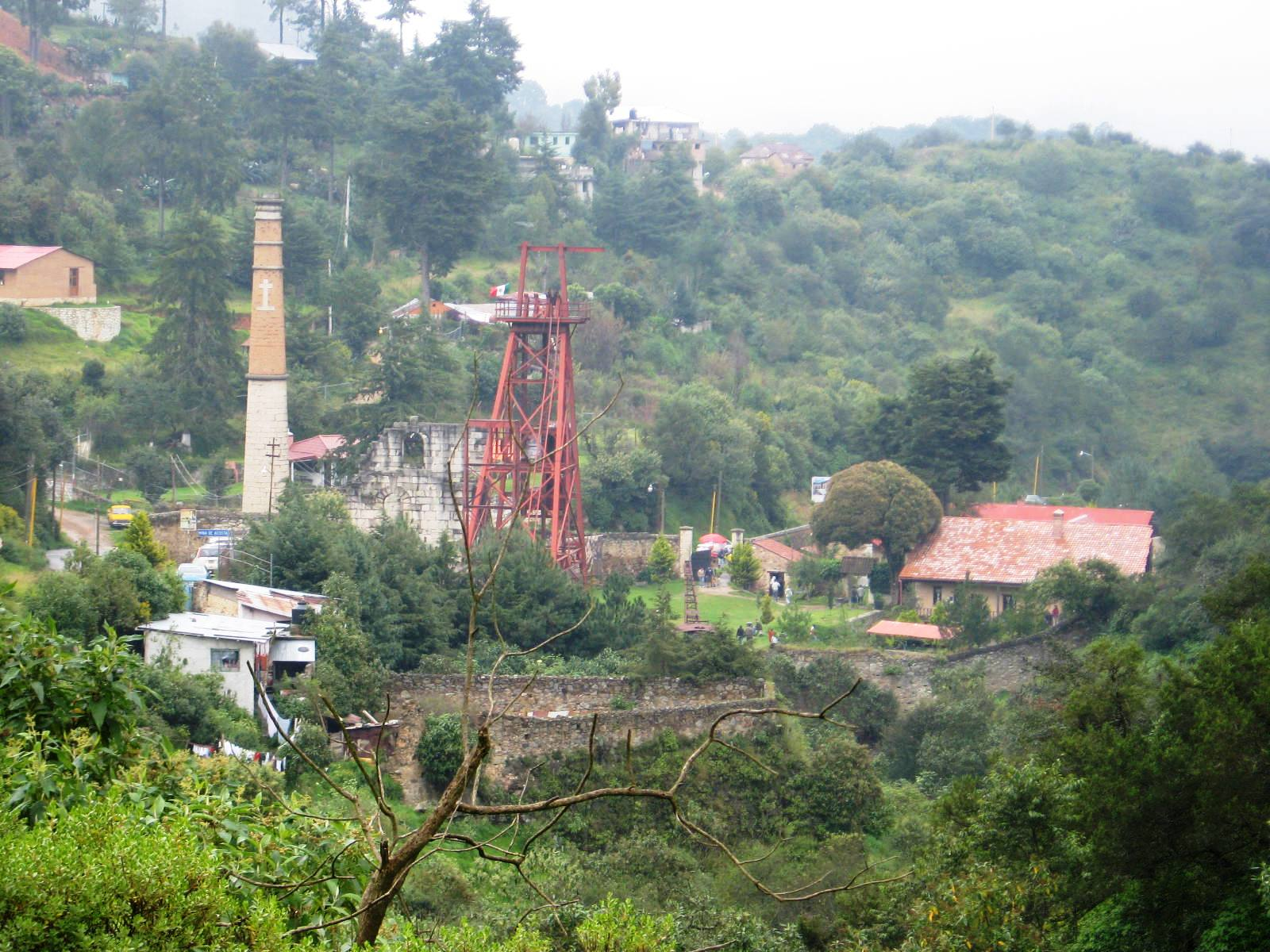
A Cornish mine in Mineral del Monte, Hidalgo, Mexico

In the State of Hidalgo in central Mexico a local speciality originates from the Cornish pasty, called pastes which was introduced by miners and workers from Cornwall who were contracted in the silver mining towns of Mineral del Monte and Pachuca. The majority of migrants to this region came from Camborne and Redruth. Mineral del Monte's steep streets, stairways and small squares are lined with low buildings and many houses with high sloping roofs and chimneys which indicate a Cornish influence. It was the Cornish who first introduced football to Pachuca and indeed Mexico, as well as other popular sports such as Rugby union, Tennis, Cricket, and Polo, while Mexican remittances helped to build the Wesleyan Chapel in Redruth the 1820s. The twin silver mining settlements of Pachuca and Real del Monte are being marketed in 2007 as 'Mexico's Little Cornwall' by the Mexican Embassy in London and represent the first attempt by the Spanish speaking part of the Cornish diaspora to establish formal links with Cornwall. The Mexican Embassy in London is also trying to establish a town twinning arrangement with Cornwall. In 2008 thirty members of the Cornish Mexican Cultural Society travelled to Mexico to try and re-trace the path of their ancestors who set off from Cornwall to start a new life in Mexico.

=== New Zealand ===
During the 1870s and 1880s, New Zealand had an immigrant drive spearheaded by Sir Julius Vogel of the New Zealand Government. At that time Vogel recognised that the young colony needed labourers, farmers and domestic servants to "bring the country in". Vogel initiated the Vogel Immigration Scheme (1871–1888) in which any New Zealand resident could nominate any British resident to immigrate to New Zealand for free if they qualified under the criteria. The criteria were for fit, healthy, young people with primarily labouring, farming or domestic servant skills. The recruiters were told to focus on Cornish and Scots who were known for their hard work ethic and were therefore deemed particularly ideal for colonial life. As the timing coincided with the downturn of the Cornish tin market, a large number of Cornish took up the offer. Many Cornish went to Auckland, Wellington, or Lyttelton (Christchurch), New Zealand. Many Scots went to Dunedin, New Zealand. Peak immigration under the scheme occurred between 1872 and 1874. Records of those who emigrated under the scheme still exist and can be searched at most large New Zealand public libraries.

Thomas (born 1888) and Annie (born 1887) Bennett were two who made the journey from Cornwall to Aotearoa New Zealand. They settled in Morrinsville in the Waikato region. One of their daughters, Gladys, married Reg Pedley. Gladys and Reg moved to the Manawatū to a life of mostly dairy farming. Their eight offspring continue to celebrate their Cornish roots to this day. Thomas and Annie are interred together in the Piako Cemetery in Morrinsville, Waikato.

The suburb of Redruth in Timaru is named after Redruth in Cornwall.

=== Pitcairn Islands and Norfolk Island ===
One of the nine mutineers who arrived on the Pitcairn Islands in 1790, Matthew Quintal, was a Cornish man. He was one of the only mutineers to have children before his death, being partially responsible for the island continuing to have a population after the deaths of all the original arrivals on HMS Bounty. Consequently, due to the island's small and often intermingling population, which has experienced very little change in several hundred years, most of its inhabitants partially descend from him to this day. Due to a number of inhabitants of Pitcairn being moved to Norfolk Island in later years, a significant number of his descendants carrying Cornish ancestry live here too.

=== South Africa ===
During the gold rush period on the Witwatersrand many Cornishmen went to the then South African Republic (also known as the Transvaal) in order to seek their fortune. In fact, the pioneering of the Rand gold reef was largely down to the hardrock mining expertise that Cornishmen brought with them from their native country, where tin and copper had been obtained from granite for many centuries. By the end of the 19th century the sheer numbers of Cornish miners on the Rand, sending up to £1 million a year back to Cornwall, even caused friction with the Kruger government which resented the wealth these "uitlanders" were sending home. The Kruger government's decision to tax these so-called uitlanders without any kind of legislative representation was one of the many reasons behind the outbreak of the Second Boer War. "Cousin Jack", as the Cornishman was known, also brought a strong rugby tradition, the Cornish pasty and a few other elements of Cornish culture to South Africa that can still be found today. Indeed, there is an area known as New Redruth in Johannesburg and one area of Soweto bears a Cornish language name, Baragwanath. Later Cornish migration to South Africa could be viewed as part of a more general trend of emigration from the British Isles and is thus harder to gauge. The prevalence of Cornish surnames, e.g. Tregowning, amongst people of all races, especially in the Cape of Good Hope, is further testimony to the Cornish contribution to South Africa.

=== United Kingdom ===
Cornish people have also moved to a number of other parts of England and the rest of the United Kingdom. Close to the Cornish county border with Devon is the naval city of Plymouth which has had an influx of Cornish people since time immemorial and, during the rise of Devonport Dockyard, was a source of income for many Cornishmen. Historically the surname Cornish/Cornishe/Cornyshe was given to a Cornish person who had left Cornwall and this surname can be found throughout the British Isles. Today there are significant Cornish populations in Plymouth, Bristol and the capital, London, which is also home to London Cornish RFC. Within Great Britain, Cornish families were attracted from Cornwall to North East England—-particularly on Teesside, East Cleveland—-to partake in ironstone and alum mining (see:Ironstone mining in Cleveland and North Yorkshire), as a means to earn wealth by using their mining skill. This has resulted in a concentration of Cornish names on and around Teesside that persists into the 21st century. Other areas settled by Cornish miners were Roose in Cumbria and parts of south Wales. In addition Cornish farming families took advantage of cheap agricultural land to relocate to north west Essex, specifically the Great Dunmow area, where the surrounding villages of Stebbing and Lindsell boast descendants with Cornish surnames such as Lanyon, Menhinick and Trembath.

=== United States ===
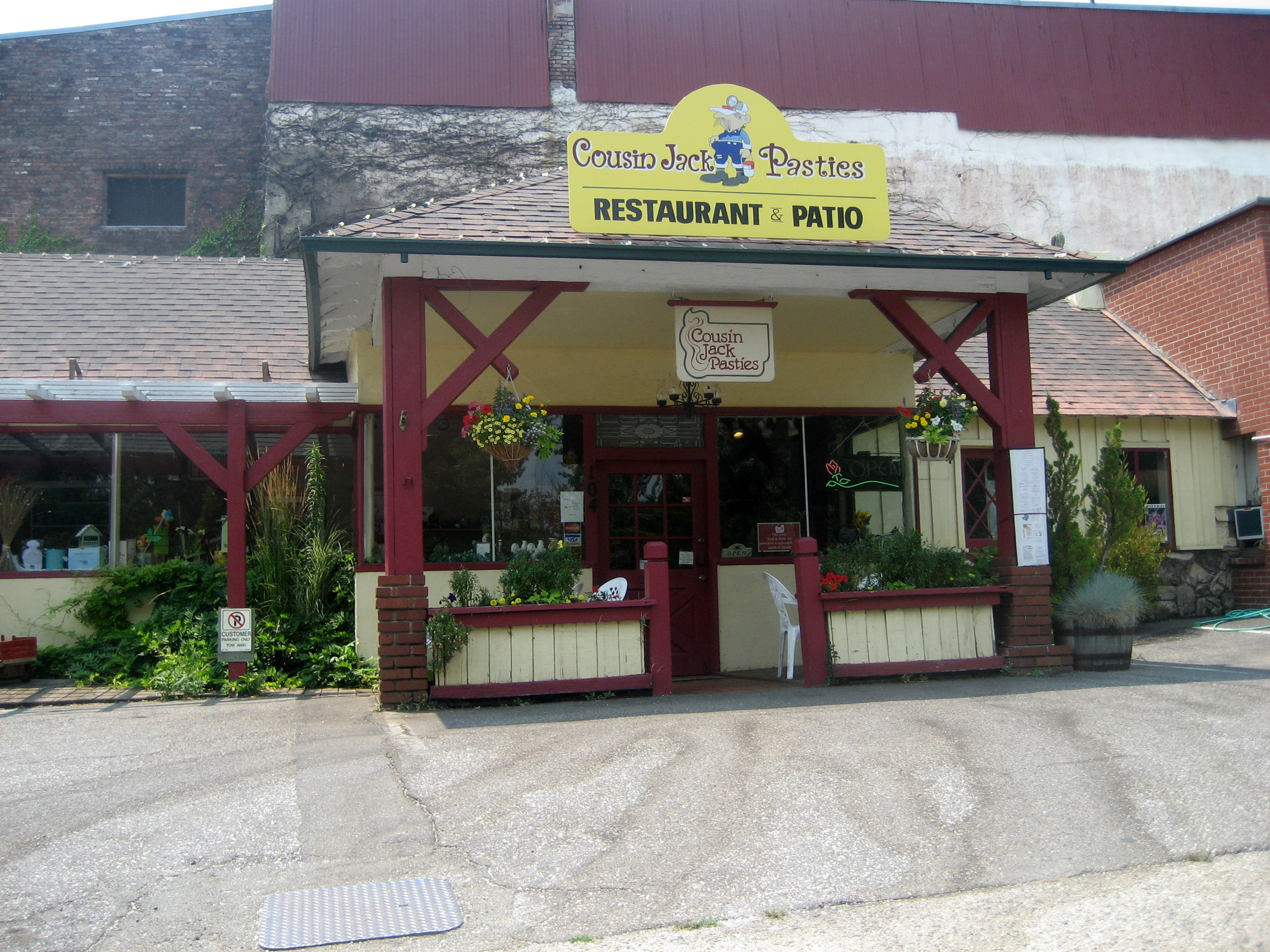
A "Cousin Jack's" pasty shop in Grass Valley, California circa 2008

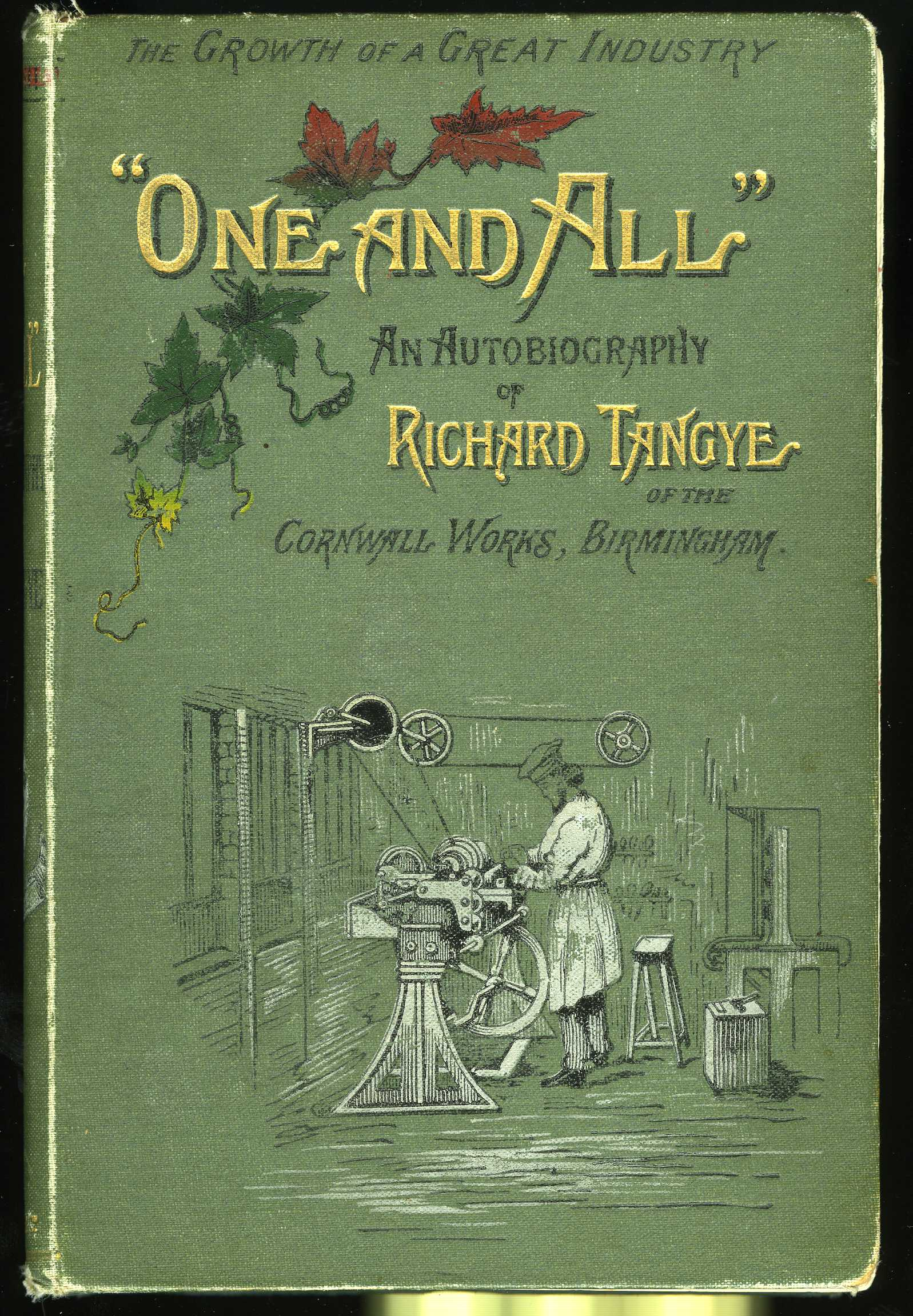
Cover of "One and All": an autobiography of Richard Tangye, of the Cornwall Works, Birmingham

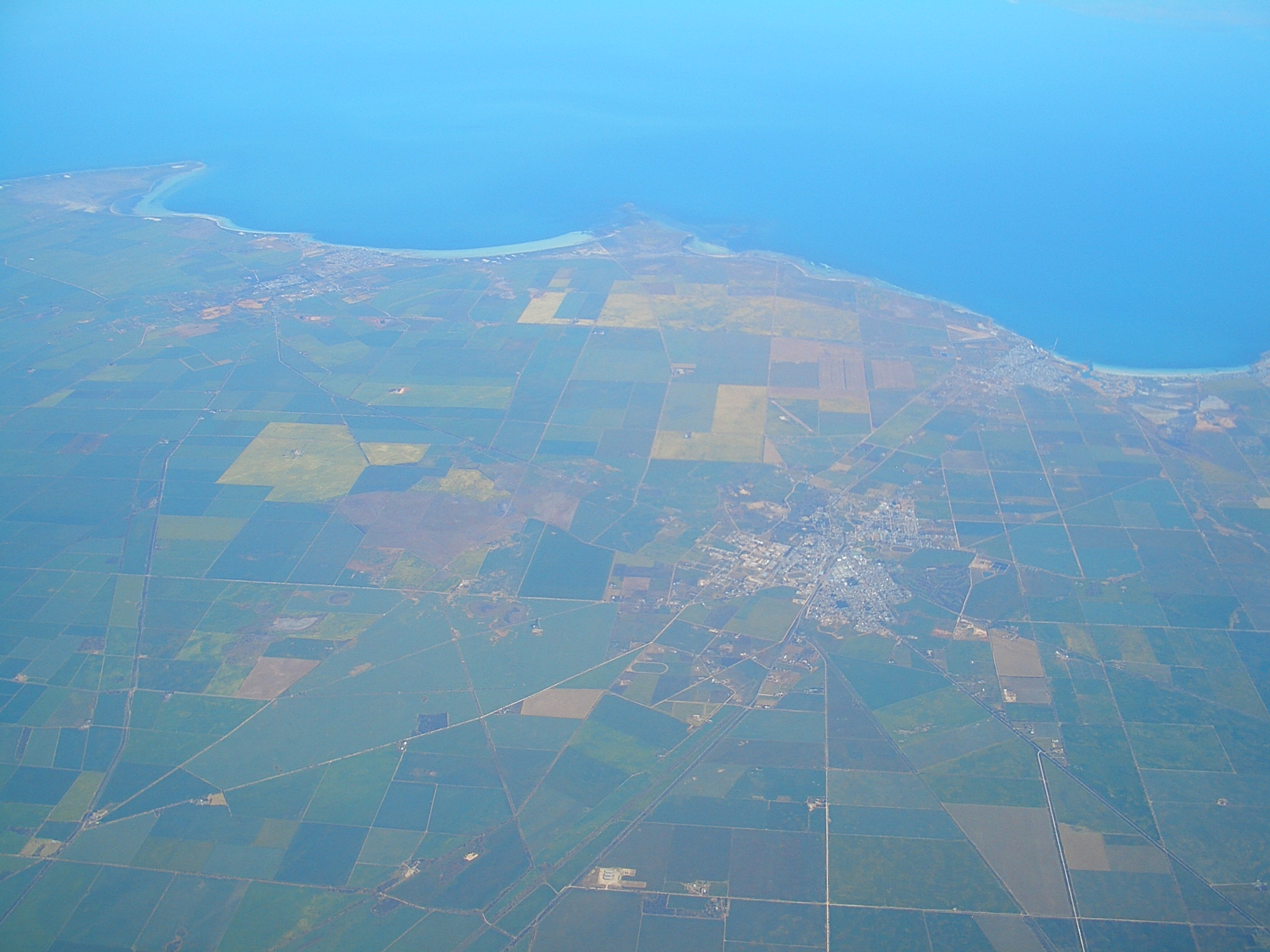
Aerial view of the Copper Triangle, South Australia, looking roughly west. Kadina is in the centre (inland), Wallaroo and Moonta on the coast (right and left, respectively)

There are estimated to be close to 2 million people of Cornish descent in the US. Cornish culture continues to have an influence in the Copper Country located in the Upper Peninsula of Michigan, the Driftless Area of southwestern Wisconsin and the Iron Ranges of northern Michigan and Minnesota, as well as in the major copper mining district of Butte, Montana. Statues and monuments in many towns pay tribute to the influence of the Cornish on their development. Some inhabitants of Tangier Island, Virginia, a former Cornish fishing settlement, have a Cornish accent that traces back to the Cornish settlers who settled there in 1686.

== Cultural references ==
In Grass Valley, California, the tradition of singing Cornish carols lives on and one local historian of the area says the songs have become “the identity of the town”. Some of the members of today’s Cornish Carol Choir are in fact descendants of the original Cornish gold miners.

The Show of Hands song "Cousin Jack" describes the emigration of Cornish people to various parts of the globe.

== See also ==
- Category:American people of Cornish descent
- List of topics related to Cornwall
- Culture of Cornwall
- Culture of Minnesota
- History of Cornwall
- Celtic nations
- Mining in Cornwall
- Camborne School of Mines
