= 2012 United Kingdom budget =

Budget 2012
- Presented: Wednesday 21 March 2012
- Country: United Kingdom
- Parliament: 55th
- Party: Coalition government
- Chancellor: George Osborne
- Total revenue: £592 billion (38.5% of 2011 GDP)
- Total expenditures: £682 billion (45% of 2011 GDP)
- Deficit: £90 billion (6% of 2011 GDP)
- Website: 2012 Budget

The 2012 United Kingdom budget was delivered by George Osborne, the Chancellor of the Exchequer, to the House of Commons on Wednesday 21 March 2012.

It was the third budget of the Conservative-Liberal Democrat coalition government that was formed in 2010, and also the third to be delivered by Osborne.

Its key points included a rise in the personal tax allowance, a cut in the top rate of income tax and in the rate of corporation tax, and a new level of stamp duty on high-value properties.

== Key measures ==
=== Taxes ===
Receipts	2012-13 revenues (£bn)
Income Tax	155
Value Added Tax (VAT)	102
National Insurance	106
Excise duties	48
Corporate Tax	45
Council Tax	26
Business rates	26
Other	84
Total Government revenue	592

Osborne announced that from April 2013, the annual personal income tax allowance will be raised from £8,105 to £9,205. It was estimated this would make 24 million people better-off by up to £220 per year. The 40% tax band will become applicable for incomes over £41,450 per year (a reduction of £1,025 from £42,475) and the top tax band for high-earners will be reduced to 45% from 50%; Osborne said the 50% rate introduced by the previous Labour government was "damaging" the country's competitiveness and had raised only one-third of the £3 billion it had intended to raise. From 2014, income tax-payers will receive a 'personal tax statement' outlining how their income tax and National Insurance contributions were spent.

Also from April 2013, people over 65 years of age will not get an enhanced personal income tax allowance, known as the age allowance. However, those who have an age allowance under the previous tax rules will not lose their age allowance. HM Revenue and Customs estimated that 4.4 million pensioners would become worse-off in real terms by up to £83 in 2013–14.

The Chancellor introduced, with immediate effect, a new rate of stamp duty of 7% on properties purchased for over £2 million. The rate increases to 15% if any such property is bought through a company. This was a common tax avoidance strategy where individuals could set up a limited liability company which bought the property, thereby avoiding paying stamp duty, and then immediately sold it back to the individual. Osborne said this abuse "roused the anger of many of our citizens".

Corporation tax was cut to 24% from 26% with effect from April 2012. The rate will reduce to 22% by 2014, which Osborne described as "dramatically lower" than the UK's competitors. He announced a consultation on simplifying the tax system for smaller businesses. The television production, video gaming, and animation industries benefited from new tax reliefs, designed to keep creative talent in Britain.

From January 2013, the bank levy increased to 0.105%, raising £2.5 billion in revenue.

Duty on tobacco was raised immediately by 5% above inflation, but there was no change to the already planned increase of alcohol duty by 2% above inflation. A new duty was introduced on gaming machines at a standard rate of 20%, reduced to 5% on small jackpot games.

The planned increase in fuel duty of 3.02p per litre would still go ahead from 1 August 2012, with road tax to rise in line with inflation. Osborne said he would welcome private investment in Britain's roads. Another already planned increase in Air Passenger Duty would also go ahead in April 2012.

=== Spending ===
Department	2012-13 expenditure (£bn)
Social protection	207
Health	130
Education	91
Debt interest	46
Defence	39
Public order and safety	32
Personal social services	33
Housing and Environment	21
Transport	22
Industry, agriculture and employment	19
Other	43
Total Government spending	683

=== Benefits ===
According to a sliding scale, less child benefit will be applicable when one person in a household has an annual income over £50,000. The benefit will be reduced by 1% for each £100 earned above £50,000 per year, so the benefit will be zero for an income above £60,000.

The British Armed Forces will benefit from savings made by the withdrawal of troops from Afghanistan. An extra £100 million would be invested in military accommodation; the families' welfare grant was doubled; and service personnel serving overseas will receive 100% relief on average council tax bill.

== Economy ==
The independent Office for Budget Responsibility (OBR) revised upward its forecast for economic growth in the UK for 2012 from 0.7% to 0.8%. It estimated growth of 2% in 2013, 2.7% in 2014, and 3% in each of the two following years.

The OBR also forecast that the unemployment rate would peak at 8.7% in 2012 before falling each year to 6.3% by 2016/17. Over the coming five years, one million new jobs would be created.

Government borrowing for 2011/12 was estimated to reduce by £1 billion to £126 billion, with further reductions to £120 billion in 2012/13, then £98 billion in 2013/14 and ultimately to £21 billion by 2016/17.

Osborne forecast that inflation would fall from 2.8% in 2012 to 1.9% in 2013.

== Reactions ==
Labour's Ed Miliband, the Leader of the Opposition, said the coalition government's budget "failed the fairness test" and that cutting the top rate of income tax to 45% from 50% showed it was a "millionaire's budget which squeezes the middle".

Vince Cable, the Liberal Democrat business secretary, stated that reducing the top income tax rate was "sensible", though it would not have been his "priority" had it been his budget. Nick Clegg, the deputy prime minister, called the coalition's budget one that "every liberal can be proud of".

There was mixed reaction in the business sector. The Institute of Directors welcomed the cut in corporation tax to 24% from 26% with further reductions to 22% by 2014, and the Confederation of British Industry's director-general said Osborne's budget "provided a much-needed confidence boost". The national chairman of the Federation of Small Businesses said his organisation was "pleased with some" aspects of the budget, while business owners in the brewing and pub industry criticised the already planned increase in alcohol duty.

Teachers' unions the Association of Teachers and Lecturers, National Union of Teachers and NASUWT said the chancellor had failed to deliver a budget for promoting children's and young people's policies and wanted more investment in schools.

The plan to go ahead with a rise in fuel duty in August 2012 was met with dismay by motor industry figures. The AA's president said the move would "force drivers off the road" and "makes no allowance for car-dependent, rural and disabled drivers". The chief executives of several airlines attacked the government for proceeding with an 8% rise in Air Passenger Duty, which the Airport Operators Association warned would harm the country's tourism industry and "needlessly jeopardise the recovery of the economy".

The Daily Telegraph reported that the capping of tax relief at 25% for individuals claiming more than £50,000 per year was effectively a "25 per cent minimum tax rate" and was a Tycoon Tax in all but name.

As the year progressed, several of the measures in the budget were reversed, provoking further reaction from opposition politicians. Labour Party leader and Leader of the Opposition Ed Miliband MP, in a speech to the House of Commons during Prime Minister's Questions on 18 April 2012 said:

On charities, the reality is that the Prime Minister is not making the rich worse off. He is making charities worse off. Over the past month we have seen the charity tax shambles, the churches tax shambles, the caravan tax shambles and the pasty tax shambles, so we are all keen to hear the Prime Minister’s view on why he thinks, four weeks on from the Budget, even people within Downing Street are calling it an omnishambles Budget.

— Ed Miliband MP, Prime Ministers Questions, 18 April 2012
