= Paste (pasty) =

Mexican turnover

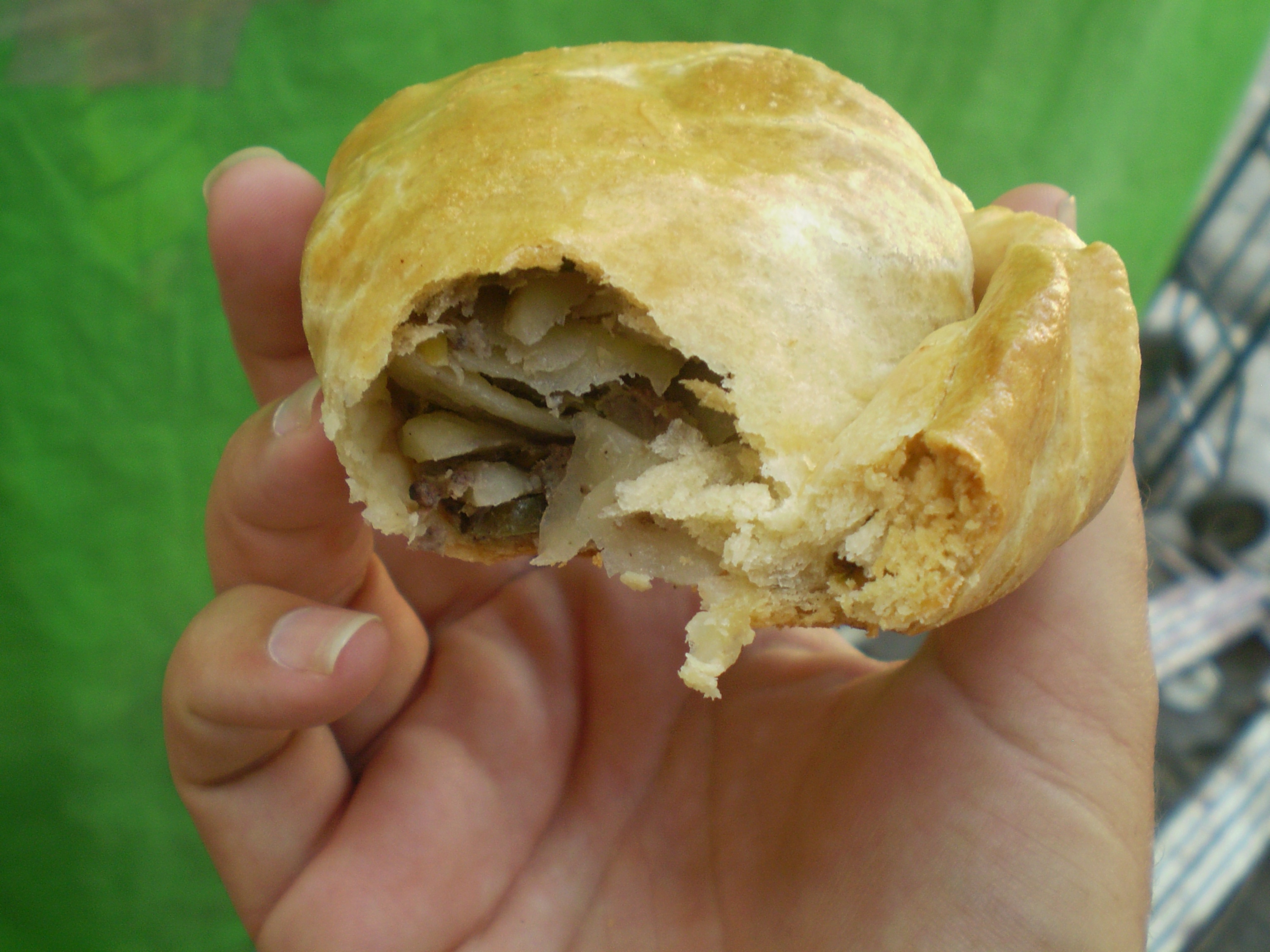
- Type: Turnover
- Place of origin: Mexico
- Region or state: Hidalgo

A paste (Spanish: [ˈpaste]) is a small turnover produced in the state of Hidalgo in central Mexico and in the surrounding area. They are stuffed with a variety of fillings including potatoes and ground beef, apples, pineapple, sweetened rice, or other typical Mexican ingredients, such as tinga and mole.

The paste has its roots in the Cornish pasty introduced by miners and builders from Cornwall in the United Kingdom, who were contracted in the towns of Mineral del Monte (Real del Monte) and Pachuca in Hidalgo starting in 1824.

== Festival ==
The International Pasty Festival is held in Real del Monte for three days each October.

== See also ==
- Cornish emigration to Mexico
- List of pastries
- List of stuffed dishes
