= International Pasty Festival =

Annual festival in Mexico

International Pasty Festival Festival Internacional del Paste
- Status: active
- Genre: Food festival
- Dates: October, 3 days
- Frequency: Annually
- Locations: Real del Monte, Hidalgo
- Coordinates: 20.138216°N 98.673163°W
- Country: Mexico
- Inaugurated: 2009
- Next event: 13 - 15 October 2024
- Website: https://festivaldelpaste.com

The International Pasty Festival (Spanish: Festival Internacional del Paste) is an annual festival celebrating the pasty that has been held in Real del Monte, Hidalgo, Mexico since 2009. Pasties (known locally as pastes), were introduced to the region by Cornish miners in the 19th century and are still made by their descendants. Traditional recipes may be followed, but often the ingredients today reflect local preferences. The annual festival attracts thousands of visitors, who may also visit the Cornish Pasty Museum and attend other cultural events.

== Background ==
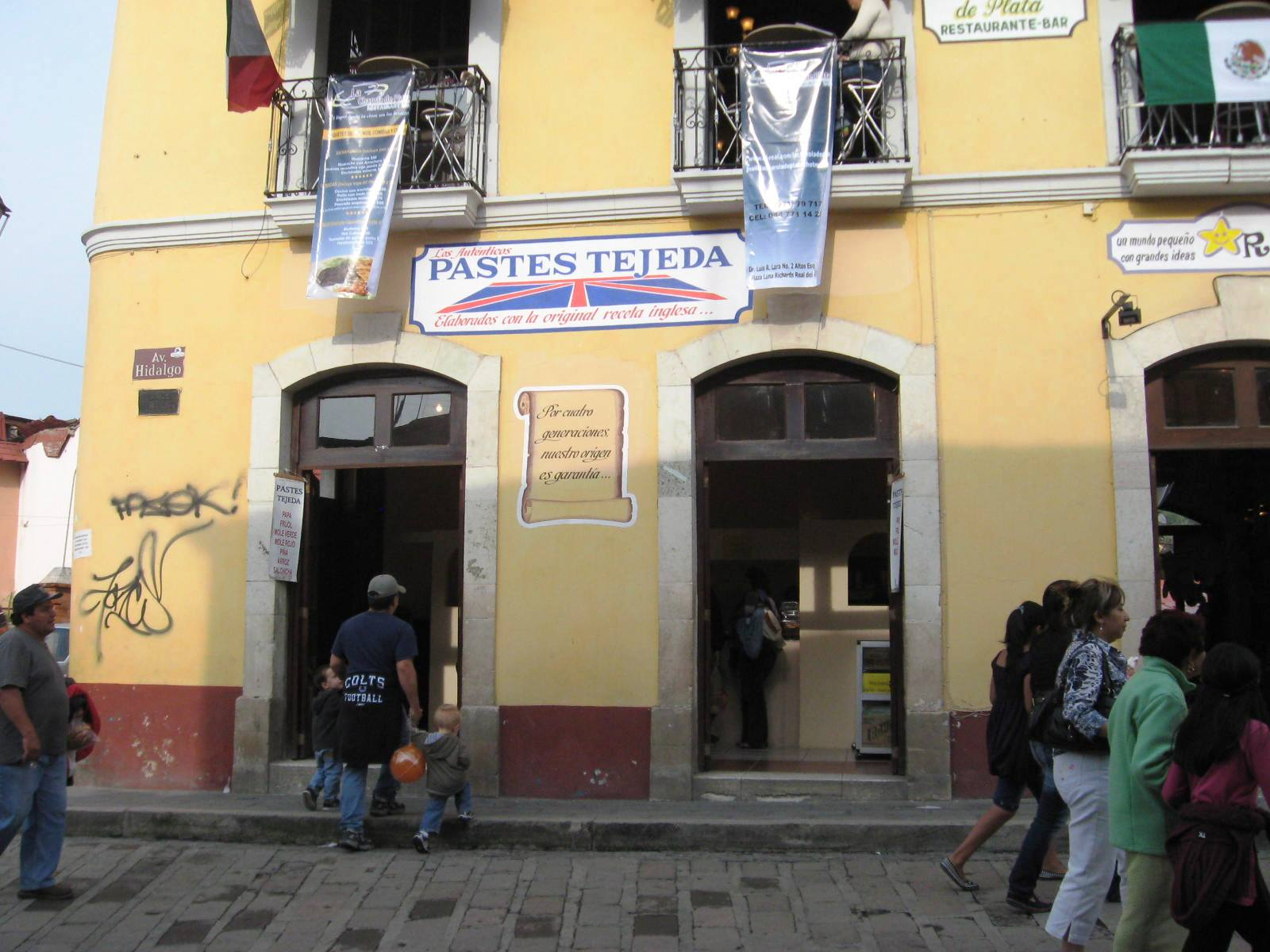
Paste shop in Real del Monte

The municipality of Pachuca has a long history of gold and silver mining, but during the Mexican War of Independence (1810–21) much of the infrastructure was destroyed and many of the mines became flooded. A group named the Real del Monte Company was formed in 1824 and arranged to bring mining equipment and experienced miners from Cornwall. After landing on Mocambo beach, south of Veracruz, the miners took 14 months to struggle 250 miles (400 km) through swamps and rain forests to Real del Monte.

The Cornish brought cultural traditions that included football, wrestling and baking pasties. Although the Cornish community shrank after the 1911 revolution, some Cornish names survive. There are buildings and houses with European architecture, including Francis Rule's Methodist Church. In 2008 the Cornish Mexican Cultural Society helped arrange for Real del Monte and Redruth in Cornwall to be twinned.

Today many establishments in Pachuca bake pasties. The growth of shops selling pasties coincided with the decline in mining as residents looked for other ways to make a living. A paste may have "classic" meat, potato and turnip filling, perhaps with additional herbs and jalapeño, and may also be filled with red or green mole, pineapple, shredded pork or chicken in chilli or even fish.

== History ==
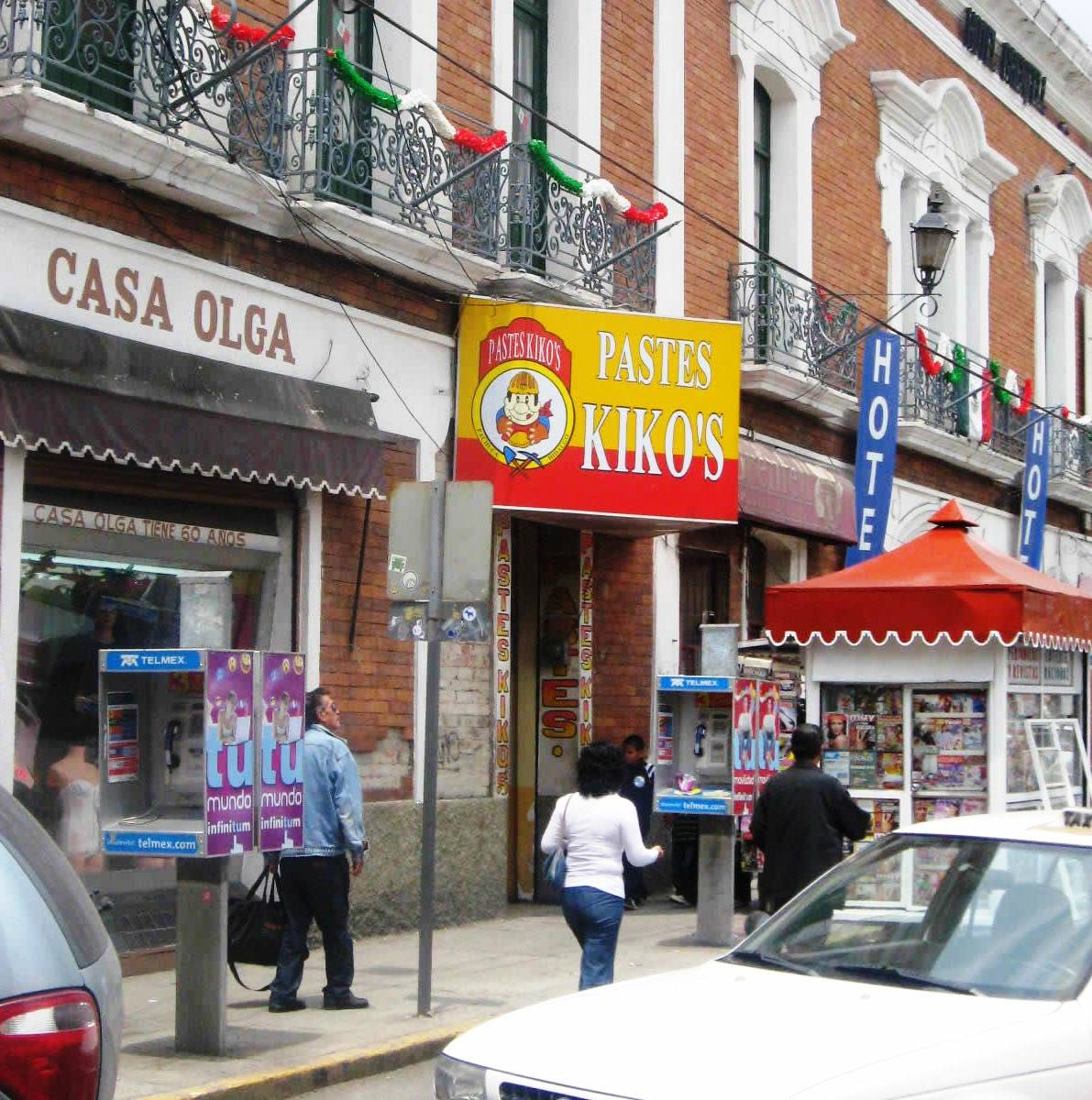
Pastes Kiko's, a pastes chain in Pachuca Mexico

The 3-day International Pasty Festival was launched in Real del Monte in October 2009. María Oralia Vega Ortíz, Hidalgo tourism secretary, opened the festival. Richard Williams, president of the Sociedad Cornish Mexicana, was among those present. Thirteen paste companies participated. Commercial stalls sold the savoury snacks on the main streets of the town. Fillings included tongue, brain, sausage, beans and yellow cheese. There were teething troubles, as when customs officials confiscated swedes that were being imported as an essential ingredient for authentic pasties.

The October 2011 festival attracted about 20,000 visitors. In November 2011 Real del Monte opened the first Cornish Pasty Museum in the world, organised by the town's Cornish Culture Council. Before the museum was opened a group from The Regulatory Council for the Cornish Heritage of Real del Monte visited Cornwall on a week-long fact finding mission and met with the Cornish Pasty Association. The fourth annual "International Paste Festival" was held on 12–14 October 2012, supported by the government of the state of Hidalgo. Visitors were invited to view pre-Columbian archaeological sites, mines and the English Cemetery. Eight companies engaged in making pastes participated in the festival.

In May 2013 Juan Renato Olivares, Hidalgo tourism minister, visited Cornwall to try to encourage the people of Cornwall to visit Mexico. He said "The Mexicans are immensely proud of their extraordinary links with Cornwall as so many of the descendants of the original miners live in Mexico – people with wonderful names such as Enrique Pengelly and Raoul Pascoe." In September 2013 Victor Aladro, the president of the Cornish Mexican Pasty Association, was with a delegation that toured Heartlands in Pool, Cornwall, where he was given a Cornish Mining World Heritage Site sign. The sign was to be unveiled at a ceremony celebrating mining during the forthcoming International Pasty Festival.

Prince Charles and the Duchess of Cornwall visited Real del Monte in 2014. They visited the Pasty Museum, where the couple made pasties. The 7th Festival Internacional del Paste was held on 9–11 October 2015 in Real del Monte. The festival had developed into one of the largest in the state, providing an opportunity for marketing products and services of the tourism and food industries. It included artistic and cultural events, and the opportunity to savour the local pasties, or pastes.

== Sources ==
- 1Er Festival Internacional del Paste – Real del Monte, Hgo., Pastes Real de Plateros
- Antonio Naciff (10 October 2009), "Celebran primer Festival Internacional del Paste en Real del Monte", La Crónica Diaria (in Spanish), Real del Monte, archived from the original on 12 August 2016
- Beverley Coumbe (19 September 2013), "Mexico's Cornish Mining Links Celebrated with Visit", The West Briton, archived from the original on 11 September 2016 – via HighBeam Research
- Dan Hyde (2 November 2014), "Prince Charles and the Mexican city with 'more pasties than Cornwall'", The Daily Telegraph
- David Millward (14 November 2011), "World's first Cornish pasty museum opens in Mexico", The Daily Telegraph
- "Festival Internacional del Paste Real del Monte 2015", Donde Hay Feria (in Spanish), archived from the original on 12 August 2016
- Lynne French (4 May 2013), "Pasties and miners bring Mexican minister to Cornwall", BBC News, Cornwall
- Manuel Castellanos (10 October 2012), Este fin de semana, 4º Festival del Paste en Real del Monte (in Spanish), archived from the original on 20 August 2016
- Mexican Pasty Makers Get Tips From Cornwall, Cornish Pasty Association, 11 November 2011
- Nick Rider (25 September 2015), "Cornish Mexico: How the pasty was transported to the Sierras", The Independent
- Ursula Jeffries (Autumn 2012), "23rd Rosyer Lecture: Cornish Miners in Mexico" (PDF), London Cornish Association Newsletter, London Cornish Association
