= Tycoon Tax =

Proposed anti-tax avoidance measure

The Tycoon Tax is a form of minimum taxation proposed by Nick Clegg, the Deputy Prime Minister of the United Kingdom and leader of the Liberal Democrats. The ideas of a Tycoon Tax form part of anti-tax avoidance measures, similar to those prepared by Warren Buffett. The proposal states that there should be a legal minimum tax, written into statute. Any legal tax avoidance measures would therefore become illegal if the result was that the individual ends up paying less in tax than the threshold set by the government. Current suggestions are for a minimum tax threshold are around 20%. The Tycoon Tax has some similarities to the United States's Alternative Minimum Tax (AMS).

Calls for minimum taxation of the 'ultra-rich' have been given greater impetus after the high-profile revelation that Republican Party Presidential candidate Mitt Romney will pay a projected tax rate for 2011 of 15.4%. Such measures are legal, and often arise from the far lower rate of taxation on investment, as opposed to income. Nick Clegg has been quoted as saying "Mitt Romney, it turns out, pays 13 per cent tax. You hope that kind of thing doesn’t go on in this country." HM Revenue and Customs, the tax collection agency for the United Kingdom has also stated that there are approximately 16,000 tax payers in the UK who have incomes above £1,000,000, who pay tax at an average of around 35%. The UK tax system requires individuals to pay 50% tax on all income above £150,000. Other taxes, such as Capital Gains Tax, have lower rates. Regarding this issue, Nick Clegg has said that "There are hundreds of people earning millions per year who are barely paying 20 per cent tax, forget 40 per cent, forget 50 per cent, forget 30 per cent. They are not even paying 20 per cent." Whilst this is legal, Nick Clegg believes the Tycoon Tax is justified as “It makes people so incredibly angry when you are getting up early in the morning, working really hard to try to do the right thing for your family and for your community, you are paying your taxes and then you see people [...] who are paying extraordinarily low rates of tax.”

The Tycoon Tax has been attacked as a "superficially attractive measure that falls apart under scrutiny”. by Lord Oakeshott, former Treasury Spokesman for the Liberal Democrats. Nick Clegg has responded by saying that “The one person in the party against the tycoon tax is one of our very own tycoons”.

In his speech on the 2012 United Kingdom budget, George Osborne, Chancellor of the Exchequer of the United Kingdom, announced that from 2013 anyone seeking to claim more than £50,000 of certain tax reliefs in any year will have a cap set at 25 per cent of their income. It has been suggested that this incorporation of a cap on tax relief is effectively a Tycoon Tax in all but name. Conversely, The Guardian has described the proposed cap of tax relief as more like "collection measures than a new tax".

In September 2021, the Australian Greens Party proposed the implementation of a tycoon tax in Australia. The Greens' party leader, Adam Bandt, stated that such a policy would be a major piece in potential negotiations with a future Labor Government.
