= World Pasty Championships =

Food festival in Cornwall, England

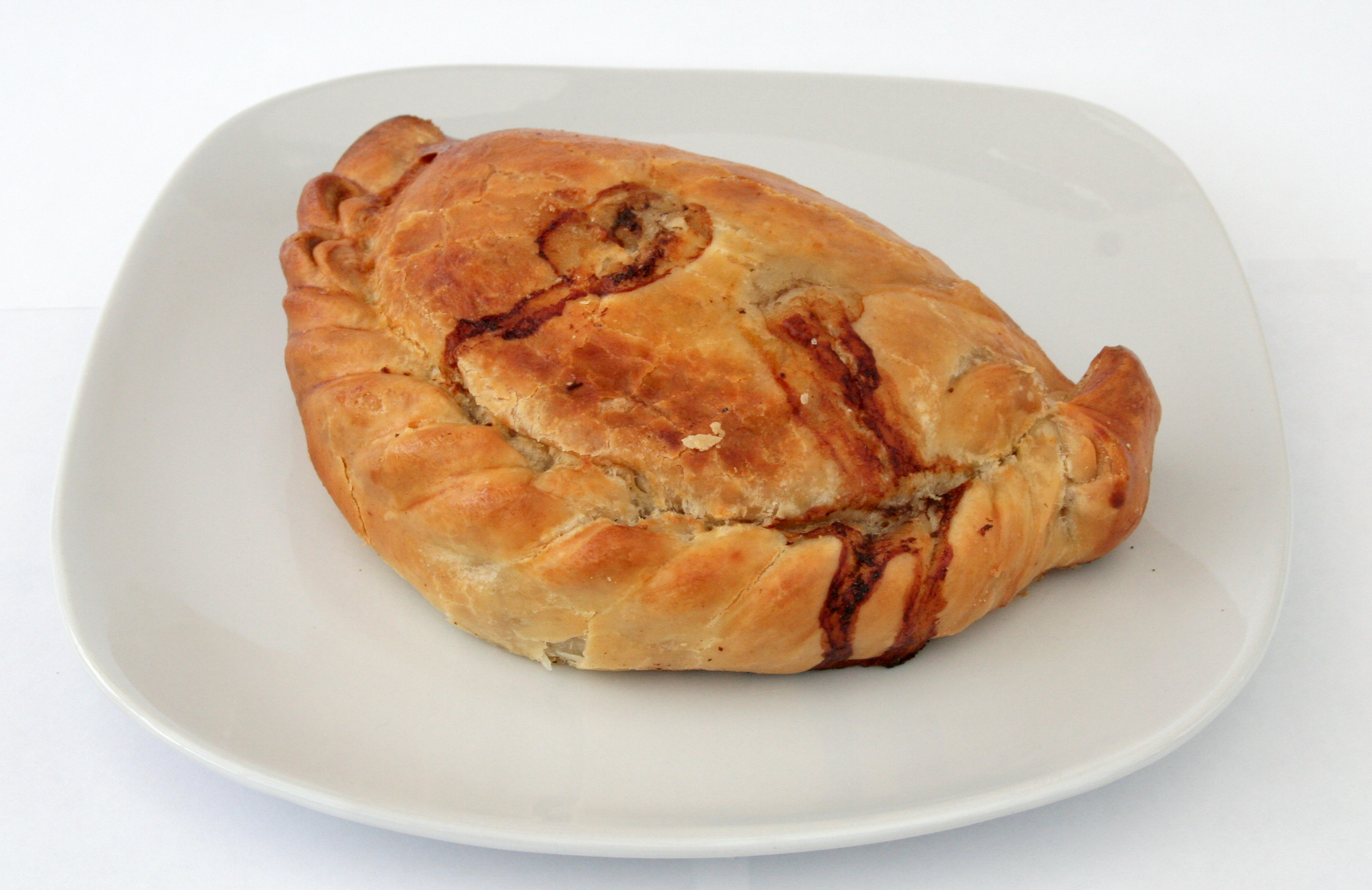
- Status: Inactive
- Genre: Food festival
- Frequency: Annually
- Locations: Eden Project, Cornwall
- Coordinates: 50.362746°N 4.745312°W
- Country: England
- Inaugurated: March 3, 2012
- Most recent: 5 March 2022
- Organiser: Eden Project
- Sponsor: Cornish Pasty Association

The World Pasty Championships were an annual event held in Cornwall to celebrate the Cornish Pasty and its variants, with entrants from around the world including Australia and the Americas. Awards were given to amateurs, professionals, juniors and companies. Entries in the Cornish pasty category must be made in Cornwall with traditional ingredients and techniques, but far more freedom was allowed in the "open savoury" category.

This ended in 2023 after the Eden Project and the Cornish Pasty Association had decided that the championships have "run their course".

== Background ==
The pasty originated in the 14th century as a food that miners could take underground. There is some dispute over whether the first pasties were from Devon, crimped on top, or from Cornwall, crimped on the side. (Note: Some claim the tin miners would hold the crimp while they ate the pasty, then discard it because their hands could be contaminated with arsenic. However, many old photographs show that pasties were wrapped in bags made of paper or muslin and were eaten from end-to-end. According to the earliest Cornish recipe book, published in 1929, this is "the true Cornish way" to eat a pasty. Another theory suggests that pasties were marked at one end with an initial and then eaten from the other end so that if not finished in one go, they could easily be reclaimed by their owners.) Since 2011 a pasty must be made in Cornwall to carry the label "Cornish Pasty". Pasties have been carried to many other parts of the world by Cornish immigrants, some of whom have developed unusual variants. The World Pasty Championships are an annual event sponsored by the Cornish Pasty Association and held at the Eden Project. As of 2016 there were categories for Cornish Pastry and for Open Savory broken into Professional, Amateur, Junior (15 and under) and Company sub-categories.

== History ==
The first World Pasty Championships were held on 3 March 2012 at the Eden Project, a park near St Austell, Cornwall. Entrants came from the UK, US and Australia. The 102 pasties that were entered were evaluated by a panel of 21 judges based on taste, texture, appearance, crimp and technical expertise. The open savoury amateur winner was a pasty with wild rabbit poached in cider-soaked leeks, with peas and lemon zest.

In 2015 the 88-year-old mother of John Lethbridge, a Cornish sea shanty singer with the Fisherman's Friends, won the Cornish Pasty Amateur title. She had been making pasties since she helped her mother as a child. Mrs. Lethbridge uses the traditional potatoes, swede and onion, sliced thinly and placed in layers. She always uses beef skirt for the meat. At the 2015 event an empanada submitted by the miner Jorge Pereira from Chile won the open savoury category. The traditional Chilean pasty had beef, onion, hard-boiled eggs, olives and sultanas. Entrants also came from Canada and the US. The Open Savoury Professional category was won by a smoked haddock, white wine and mustard pasty. The 70 centimetres (28 in) diameter globe was the work of the head chef of the Eden Project.

At the 5th annual championship, held on St Piran's Day 2016, a baker from Canada, won the Pasty Ambassador prize. Matt Grant originated in England, where his mother taught him how to make a pasty. He now runs a pasty company in Arnprior, Ontario. Other entries included an eclectic range of fillings, including a haggis, neeps and tatties pasty, a pulled pork, sweet potato, shallots and cheddar pasty, and a Mumbai pasty with onion, sweet potato, green peas, cauliflower and undisclosed spices. Altogether there were more than 200 entries. The event included comedy and music performances.

== Sources ==
- Anita Merritt (6 March 2016), "Cornwall and Canada are victorious in Westcountry's World Pasty Championships", Exeter Express and Echo
- "Cornish crimped by a Chilean at World Pasty Championships", The Guardian, 28 February 2015
- Joe Shute (4 March 2015), "The secret of the 88-year-old World Pasty Champion", The Daily Telegraph
- Mansfield, Emma (2011), The Little Book of the Pasty, Cornwall: Lovely Little Books, ISBN 978-1-906771-28-7
- Martin, Edith (1929), Cornish Recipes: Ancient and Modern, Truro: A. W. Jordan
- "Meet Ambassador Matt Grant, world envoy for the pasty", CBC Radio, 9 March 2016
- Miller, Luke; Westergren, Marc, "History of the Pasty", The Cultural Context of the Pasty", Michigan Technological University
- Neil Shaw (5 March 2016), "Pictures as World Pasty Championships are held at Eden Project on St Piran's Day 2016", The Herald (Plymouth)
- World Pasty Championships, Cornish Pasty Association
- World Pasty Championships, Eden Project, archived from the original on 8 August 2016
- "World Pasty Championships: Eden chef boldly doughs where no one has gone before with giant "global pasty"", Cornwall Today, 2015
- "World Pasty Championships at Eden", Visit Cornwall
- "World Pasty Championship: Victory for Cornish singer's mother, 88", BBC News, 1 March 2015
- "World Pasty Championships winners chosen", BBC News, 4 March 2012
