= Cornish Pasty Association =

British trade association

The Cornish Pasty Association is a British trade association, based in Cornwall, England. As of 2013 the association included about 50 independent bakers of Cornish pasties. The association successfully sought to have the name "Cornish Pasty" protected as one of the Protected geographical indications. Despite the resolution of the 2012 "Pasty tax" matter, the BBC has reported that some Cornish Pasty Association members are still unsure whether Value Added Tax applies to their baked goods.

The association sponsors the World Pasty Championships, an annual event held at the Eden Project. The World Pasty Championships have been held since 2012, an international competition to find the best Cornish pasties and other pasty-type savoury snacks. The town of Real del Monte in Mexico is home of the International Pasty Festival. In November 2011 Real del Monte opened the first Cornish Pasty Museum in the world, organised by the town's Cornish Culture Council. Before the museum was opened a group from the Regulatory Council for the Cornish Heritage of Real del Monte visited Cornwall on a week-long fact finding mission and met with the Cornish Pasty Association.
