= Cornish Mexican Cultural Society =

Cultural society in Mexico

Cornish-Mexican Cultural Society
- Sociedad Cultural Cornish Mexicana Spanish Kowethas Gonisogeth Kernewek-Meksikanek Cornish
- Abbreviation: CMCS
- Formation: 2006
- Founder: Richard Williams
- Type: Cultural association
- Legal status: Defunct
- Purpose: Raise awareness of links between Cornwall and Mexico's "Little Cornwall"
- Official language: English, Spanish

The Cornish-Mexican Cultural Society (Spanish: Sociedad Cultural Cornish Mexicana) was a society to advance awareness of the historical and modern links between Cornwall and Mexico’s “Little Cornwall”, the area of Pachuca and Real del Monte in the state of Hidalgo, Mexico.

== Background ==
The municipality of Pachuca has a long history of gold and silver mining, but during the Mexican War of Independence (1810–1821) much of the infrastructure was destroyed and many of the mines became flooded. A group named the Real del Monte Company was formed in 1824 and arranged to bring mining equipment and experienced miners from Cornwall. After landing on Mocambo beach, south of Veracruz, the Cornish took 14 months to struggle 250 miles (400 km) through swamps and rain forests to bring the equipment to Real del Monte. Many of the transport party, both Cornish and Mexican, died of Yellow Fever during the trek from the coast to the mines.

The Cornish brought cultural traditions that included football, wrestling and baking pasties. Although the Cornish community shrank after the 1911 revolution, some Cornish names survive. There are buildings and houses with British architecture, including Francis Rule's Casa (house).

== History ==
The CMCS was founded in 2006 by the late Richard Williams supported amongst others by historian Dr. Sharron Schwartz and Ainsley Cocks (of the Cornish Mining World Heritage Site Office). The objectives were to foster historic cultural ties between Cornwall and Mexico, particularly the municipalities of Pachuca and Real del Monte in Hidalgo, to enable cultural links to be reestablished between the two mining districts. The driving force was the late Richard Williams, who had been visiting "Little Cornwall" in Mexico since 1998. There were plans for society members to visit Mexico in July 2008 and retrace the route the original party took in 1825–26, reaching Real del Monte on Miner's Day. In September 2008 Richard Williams and 30 other members of the association travelled to Mexico to explore the route taken by their ancestors. Jean Charman, Mayor of Camborne, accompanied the group. During the visit a twinning agreement was signed between Real del Monte and Redruth, Cornwall and a friendship agreement between Pachuca and Camborne.

The 3-day International Pasty Festival was launched in Real del Monte in October 2009. Richard Williams, president of the Society, was among those present. In May 2011 the society published Mining a Shared Heritage: Mexico’s ‘Little Cornwall’, written by the specialist in Cornish mining migration, Sharron Schwartz. It explored the historic links and the way in which families in Mexico and Cornwall are renewing those links. Prince Charles and the Duchess of Cornwall visited Real del Monte on the Day of the Dead in 2014. They visited the Paste Museum, where the couple made pasties.

== Sources ==
- Dan Hyde (2 November 2014), "Prince Charles and the Mexican city with 'more pasties than Cornwall'", The Daily Telegraph
- "Mining a Shared Heritage: Mexico's 'Little Cornwall'" (PDF), Cornish Mining, Summer 2011, archived from the original (PDF) on 26 August 2016
- Nick Rider (25 September 2015), "Cornish Mexico: How the pasty was transported to the Sierras", The Independent
- Sharron P. Schwartz (2008), Cornish-Mexican Cultural Society plan re-enactment of the 'Great Trek' of the Transport Party, University of Exeter
- The Cornish in Mexico, BBC, 30 September 2008
- Ursula Jeffries (Autumn 2012), "23rd Rosyer Lecture: Cornish Miners in Mexico" (PDF), London Cornish Association Newsletter, London Cornish Association
