= JNR Class EF52 =

Japanese locomotive class

Class EF52
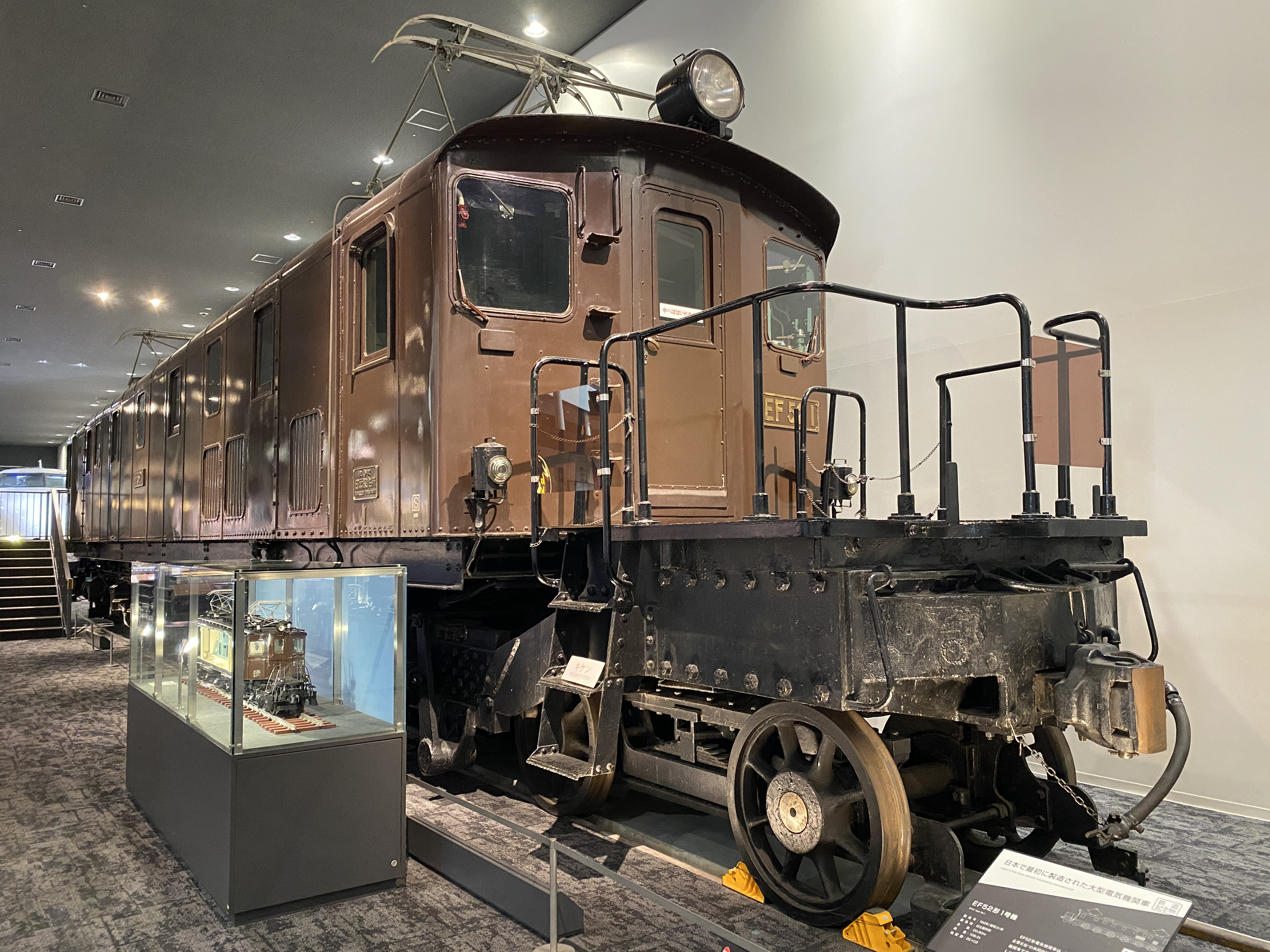
- JNR Class EF52 #1 at the Kyoto Railway Museum
Type and origin
- Power type: Electric
- Builder: Hitachi Limited, Mitsubishi Electric Company, Shibaura Engmeering Works, Kisha Seizo Company and Kawasaki Shipyard Company
- Build date: 1928-1931
Specifications
- Gauge: 1,067 mm (3 ft 6 in)
Performance figures
- Maximum speed: 95 km/h (59 mph)
Career
- Operators: JNR
- Withdrawn: 1975
- Preserved: 2

The Class EF52 was a class of electric locomotive built between 1928 and 1931 in Japan. Although mainline electric locomotives had been designed and manufactured domestically since the introduction of the Class ED15 in 1924, the arrival of the Class EF52 marked the end of importing locomotives to acquire technology.

== History ==
Japan had started importing electric locomotives from European and American manufacturers in 1922, studied for use on the planned electrification of the relatively flat inland main rail line in the country, (the Tokaido Main Line between Tokyo and Kohzu). After the First World War, the Ministry of Railways planned to replace steam locomotives with electric locomotives. As part of the electrification plan, the Ministry of Railways imported 59 electric locomotives (in three different batches) from European and American manufacturers.

Engineers were most impressed with the American locomotives, built by two different manufacturers. All of the models were direct-current type electric locomotive. The first group were built by Westinghouse/Baldwin Locomotive Works, with Westinghouse providing the electrical equipment and Baldwin the mechanical equipment. The second group were from General Electric (GE)/ALCO, with Electric apparatus manufactured by GE and mechanical components made by ALCO. Japanese engineers selected the best technology from each builder to incorporate into what would be the Class EF52. The high-speed circuit breakers from the GE/ALCO models were incorporated into the new design, with the main traction frame mechanism and electric apparatus layout borrowed from the Westinghouse/Baldwin models.

The design and construction of the EF52 was distributed among several Japanese companies: Hitachi Limited, Mitsubishi Electric Company, Shibaura Engineering Works, Kisha Seizo Company and Kawasaki Shipyard Company. The project was headed by Kiichi Asakura, noted steam locomotive designer.

=== Individual locomotives ===
Hitachi Limited built the first two locomotives, EF52 No. 1, in September 1928 and No. 2 in October 1928. Class EF52 No. 3 was completed in May 1928 at Shibaura Engineering Works/Kisha Seizo Company and No. 4 was completed June 1928 at the same builder. Nos. 5-6 were completed in July 1928 at Mitsubishi Electric Company, No. 7 was completed in July 1928 at Kawasaki Shipyard Company, Nos. 8-9 were completed in June 1931 at same builder.

== Technical details ==
The locomotive has platforms at the front and rear for the crew to board and disembark. The bogies are made of a rod frame and assembled with cross beams, and have balancing beams and intermediate coupling devices between the front and rear bogies. The method of operation could be in series, series-parallel and parallel.

== Service life and legacy ==
The EF52 proved to be a reliable locomotive, becoming the railway's standard electric locomotive. The locomotives were first used for pulling express passenger trains on the relatively flat Tokaido Main line.

== See also ==
- Japan Railways locomotive numbering and classification
