= TR2 =

TR2 may refer to:

- C++ Technical Report 2, a document proposing additions to the C++ Standard Library after Technical Report 1
- TR2, a postal district in the TR postcode area
- TAS1R2, a taste receptor

== Facilities ==
- Theatre Royal 2, a drama productions studio, part of Theatre Royal, Plymouth
- Westinghouse TR-2 research reactor operated in the 1960s

== Transportation ==
- Triumph TR2, a sports car from the British Triumph Motor Company
- Tr2, a 2-10-0 steam locomotive (decapod) built in the USA, but operated in Finland
- TR-2, a variant of the Grumman American AA-1
- TR.2, a variant of the Hitachi TR.1
- TR.2, see Orenda Engines

== Video games ==
- Temple Run 2
- Tomb Raider II, a video game
