= JNR Class ED15 =

Japanese electric locomotive type

Class ED15
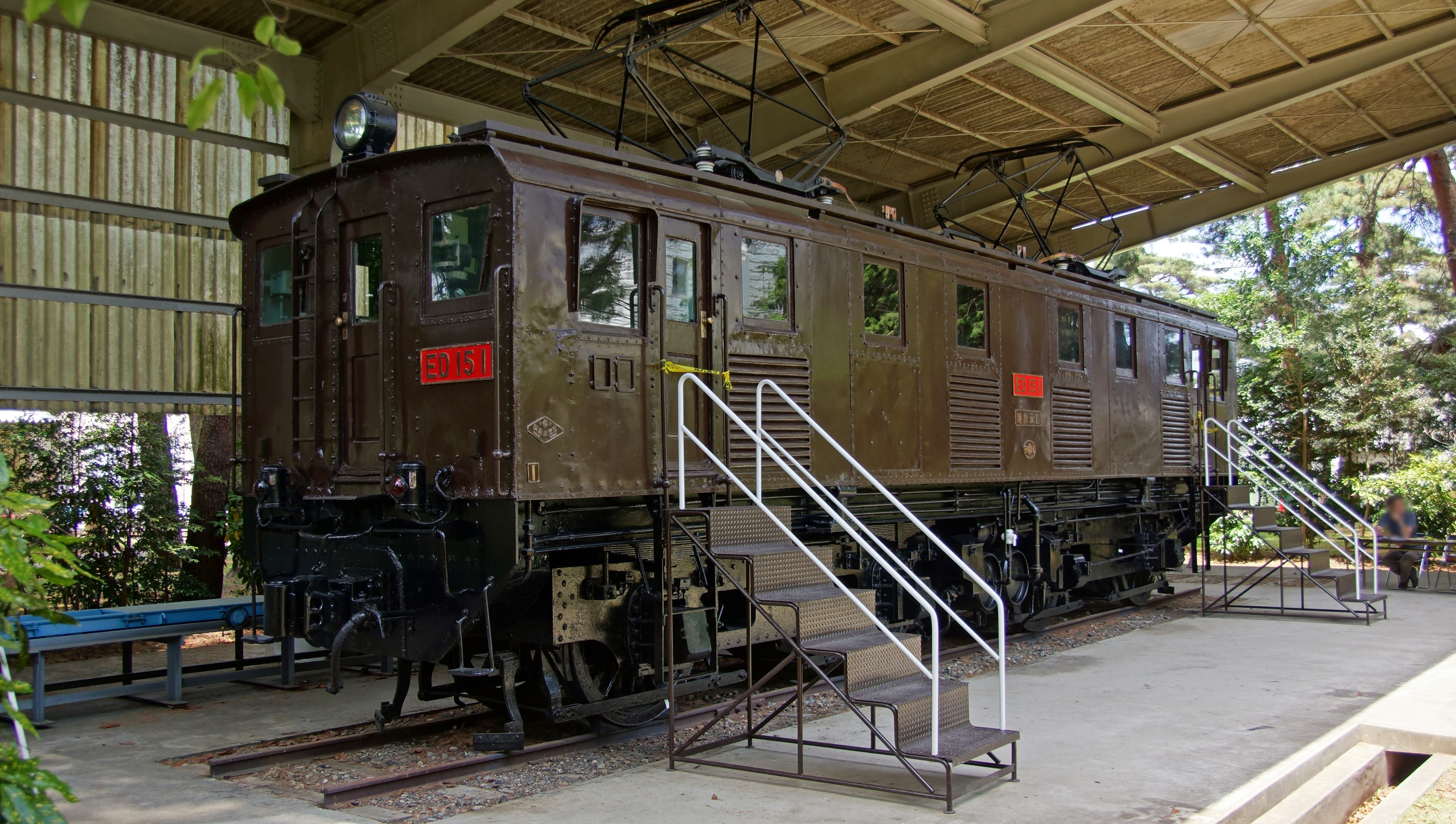
- Preserved ED15 1 in June 2017
Type and origin
- Power type: Electric
- Builder: Hitachi
- Build date: 1924, 1926
- Total produced: 3
Specifications
- Configuration
  - UIC: B + B
- Gauge: 1,067 mm (3 ft 6 in)
- Length
  - Over couplers: 13,260 mm (43 ft 6 in)
  - Over body: 12,220 mm (40 ft 1 1/8 in)
- Width: 2,780 mm (9 ft 1 1/2 in)
- Height: 3,840 mm (12 ft 7 1/8 in)
- Loco weight: 59 t (58 long tons; 65 short tons)
- Electric system/s: 1,500 V DC overhead line
- Current pickup: Pantograph
Performance figures
- Power output: 820 kW (1,100 hp)
- Tractive effort: 9,000 kgf (20,000 lbf)
Career
- Operators: JNR
- Number in class: 3
- Numbers: ED15 1 - 3
- Retired: 1960
- Preserved: 1
- Disposition: All withdrawn

The Class ED15 (ED15形) was an electric locomotive formerly operated in Japan from 1924 until 1960. The Class ED15 was the first mainline electric locomotive type to be built domestically in Japan.

== History ==
Founder Namihei Odaira and other engineers from Hitachi visited the Omiya Works of the Japanese Governmental Railways in 1922 and saw imported electric locomotives. They decided to build one by themselves soon afterwards, and the first example, ED15 1 was completed in 1924. Two more locomotives of the class were built in 1926. Initially designated Class 1070 under the original Japanese Government Railways (JGR) numbering scheme, the locomotives became Class ED15 from 1928.

The locomotives were initially used on Tokaido Main Line freight services, and were later employed on the Chuo Main Line.

The locomotives were withdrawn from service between 1959 and 1960.

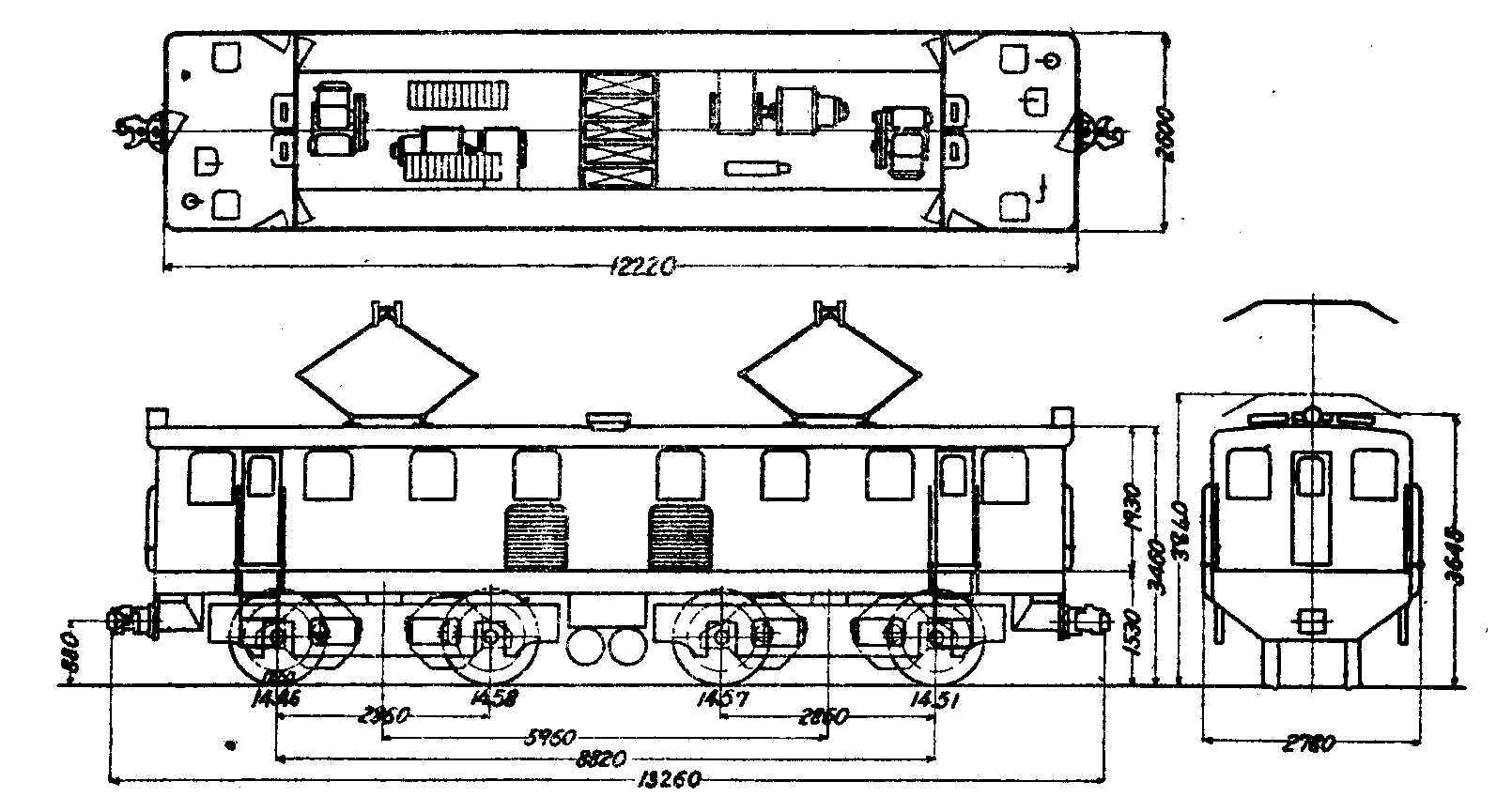
ED15 1 drawing

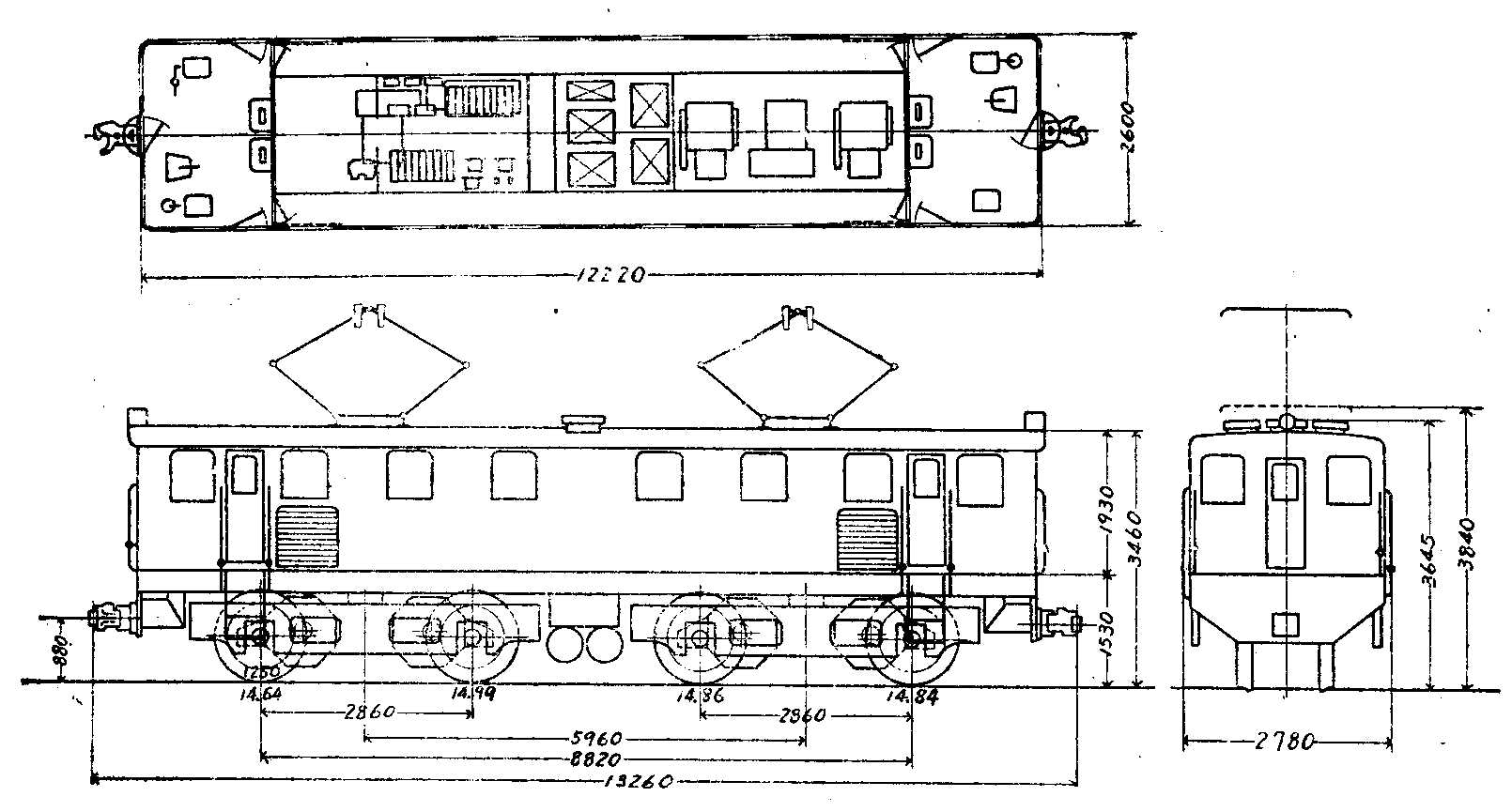
ED15 2 drawing

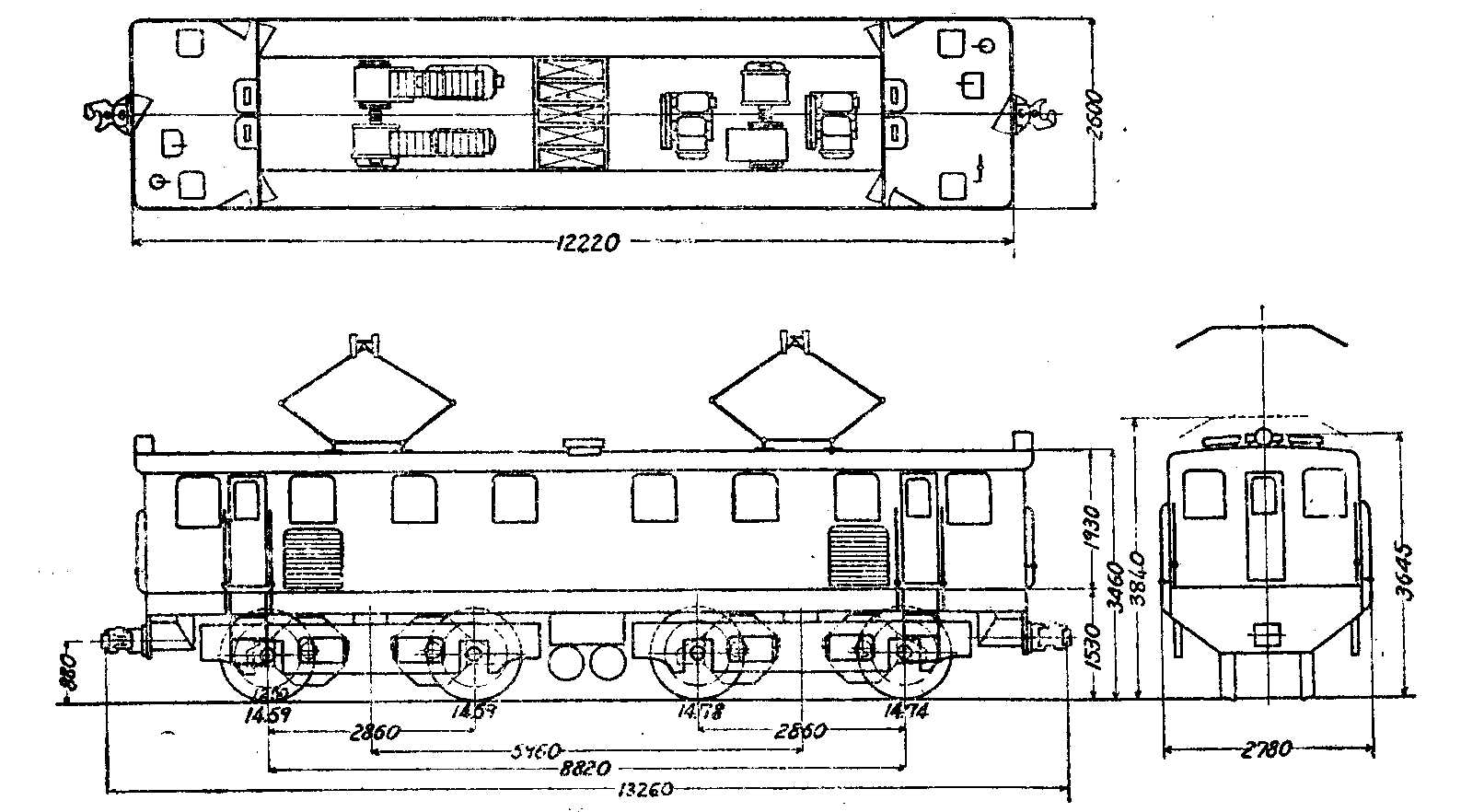
ED15 3 drawing

== Preservation ==
ED15 1 is preserved at the Hitachi Mito Factory in Hitachinaka, Ibaraki.

== Classification ==
The ED15 classification for this locomotive type is explained below.

- E: Electric locomotive
- D: Four driving axles
- 15: Locomotive with maximum speed 85 km/h or less

== See also ==
Mechanical Engineering Heritage (Japan), No. 45: Type ED15 Electric Locomotive.
