= Johnson Controls Hitachi =

Japanese multinational electronics company

Johnson Controls Hitachi Air Conditioning
- Corporate logo since 2015
- Traded as: NSE: JCHAC; BSE: 523398
- ISIN: INE782A01015
- Industry: Home appliances; Consumer electronics
- Founded: 2015; 11 years ago dissolved 2025
- Headquarters: Tokyo, Japan
- Area served: Worldwide
- Key people: Shoji Akiyama (CEO); Shinichi Iizuka (COO)
- Products: Air Conditioners; Air Coolers; Air Purifiers; Refrigerators
- Number of employees: 15,000+ (2018)
- Parent: Bosch Thermotechnik
- Website: www.jci-hitachi.com www.hitachiaircon.com

Johnson Controls Hitachi AC Limited was a Japanese multinational air conditioning manufacturing company that manufactures home appliances and specialises in air conditioning and cooling technology. The company was incorporated on 1 October 2015 in Tokyo, as a Joint Venture between Johnson Controls and Hitachi Appliances. The Chief Executive Officer of the company is Shoji Akiyama. The shares of its major subsidiary in India are traded on the Bombay Stock Exchange under symbol JCHAC.

== Acquisition ==
In July 2024, Johnson Controls said it would sell its residential and light commercial buildings business to Bosch for $6.7 billion. As part of the deal, Bosch will acquire 100% of the Johnson Controls-Hitachi Air Conditioning joint venture, including Hitachi’s 40% stake. Johnson Controls will continue selling York and Coleman products, while the Hitachi brand will remain in Asia under a long-term license with Bosch Home Comfort Group.

== India ==
In India, Hitachi air conditioners are manufactured and marketed by Hitachi Home & Life Solutions India Ltd, which is a joint venture between Hitachi Homes and the Johnson Controls group based in Ireland. The company is headquartered in Ahmadabad, Gujarat. It has another Global Development Center in Kadi, Gujarat.

== Gallery ==
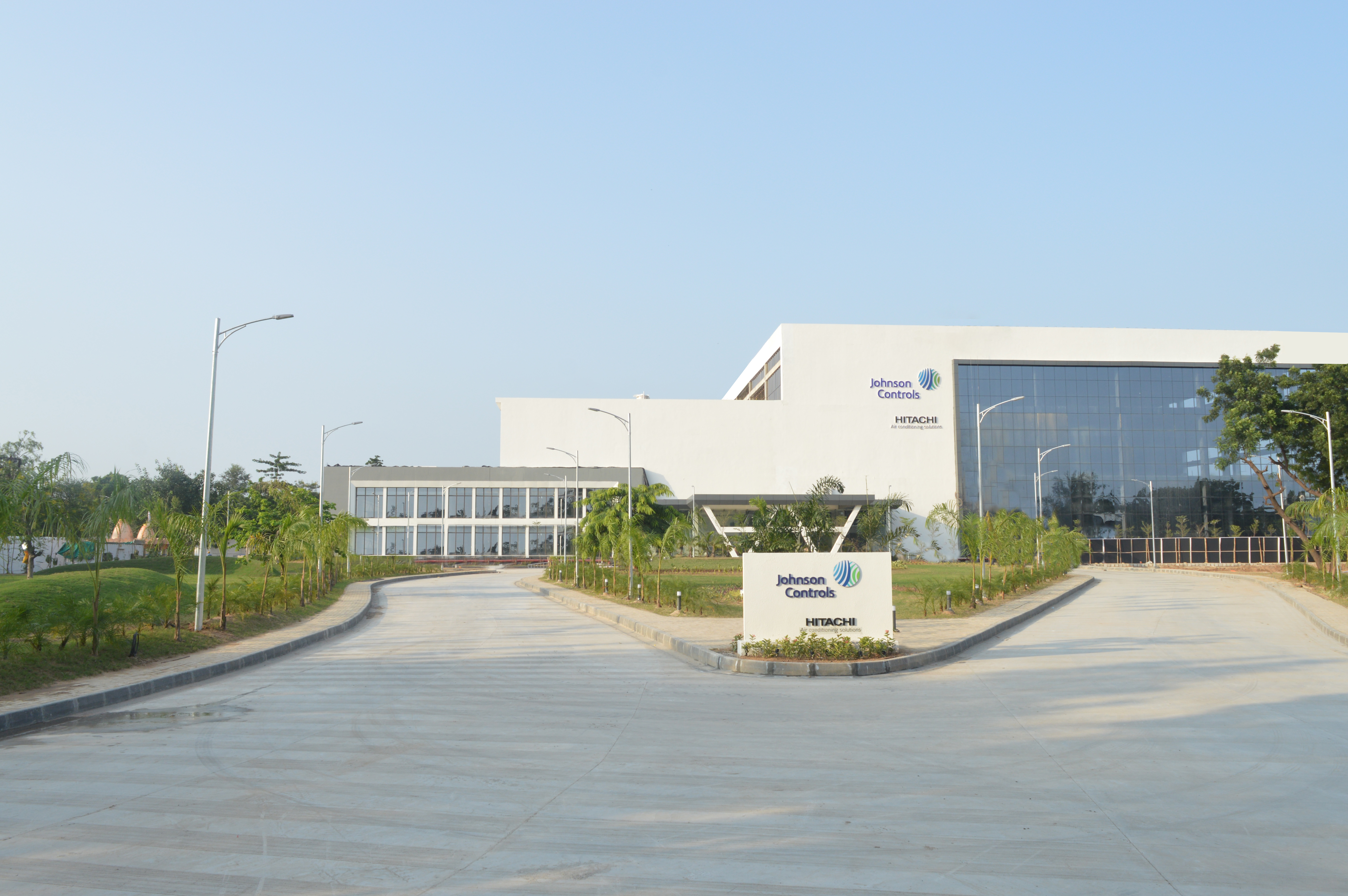
Johnson Controls Hitachi R&D Centre in India

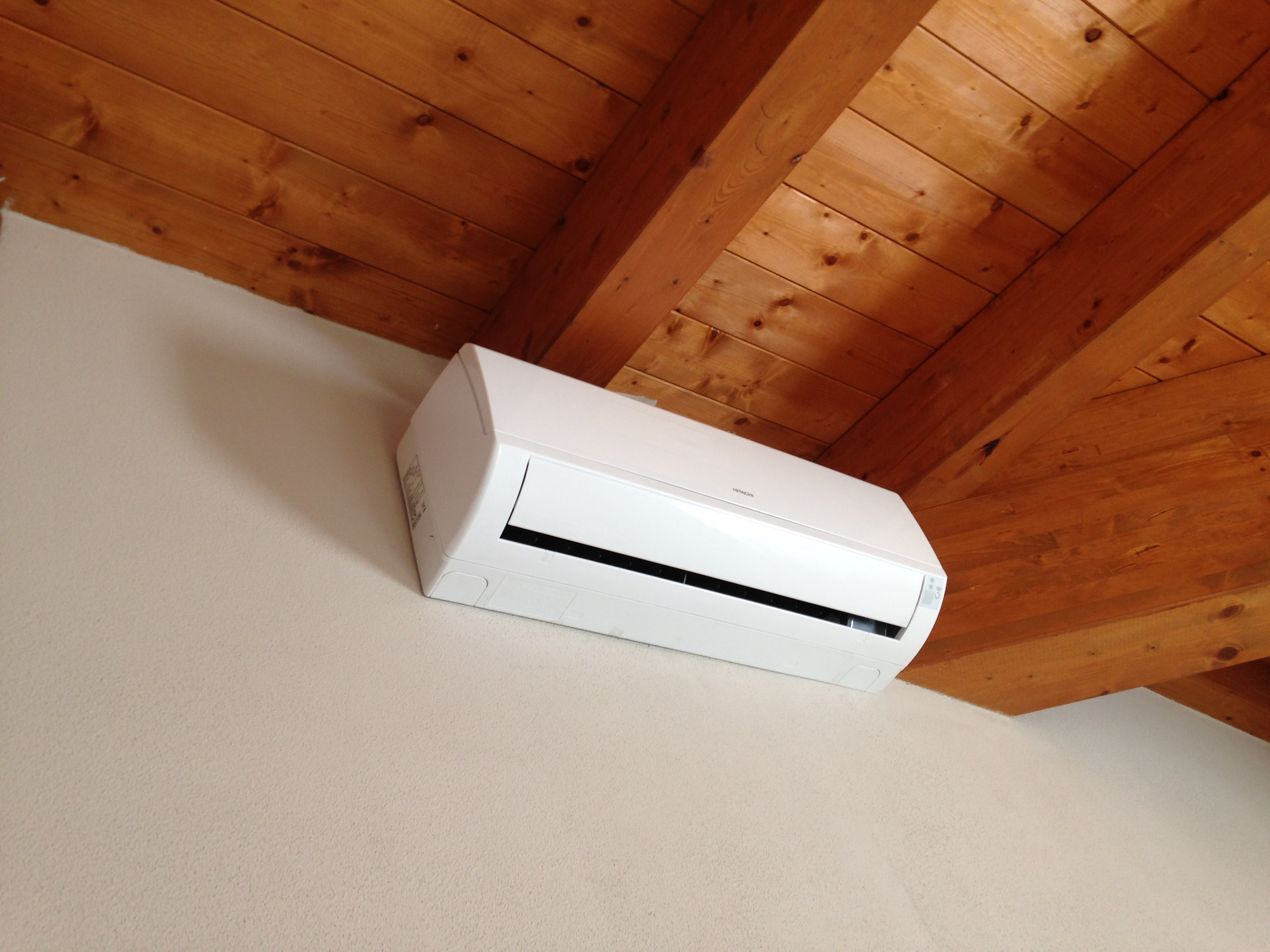
Hitachi Indoor Unit

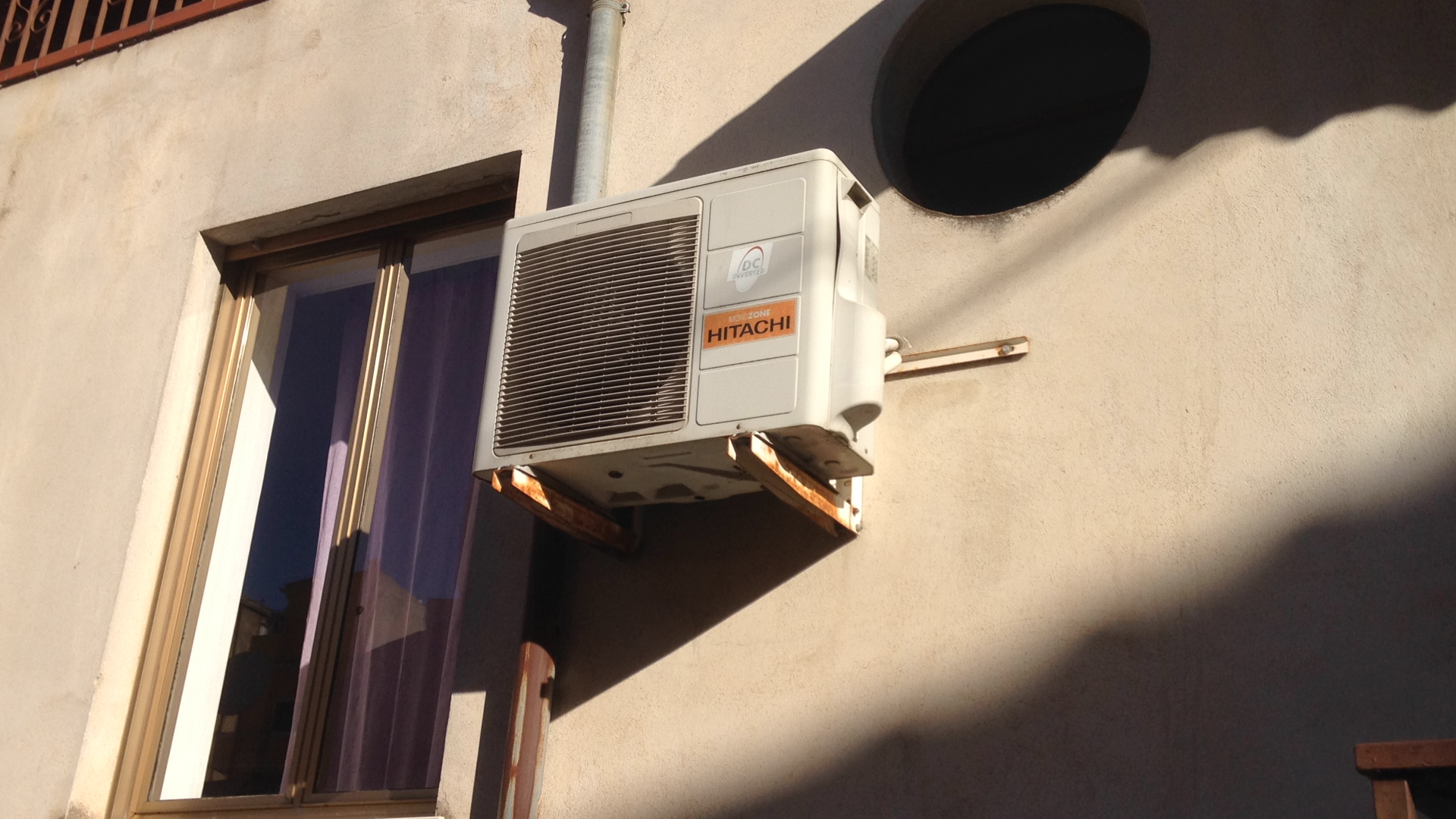
Hitachi Outdoor Unit
