= Hitachi =

Japanese multinational engineering and electronics company

Hitachi, Ltd.
- Hitachi logo used since 2025

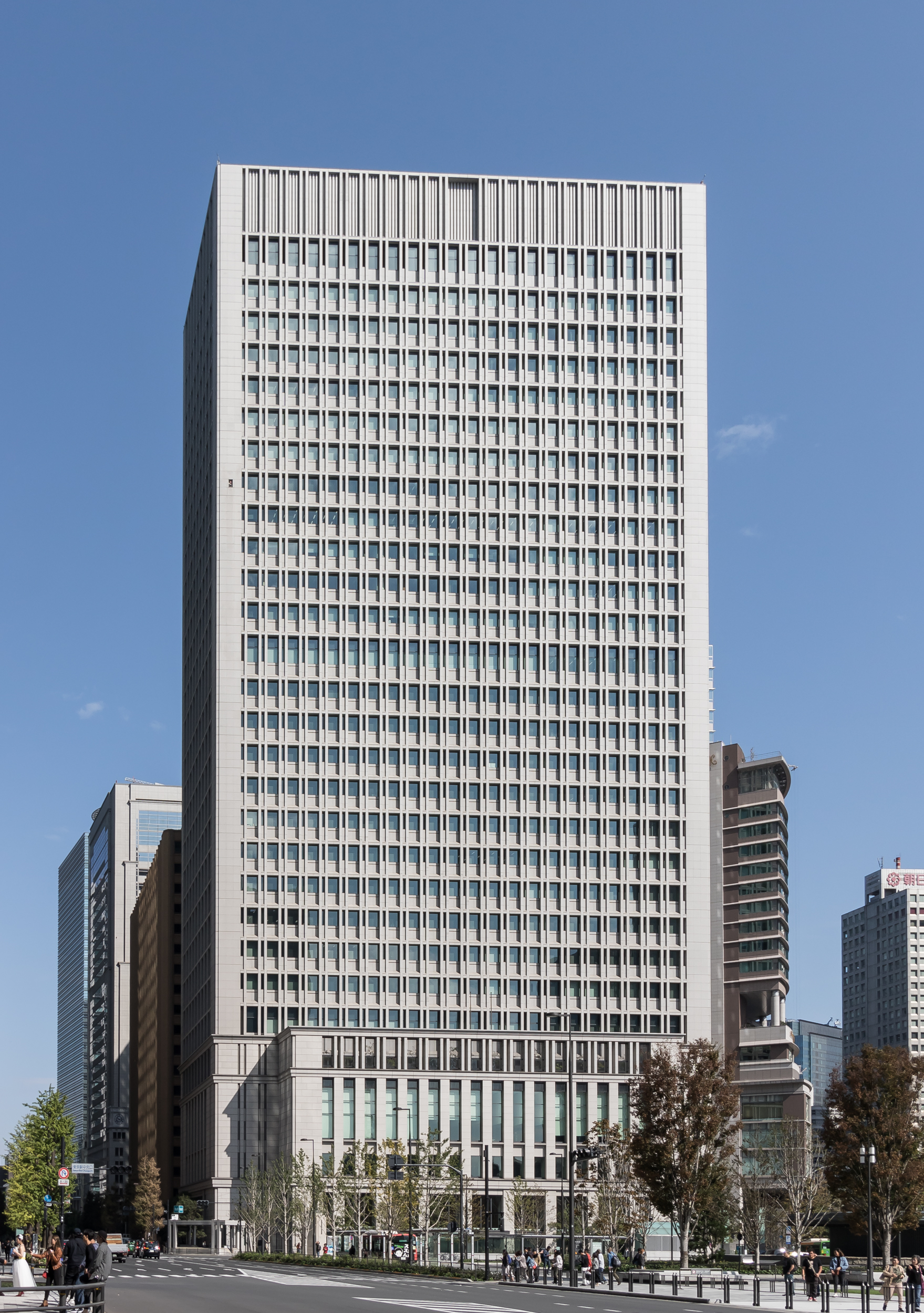
- Headquarters in Marunouchi, Chiyoda, Tokyo
- Native name: 株式会社日立製作所
- Romanized name: Kabushikigaisha Hitachi Seisaku-sho lit. "Share Company Hitachi Manufacturing Plant"
- Type: Public
- Traded as: TYO: 6501; NAG: 6501; Nikkei 225 component (TYO); TOPIX Core30 component (TYO)
- Industry: Conglomerate
- Founded: 1910; 116 years ago Hitachi, Ibaraki, Japan
- Founder: Namihei Odaira
- Headquarters: Marunouchi, Chiyoda-ku, Tokyo, Japan
- Area served: Worldwide
- Key people: Toshiaki Higashihara (Executive Chairman); Toshiaki Tokunaga (President and CEO)
- Products: Rolling stock & rail signalling systems; Power grid equipment & transformers; Data storage systems; Industrial automation & robotics; Elevators & escalators; Automotive electronics & powertrains; HVAC & home appliances; HVDC systems; Scientific & analytical instruments
- Services: IT consulting & systems integration; Digital engineering (GlobalLogic); Industrial IoT & analytics (Lumada); Energy & power grid solutions; Infrastructure maintenance & lifecycle management
- Revenue: ▲¥10.59 trillion (US$66.87 billion) (2025)
- Operating income: ▲¥1.2 trillion (US$7.57 billion) (2025)
- Net income: ▲¥802.3 billion (US$5.07 billion) (2025)
- Total assets: ▲¥15.04 trillion (US$95.01 billion) (2025)
- Total equity: ▲¥6.77 trillion (US$42.78 billion) (2025)
- Number of employees: 287,901 (2025)
- Website: hitachi.com

Hitachi, Ltd. (Note: 株式会社日立製作所, Kabushiki gaisha Hitachi Sēsakusho) (Japanese pronunciation: [çi̥.tä̀.c̟͡ɕì, -tä́.c̟͡ɕì]) is a Japanese multinational conglomerate founded in 1910 and headquartered in Chiyoda, Tokyo. The company is active in various industries, including digital systems, power and renewable energy, railway systems, healthcare products, and financial systems. The company was founded as an electrical machinery manufacturing subsidiary of the Kuhara Mining Plant in Hitachi, Ibaraki, by engineer Namihei Odaira in 1910. It began operating as an independent company under its current name in 1920.

Hitachi is listed on the Tokyo Stock Exchange and is a key component of the Nikkei 225 and TOPIX Core30 indices. As of June 2024, it has a market capitalisation of 16.9 trillion yen, making it the fourth largest Japanese company by market value. In terms of global recognition, Hitachi was ranked 38th in the 2012 Fortune Global 500 and 129th in the 2012 Forbes Global 2000. Hitachi is a highly globalised conglomerate. In the fiscal year 2025, it generated approximately 63% of its total revenue of 10.6 trillion yen from international markets. The major contributors to this global revenue were Europe, Asia, and North America, with each region accounting for 21%, 18%, and 16% of the total revenue, respectively.

== Overview ==
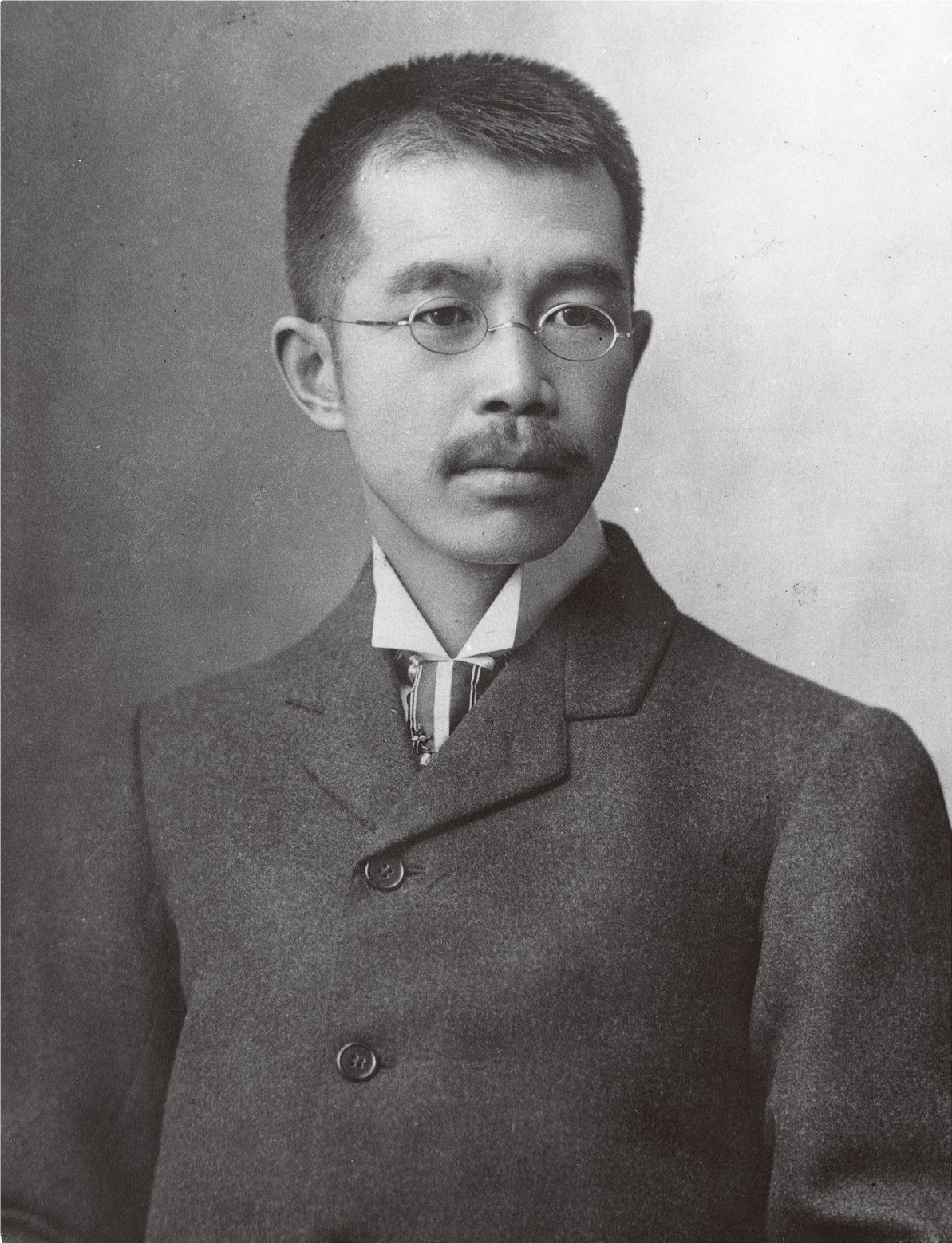
Namihei Odaira, the founder of Hitachi

Historically a large conglomerate active in various fields, including electric generators, consumer electronics, trains, semiconductors, computers, and nuclear reactors, Hitachi recorded a record loss of 787.3 billion yen in the aftermath of the 2008 financial crisis. The company sold numerous unprofitable operations and ventured into new areas such as digital systems and renewable energy. As a result of these moves, Hitachi returned to profitability by March 2011.

Today, Hitachi's corporate activities are organised into three large sections: Digital Systems and Services, Green Energy and Mobility, and Connective Industries.

All 12 CEOs the company has had, including founder Odaira, have had engineering backgrounds, with eight of them, including Odaira, being alumni of the University of Tokyo's Faculty of Engineering.

=== Logos and symbols ===
1968–1992 Hitachi logo with the corporate symbol on the left

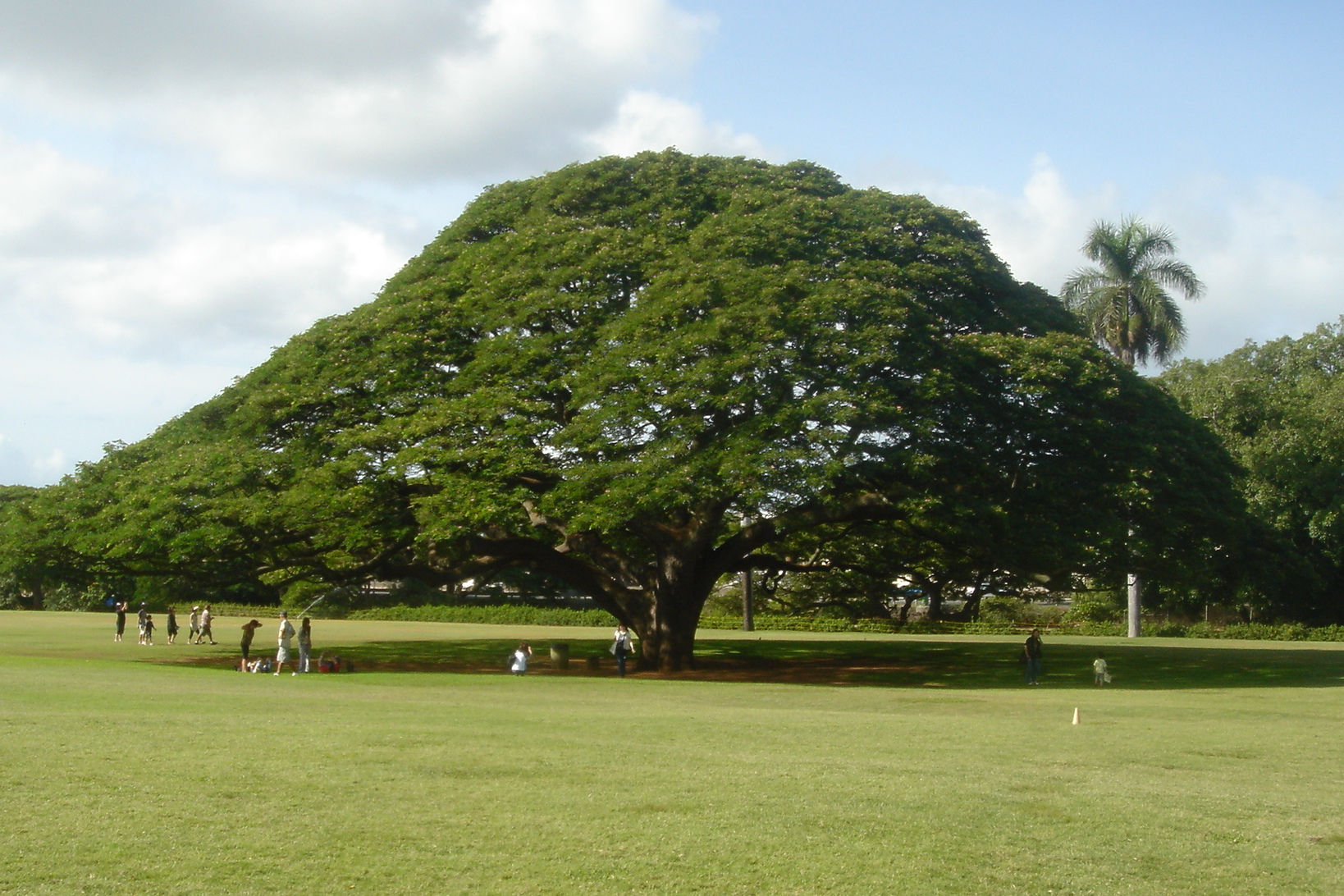
The Hitachi Tree at Moanalua Gardens

Hitachi has been using a monogram of the two Kanji characters that make up the word 'Hitachi' (日立) as its corporate symbol (monshō). Conceived by Namihei Odaira, this symbol appeared on most of Hitachi's products until 1991. In 2000, Hitachi adopted the advertising slogan 'Inspire the Next', and the corporate logo was gradually phased out as this statement was incorporated into the branding. However, the symbol is still used to represent the company rather than its products or services, such as in the favicon of its official website.

Since 1975, Hitachi has been using images of a currently-183-year-old Samanea saman tree, known as the Hitachi Tree (hitachi no ki), located at Moanalua Gardens, Hawaii, in most of its television commercials as a symbol of the conglomerate. The advert song introduced alongside the tree is also called Hitachi no Ki, or Konoki Nanno Ki (lit. 'What tree is this?'), after the song's opening lyrics. Three other trees have briefly represented the company, but since 1984, the current tree has been designated as the Hitachi Tree. In 2016, it was reported that the company spends around 50 million yen annually on its maintenance.

== History ==
=== Founding (1910–1945) ===
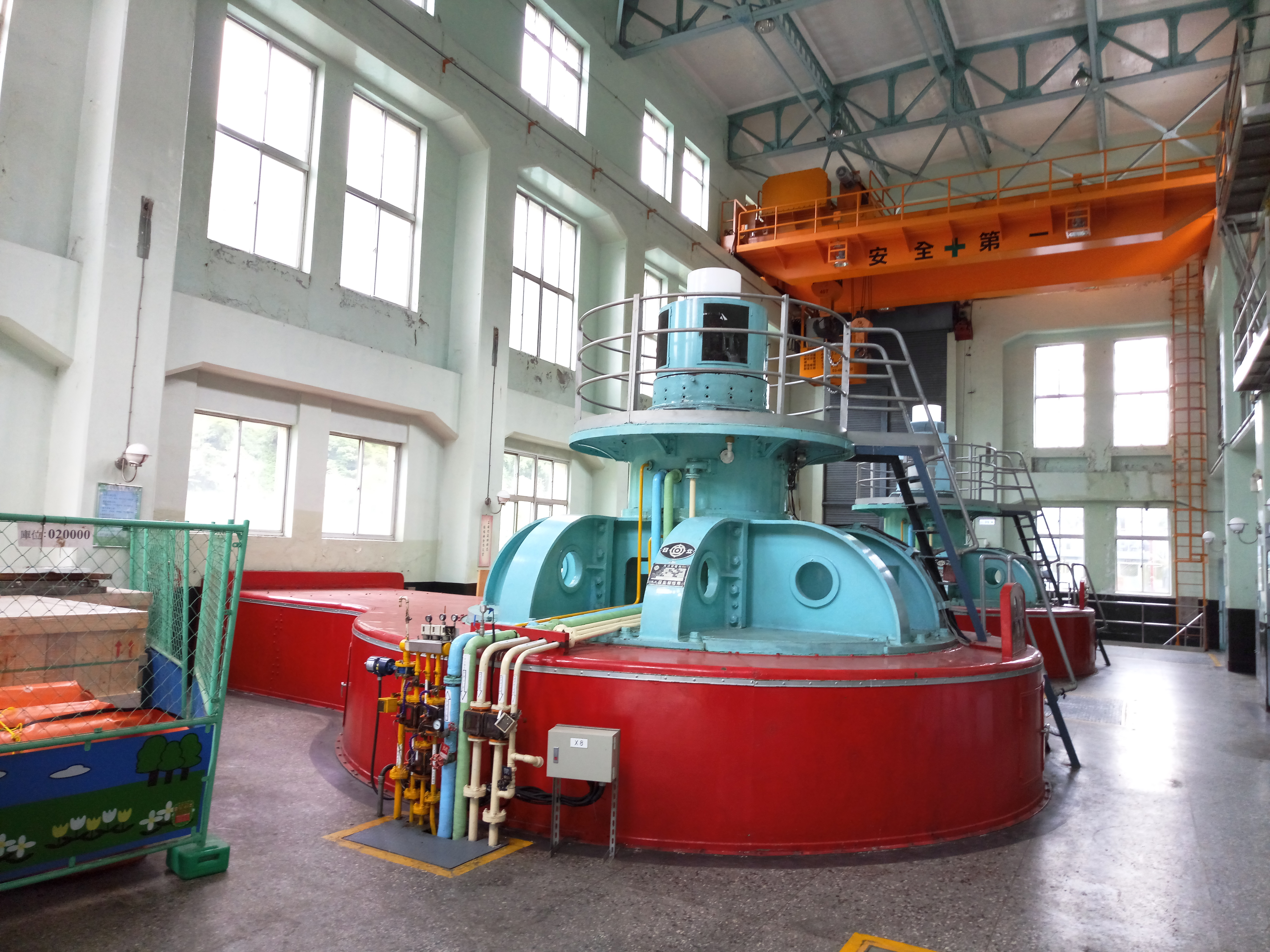
Two Hitachi water turbines, built in 1939, still in use in Taiwan. Motors and generators were among Hitachi's earliest products.

Founded in 1910 in Ibaraki Prefecture by electrical engineer Namihei Odaira, Hitachi's first product was a 4-kilowatt induction motor, designed for copper mining. Originally an in-house venture of Fusanosuke Kuhara's mining company, Hitachi became independent in 1911 and moved its headquarters to Tokyo in 1918. The company's name 'Hitachi', combining the kanji for 'sun' (日, hi) and 'rise' (立, tachi), was coined by Odaira. While industrial machinery in Japan was usually powered by steam at the time, Odaira built water power stations in the mine and electrified almost all facilities in the factory. The company developed various electrical equipment later in its history. In 1924, Hitachi completed Japan's first mainline electric locomotive (JNR Class ED15). In 1932, the company started manufacturing elevators and electric refrigerators.

The company also manufactured parts for the Imperial Japanese Armed Forces, such as the Hitachi Hatsukaze plane engine (produced from 1929 until the end of World War II) for both the Imperial Japanese Army and Imperial Japanese Navy.

=== Post-war reconstruction and expansion (1945–1990) ===
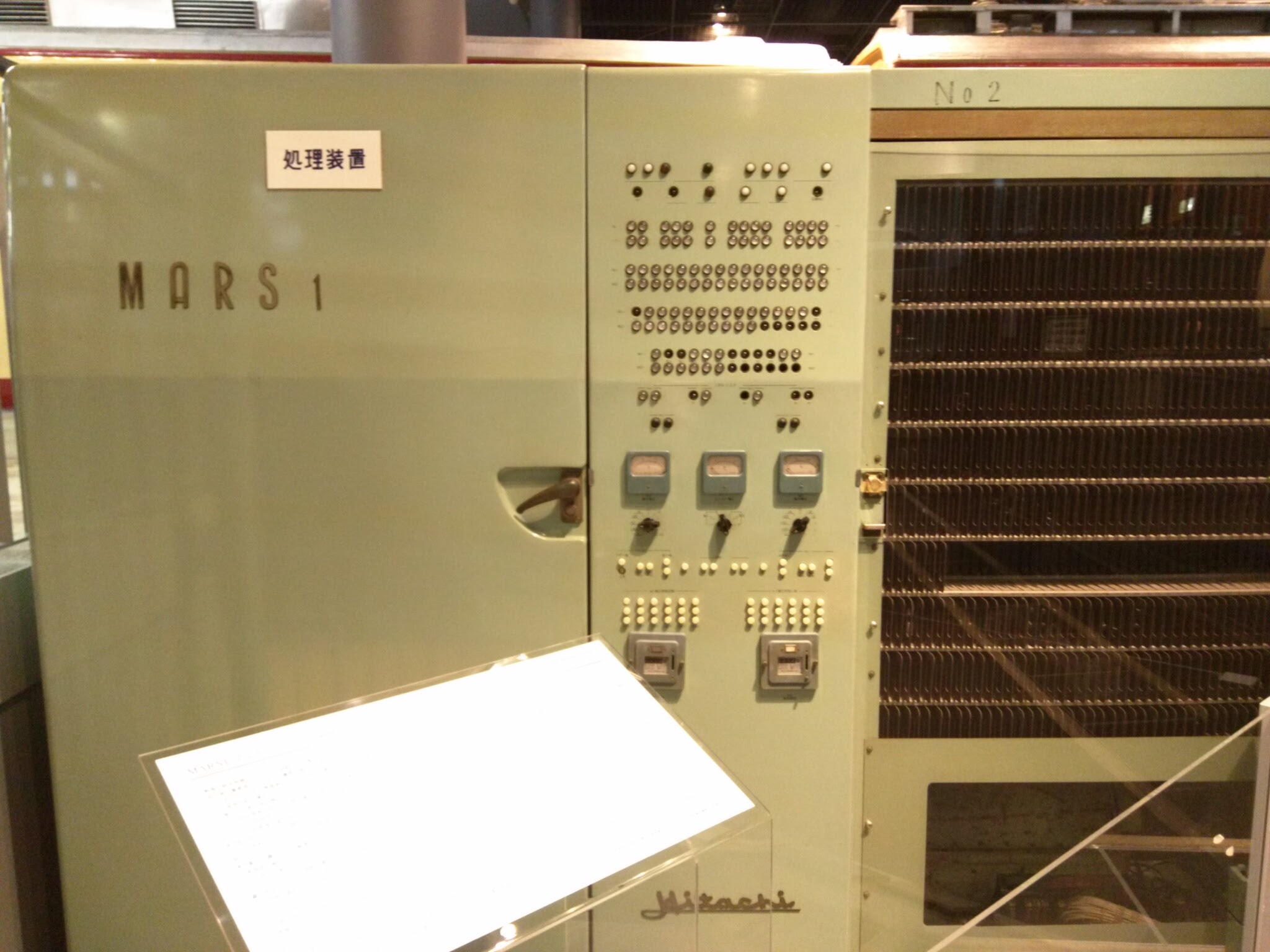
MARS-1 central computer preserved at the Railway Museum

World War II and its aftermath significantly impacted Hitachi, leading to the destruction of factories, post-war internal discord, and the removal of founder Namihei Odaira by the Allied occupation forces. Hitachi went public in 1949, listing on the Tokyo Exchange (TYO:6501). Odaira returned to the company in 1951 when the purge of key pre-war Japanese figures ended. However, he died in October of the same year at age 77. In 1949, Hitachi built its first power shovel, marking the start of what is now Hitachi Construction Machinery. In 1960, Hitachi developed the world's first electric train seat reservation system, MARS-1, for Japanese National Railways (JNR), allowing nationwide booking for express train seats. Around the same time, Hitachi began expanding its business overseas, with the establishment of Hitachi America, Ltd. 1959. In 1961, Hitachi began selling fully-automated washing machines and completed its first experimental nuclear reactor.

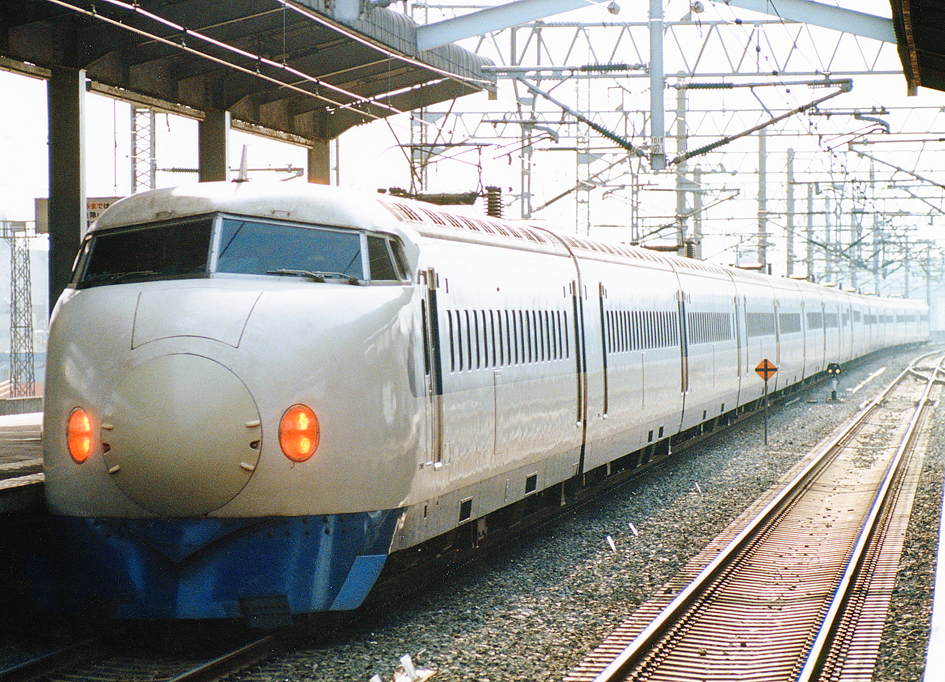
Hitachi played a crucial role in the development of the Shinkansen.

In 1964, the world's first high-speed railway line, the Shinkansen, opened. Hitachi not only built the Series 0 rolling stock but also played a crucial part in developing the Automatic Train Control system (ATC) and the Computer-Aided Traffic Control System (COMTRAC). COMTRAC was the first Programmed Traffic Control (PTC) system, a real-time automatic control system to control rail transport, which was installed on JNR's Tokaido Shinkansen and Sanyo Shinkansen lines simultaneously with the extension from Shin-Osaka Station to Okayama Station in 1972. In 1977, Hitachi completed the world's first fully MOX-fuelled nuclear power station, Fugen. MOX was seen as an efficient way of utilising plutonium from nuclear waste, which would otherwise have to be stored in security to ensure that it is not used to build nuclear weapons.

In 1978, Hitachi's Twin-Well Hi-CMOS process ushered in a new era in the global semiconductor industry. For instance, the Hitachi HM6147 chip, developed by a Hitachi team led by Toshiaki Masuhara, was able to match the Intel's flagship 2147 HMOS's performance with 87 per cent less power. Until the early 1980s, American semiconductor producers were focusing on the development and production of NMOS transistors, with which it dominated the global market, while Hitachi invested heavily in developing efficient CMOS transistors. This success led to the world's three largest manufacturers by revenue all being Japanese companies by 1987, amongst which Hitachi was counted. Hitachi Europe, Ltd. was established in 1982.

In 1989, Hitachi Research Lab engineers performed the famous two-slit experiment using its new electron-transmitting display technology, with the goal to see what happens when individual electrons pass through a double-slit, one at a time — testing whether interference (a wave behavior) still appears even when there are no pairs of electrons to “interfere” with each other. What they saw at first, showed random dots on the screen, one by one. However, over time — as more electrons were fired — a pattern of alternating bright and dark bands appeared. This was the same interference pattern seen in Young’s light experiment.

=== 2000s ===
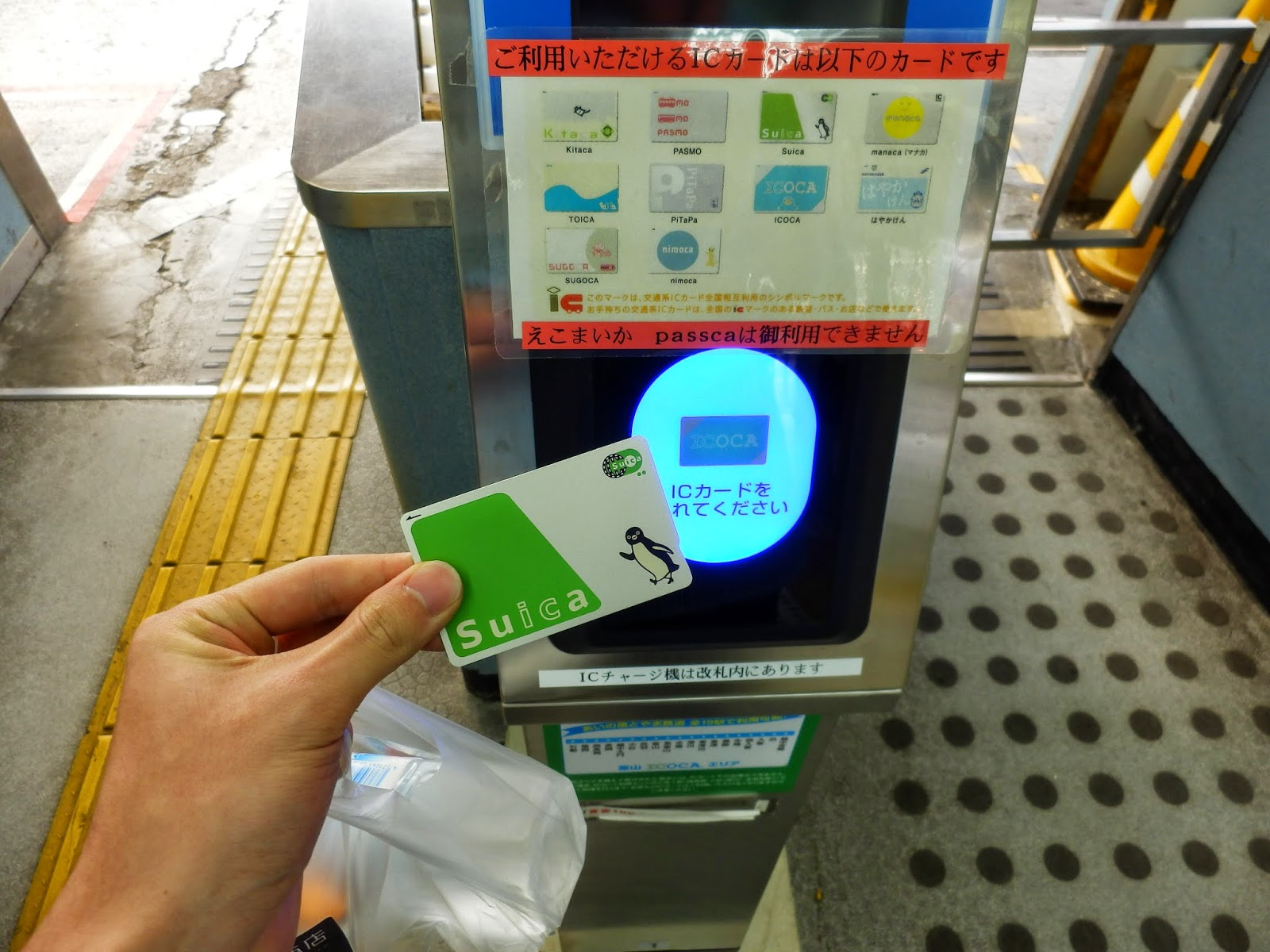
Hitachi played a central role in the development of Suica.

In 2001, the contactless fare card system Suica was introduced at 424 JR East stations throughout the Greater Tokyo Area. While the card itself was developed using Sony's FeliCa system, Hitachi was responsible for building the server-side system. Other contactless fare card systems such as ICOCA and PASMO have been introduced throughout the country since, almost all of which are modelled after Suica and thus mutually compatible. It is now widely used as a contactless payment system in non-railway business as well, and Hitachi has been involved in the series of developments in this area. At the CES 2007, Hitachi revealed the first consumer HDD with a storage of 1 TB, which was released in the same year.

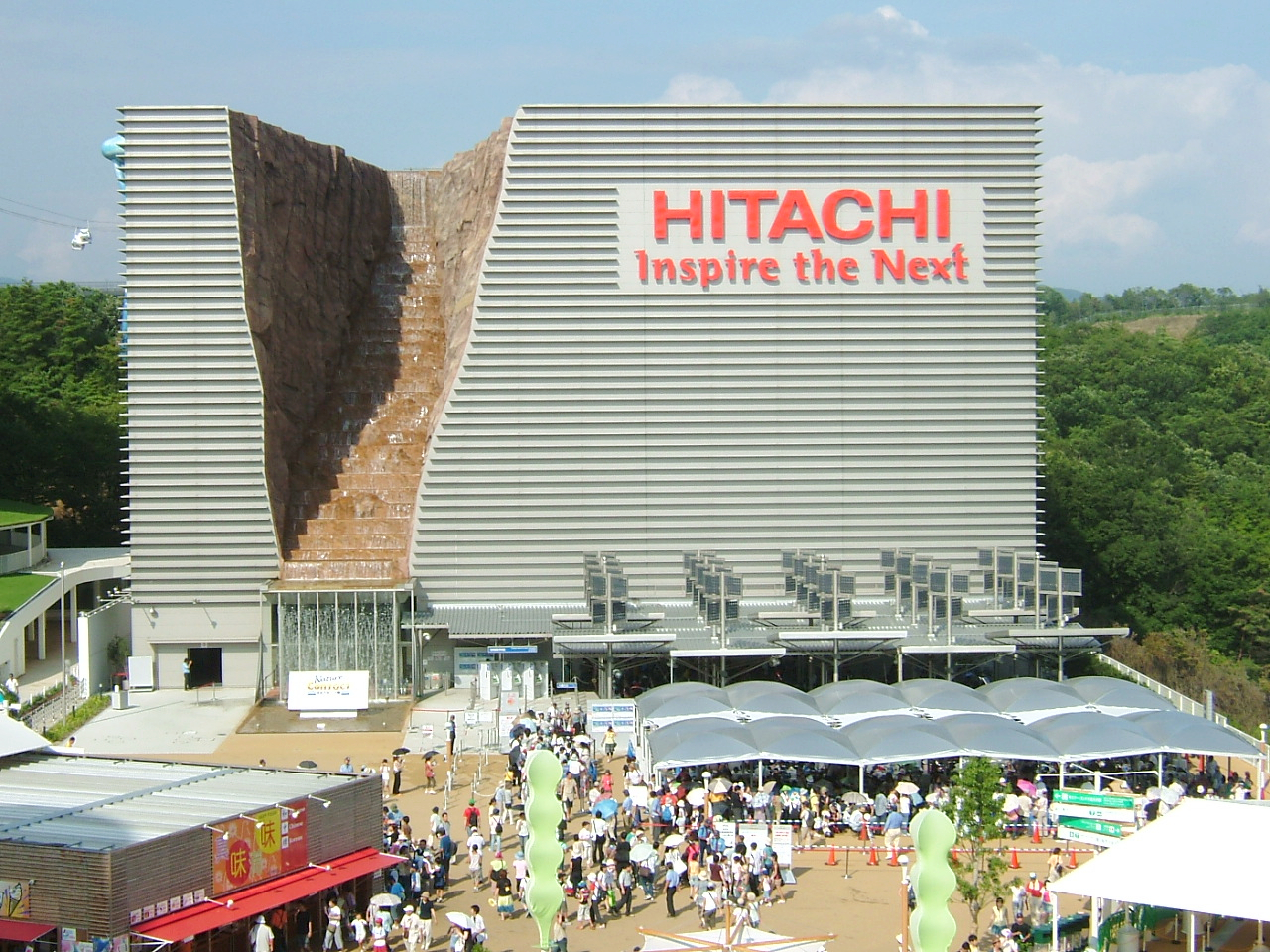
Hitachi Pavilion at EXPO 2005

In the 2008 fiscal year, Hitachi lost US$7.8 billion, the largest corporate loss in Japanese history up to that point. Since its zenith in the 1980s and 1990s, a number of departments had suffered a decline in efficiency. However, being one of the largest conglomerates in the world at the time, conflicts of interest existed across the company, making it difficult to implement fundamental solutions. These delays in essential reforms proved detrimental when facing the 2008 financial crisis and led to the record loss. This prompted Hitachi to restructure and sell a number of divisions and businesses under the leadership of Takashi Kawamura. From 2008 to 2018, Hitachi reduced the number of its listed group companies and consolidated subsidiaries in Japan from 22 to 4 and around 400 to 202, respectively, through restructuring and sell-offs. It plans to become a company specializing in IT and infrastructure maintenance in the near future.

=== 2010s ===
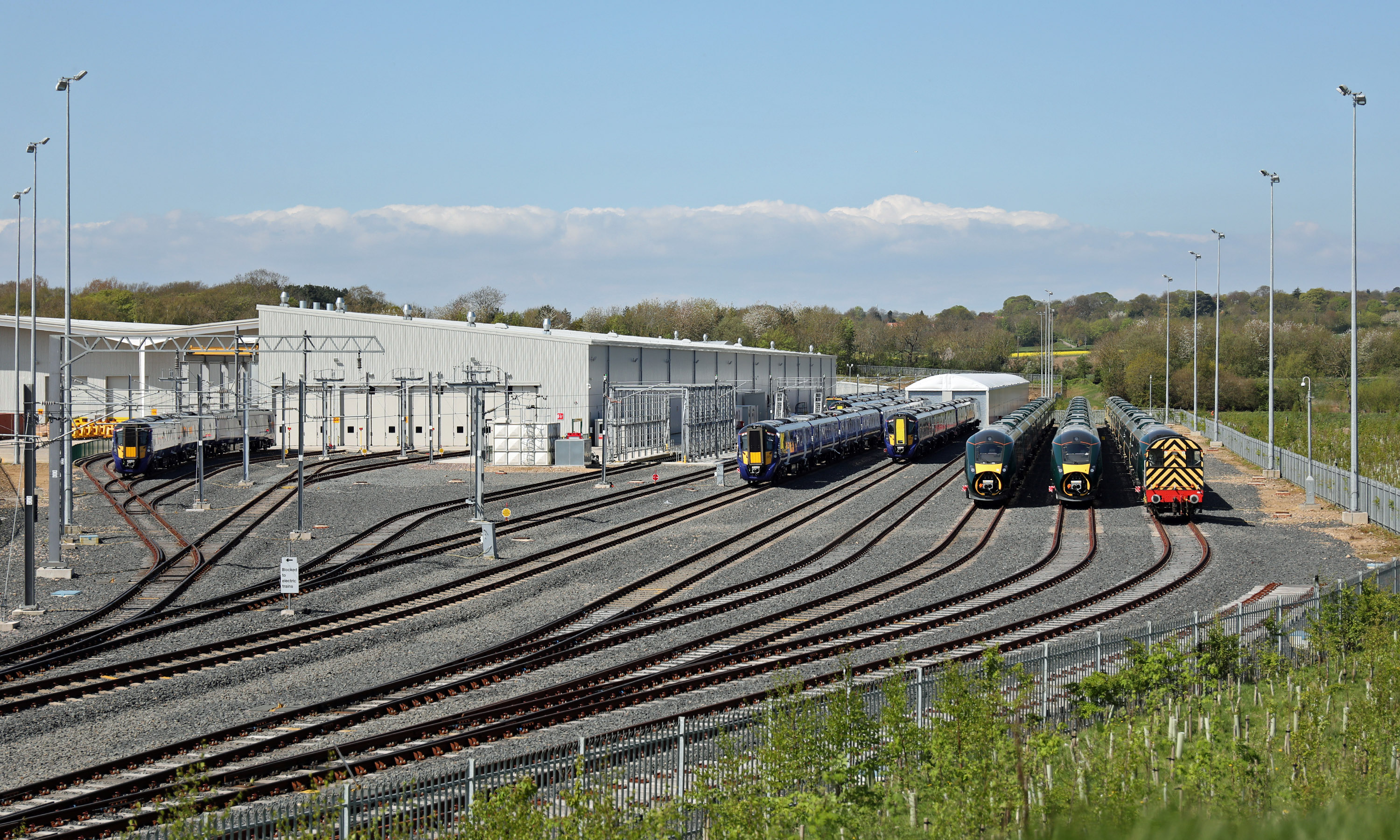
New trains outside Hitachi's Newton Aycliffe facility; Class 385s and Class 800/3s are in the yard.

In March 2011, Hitachi agreed to sell its hard disk drive subsidiary, HGST, to Western Digital for a combination of cash and shares worth US$4.3 billion. Due to concerns of a duopoly of WD and Seagate Technology by the EU Commission and the Federal Trade Commission, Hitachi's 3.5" HDD division was sold to Toshiba. The transaction was completed in March 2012.

In January 2012, Hitachi announced it would stop producing televisions in Japan. In September 2012, Hitachi announced that it had invented a long-term data storage made out of quartz glass that was capable of preserving information for millions of years. In October 2012, Hitachi agreed to acquire the United Kingdom-based nuclear energy company Horizon Nuclear Power, which plans to construct up to six nuclear power plants in the UK, from E.ON and RWE for £700 million. In November 2012, Hitachi and Mitsubishi Heavy Industries agreed to merge their thermal power generation businesses into a joint venture to be owned 65% by Mitsubishi Heavy Industries and 35% by Hitachi. The joint venture named Mitsubishi Hitachi Power Systems (MHPS) began operations in February 2014. In 2020 Hitachi transferred its share of the venture to MHI.

In October 2015, Hitachi completed a deal with Johnson Controls to form a joint venture that would take over Hitachi's HVAC business. Hitachi maintained a 40% stake in the resulting company, Johnson Controls-Hitachi Air Conditioning. In May 2016, Hitachi announced it was investing $2.8 billion into its IoT interests. Hitachi’s rail business in Europe, especially in the United Kingdom, expanded in the 2010s, with Hitachi Newton Aycliffe starting operations in October 2015.

Following the Fukushima Daiichi nuclear disaster in 2011 and the extended temporary closure of most Japanese nuclear plants, Hitachi's nuclear business became unprofitable and in 2016 Hitachi CEO Toshiaki Higashihara argued Japan should consider a merger of the various competing nuclear businesses. Hitachi is taking for 2016 an estimated ¥65 billion write-off in value of a SILEX technology laser uranium enrichment joint venture with General Electric.

In February 2017, Hitachi and Honda announced a partnership to develop, produce and sell motors for electric vehicles. Also in 2017, private equity firm KKR bought Hitachi Kokusai's (itself a subsidiary of Hitachi) semiconductor equipment division, becoming Kokusai Electric. In 2019, Applied Materials announced that it would acquire Kokusai Electric from KKR for US$2.2 billion. The deal was later terminated in 2021. In 2017, KKR also bought Hitachi's power tools subsidiary Hitachi Koki for US$1.3 billion, changing its name to Koki Holdings (HiKOKI) and marketing its tools as Metabo HPT in the US market. In 2018, Hitachi stopped selling televisions in Japan because its market share had dropped to 1%, opting to sell Sony TVs through its existing dealer network. On March 14, 2018, Zoomdata announced its partnership with Hitachi INS Software to help develop big data analytics market in Japan.

In December 2018, Hitachi Ltd. announced it would take over 80% of ABB's power grid division for $6.4 billion renaming it Hitachi-ABB Power Grids in the process. In October 2021, the enterprise was rebranded Hitachi Energy. In 2019, Hitachi sold its medical imaging business to Fujifilm for US$1.7 billion. Showa Denko bought Hitachi Chemical from Hitachi and other shareholders, at US$42.97 per share. Until then, Hitachi Chemical had been considered to be a core unit of the group. Hitachi also suspended the ABWR development by its British subsidiary Horizon Nuclear Power as it did not provide adequate "economic rationality as a private enterprise" to proceed. In October 2019, the talks between Honda and Hitachi to consolidate their four automotive parts businesses, Showa, Nissin and Keihin of the former and the latter's Hitachi Automotive Systems, have reportedly begun, resulting in the creation of a "mega supplier" named Hitachi Astemo incorporated in January 2021.

=== 2020s ===
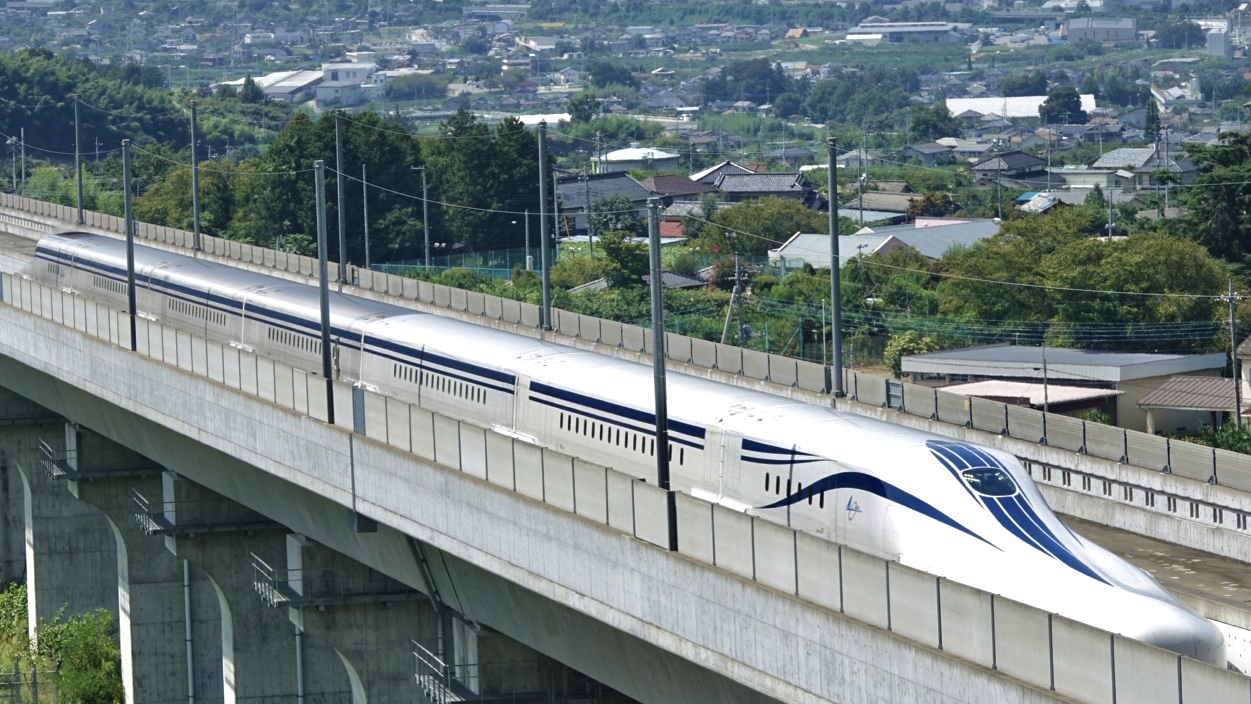
L0-950, first Maglev train manufactured by Hitachi

In March 2020, an improved version of the L0 Series SCMaglev rolling stock for the Chuo Shinkansen was introduced, marking the first magnetically levitated train manufactured by Hitachi. In September 2020, Hitachi abandoned plans to create nuclear power plants in Gloucestershire and Wales due to issues with funding due to the impact of COVID-19. In the same month, Hitachi Capital agreed to be bought by its second-largest shareholder, business partner, and former rival Mitsubishi UFJ Lease, which invested in the Hitachi subsidiary in 2016. In November 2020, it announced that Hitachi Metals and Hitachi Construction Machinery, both being some of the last remaining listed subsidiaries, will likely be detached from the group according to the restructuring plan. In December, Hitachi sold a 60% stake in its overseas home appliance business to Turkish Arcelik for US$300 million. In December 2021, it was announced by OPG that it had selected GE-Hitachi to construct two BWRX-300 reactors at the Darlington site in Ontario, Canada. OPG and GE-Hitachi will be collaborating on the design, planning and preparation of license materials for the construction of Canada's first SMR which is planned to enter operation in 2028.

Hitachi, with its focus on energy, information technology, and infrastructure, has seen a significant improvement in profitability since the record loss in 2009. Reflecting this, Hitachi's market capitalisation has more than octupled since 2010, becoming the fourth largest company in Japan by market capitalisation in June 2024.

In July 2024, Bosch announced the acquisition of the Johnson Controls–Hitachi Air Conditioning (JCH) joint venture—comprising Johnson Controls' 60% and Hitachi's 40%. The deal, Bosch's largest-ever acquisition. It includes 16 manufacturing plants and 12 engineering centers across 30+ countries, supporting about 12,000 employees; together with Bosch's current team, the combined unit will comprise over 26,000 staff. Bosch will continue selling under the Hitachi brands in Asia via long-term licensing and retain manufacturing facilities like the Shimizu plant in Japan under its control. Closing is expected in the next 12 months, pending regulatory approvals, with strategic aims of expanding Bosch's presence in HVAC globally, especially in the U.S. and Asia, and driving growth through energy-efficient, low-carbon heating and cooling solutions.

In September 2025, Hitachi announced a $457 million investment to expand its South Boston transformer manufacturing facility in order to build more power grid components.

== Businesses ==
Hitachi's corporate activities are organised into three large sections: Digital Systems and Services, Green Energy and Mobility, and Connective Industries.

=== Digital Systems & Services ===
The Digital Systems and Services segment features Lumada, through which the company provides digital solutions to improve business processes and operational efficiency. This segment accounted for 21.9 percent of the total revenue in FY2022.

- Internet of Things
  - Hitachi Lumada
- Data storage and analytics
  - Virtual Storage Platform
  - Optical disc drives – jointly with LG as Hitachi-LG Data Storage
- VOS3 Mainframe computer operating system
- Software
- Outsourcing services
- Telecommunications equipment
- ATMs

==== Hitachi Vantara ====
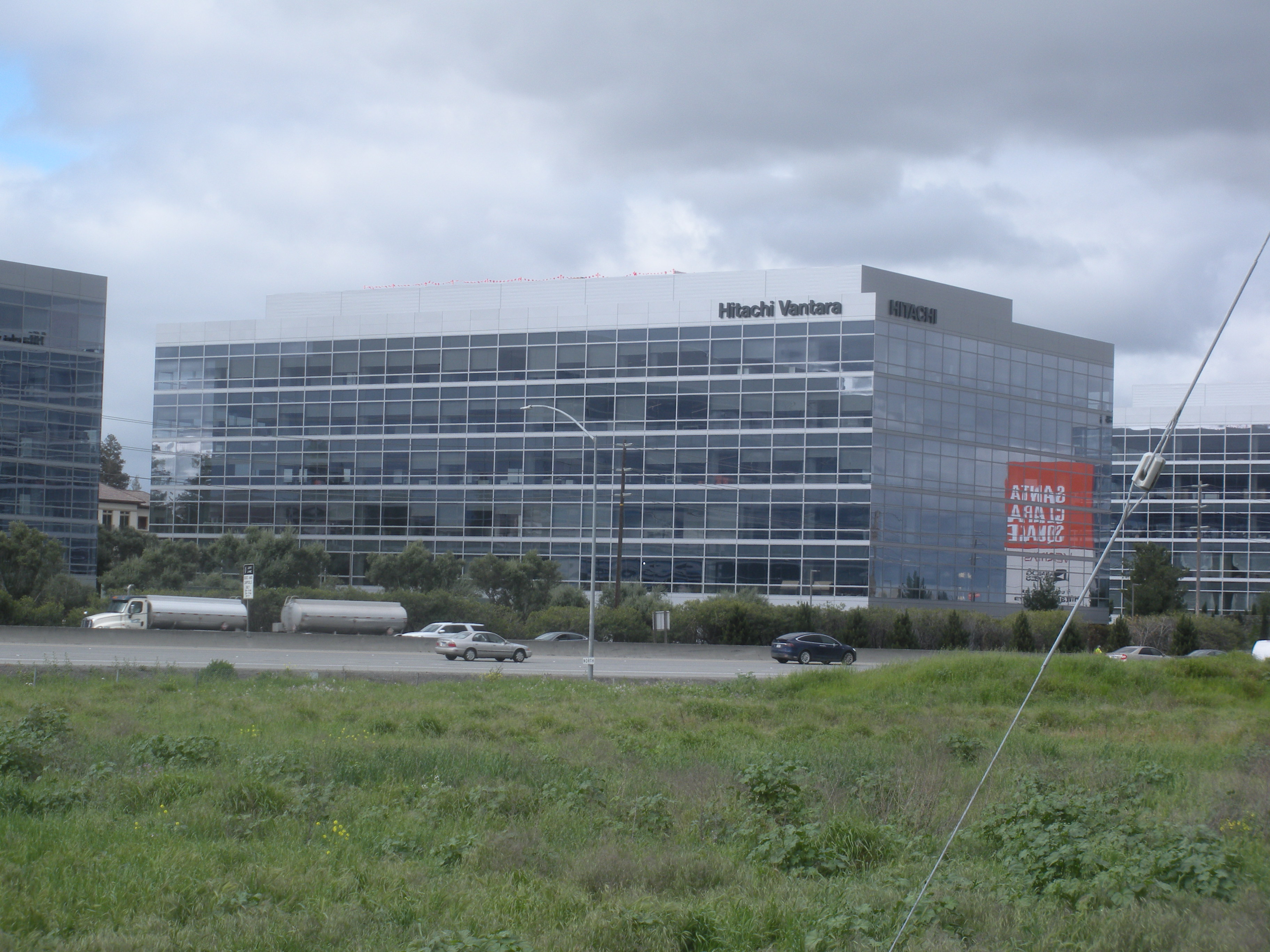
Hitachi Vantara headquarters in California, United States

Hitachi Vantara is a wholly owned subsidiary of Hitachi which provides hardware, software and services to help companies manage their digital data. Its flagship products are the Virtual Storage Platform (for enterprise storage), Hitachi Unified Storage VM for large-sized companies, Hitachi Unified Storage for small and mid-sized companies, Hitachi Content Platform (archiving and cloud architecture), Hitachi Command Suite (for storage management), Hitachi TrueCopy and Hitachi Universal Replicator (for remote replication), and the Hitachi NAS Platform.

Since September 19, 2017, Hitachi Data Systems (HDS) has become part of Hitachi Vantara, a new company that unifies the operations of Pentaho, Hitachi Data Systems and Hitachi Insight Group. The company name "Hitachi Data Systems" (HDS) and its logo is no longer used in the market. Hitachi Consulting, the group's international management and technology consulting subsidiary with headquarters in Dallas, Texas, was integrated with Hitachi Vantara in 2019. On November 1, 2023, Hitachi spun off Hitachi Vantara LLC's digital solutions business into a new company, Hitachi Digital Services; Hitachi Vantara now focuses on its storage and hybrid cloud-centric data infrastructure services portfolio. The company would partner with Supermicro in October 2025, each allowing the other company to offer their products through the opposing companies, focusing on artificial intelligence applications and data lakehouses.

- Servers
- Disk array subsystems

==== GlobalLogic ====
GlobalLogic is a digital services subsidiary of Hitachi based in the United States. Originally founded in 2000, the company was acquired by Hitachi in 2021 for US$9.6 billion, which was Hitachi's most expensive acquisition at the time. The acquisition is intended to bridge various operational technology and industrial products that Hitachi offers by strengthening the group's software development capability as part of the broader Lumada strategy. GlobalLogic provides outsourced product development and IT services to clients for software and hardware.

==== Hitachi Solutions ====
Hitachi Solutions is a global professional services subsidiary of Hitachi, headquartered in Irvine, California. Founded in 2002 and integrated into the Hitachi Group in 2012, the company specializes in Microsoft-based digital transformation across industries such as construction, financial services, health care, retail, manufacturing, sports and entertainment, and energy. With over 5,000 employees worldwide, Hitachi Solutions delivers consulting, cloud enablement, data analytics, and AI-powered solutions through platforms like Dynamics 365, Azure, and Power Platform. Its proprietary offerings include the Hitachi Solutions Empower Data Platform.

=== Green Energy and Mobility ===
The Green Energy and Mobility segment focuses on developing and providing power systems. This includes power generation, transmission, and distribution systems. In the rail industry, the company is a provider of rolling stock and traction equipment to signaling, traffic management systems, and maintenance depots. A key component of this segment is the ZeroCarbon suite, designed to enable fleet operators to transition to electric vehicles. This segment accounted for 22.9 per cent of the total revenue in FY2022.

==== Hitachi Rail ====
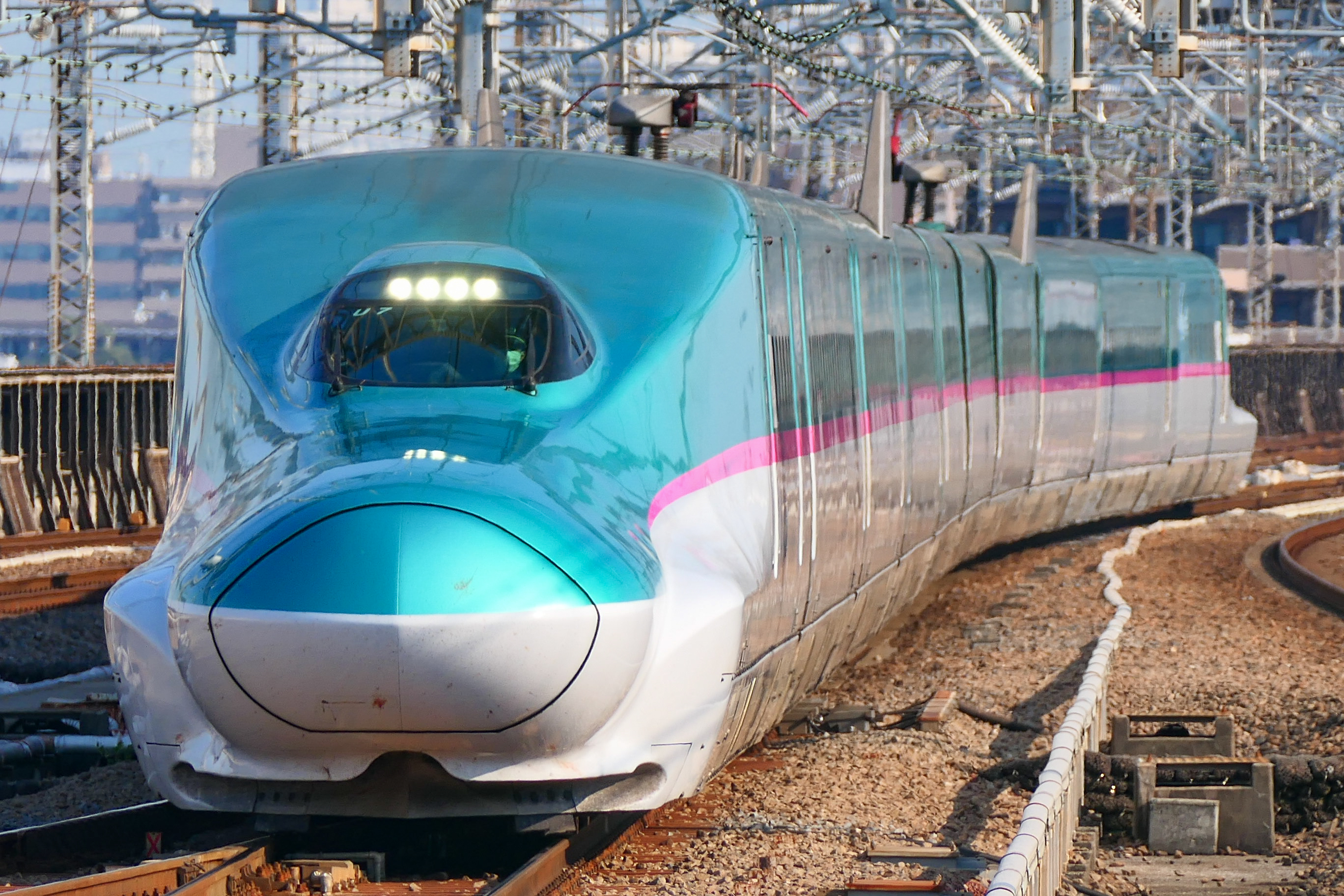
E5 Series Shinkansen

Hitachi built its first steam locomotive in 1920 and has since evolved into a company that builds almost everything related to rail transport; rolling stock, traction systems, power transmission systems, signaling systems, programmed traffic control systems, and seat reservation systems.

Hitachi's rail division has two hubs in Japan; Mito in Ibaraki and Kasado in Kudamatsu, Yamaguchi. The international rail business, branded as Hitachi Rail, is headquartered in London, England, with its main European factory located in Newton Aycliffe, County Durham. Since Hitachi Rail Italy was established following the acquisition of AnsaldoBreda S.p.A., Hitachi has a design and production hub in Pistoia, Italy.

- Hitachi A-train

==== Hitachi Energy ====
In July 2020, Hitachi acquired 80.1% of ABB’s power grid business for 750 billion yen (US$6.5 billion) and completed the acquisition with the remaining 19.9% in December 2022. Merged with Hitachi’s own power grid operations, the entity has become a major supplier of high-voltage direct current transmission systems.

==== Nuclear power ====
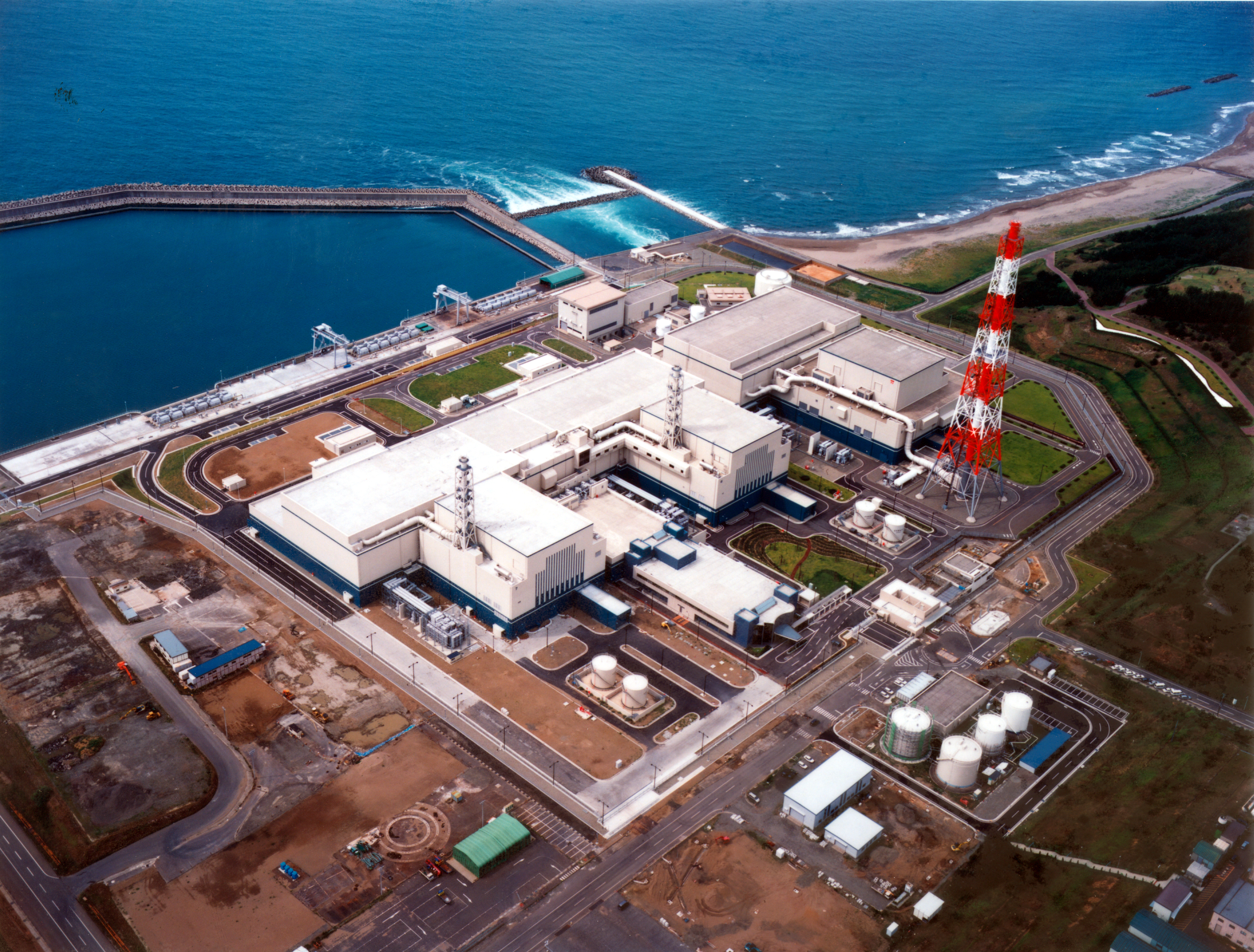
Kashiwazaki-Kariwa Nuclear Power Plant

Hitachi has been involved in the nuclear power industry since the 1950s and has been active in constructing and maintaining boiling water reactors (BWRs) since the 1970s.

In 2007, Hitachi's nuclear business merged with that of General Electric to form GE Hitachi Nuclear Energy. The joint venture, now called GE Vernova Hitachi Nuclear Energy following the breakup of General Electric, currently offers the advanced boiling water reactor (ABWR) and is developing small modular reactors (SMRs), such as the BWRX-300.

Hitachi also owns Horizon Nuclear Power, which was originally expected to construct nuclear power stations in the United Kingdom under a British government contract, but later withdrew from these projects after investing nearly £2 billion.

=== Connective Industries ===
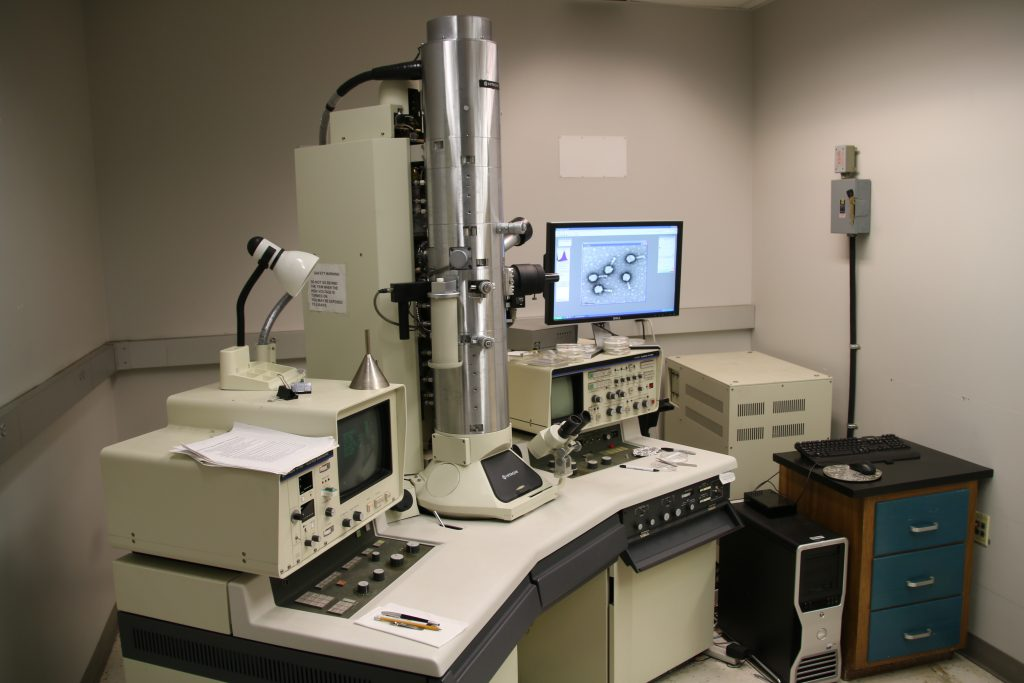
Hitachi transmission electron microscope (TEM)

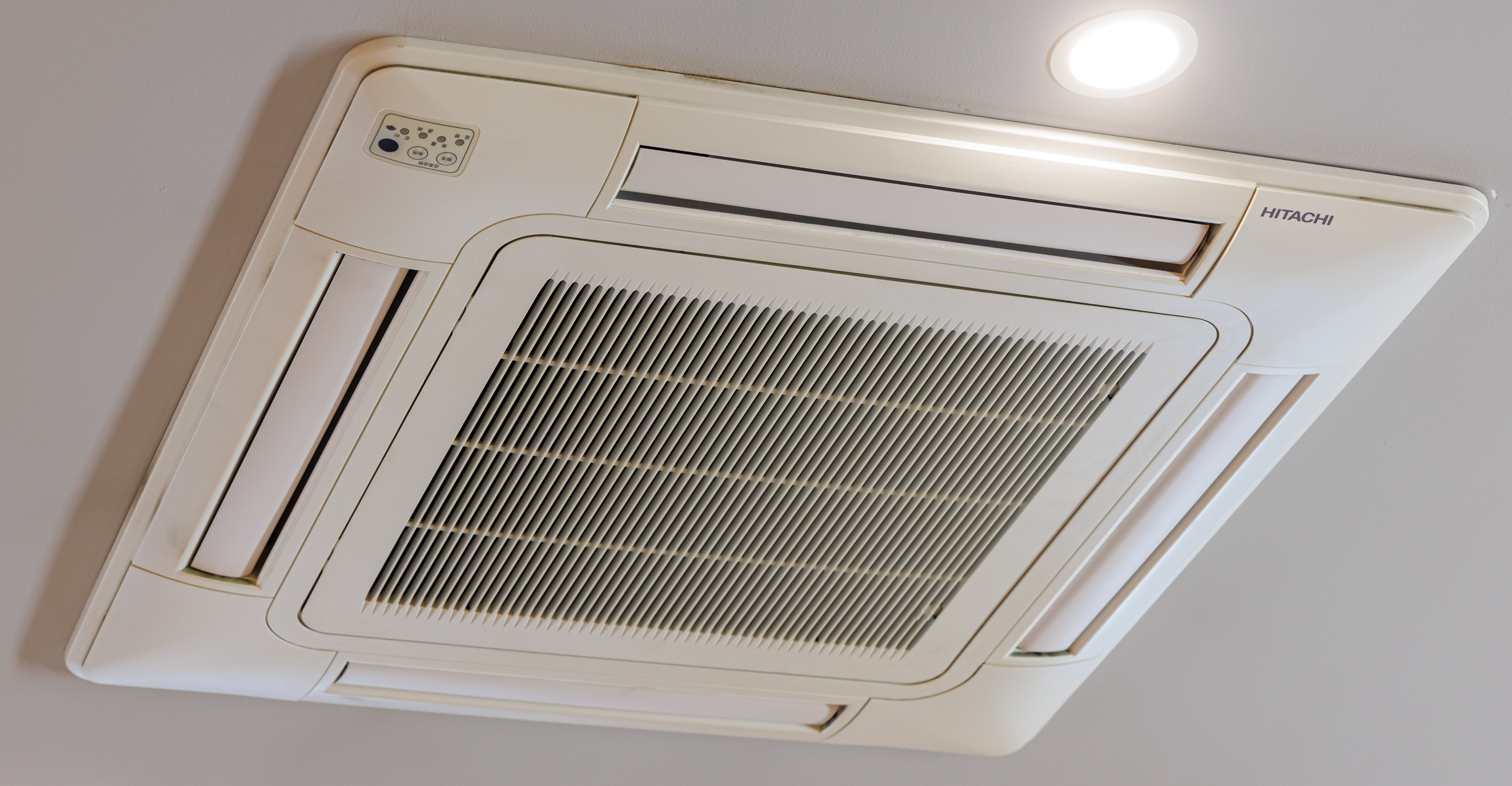
Hitachi ceiling mounted cassette air conditioner

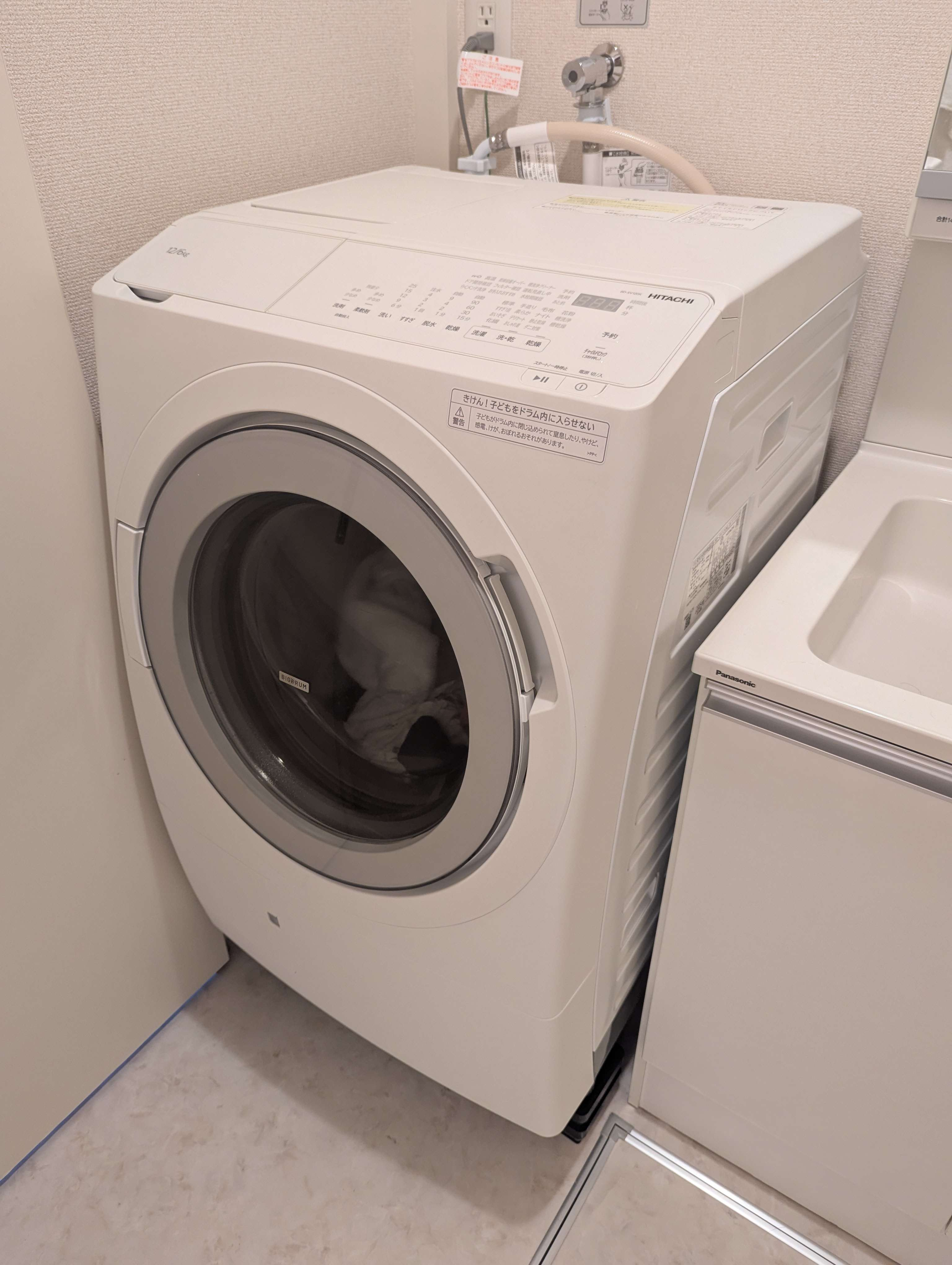
Hitachi washer-dryer

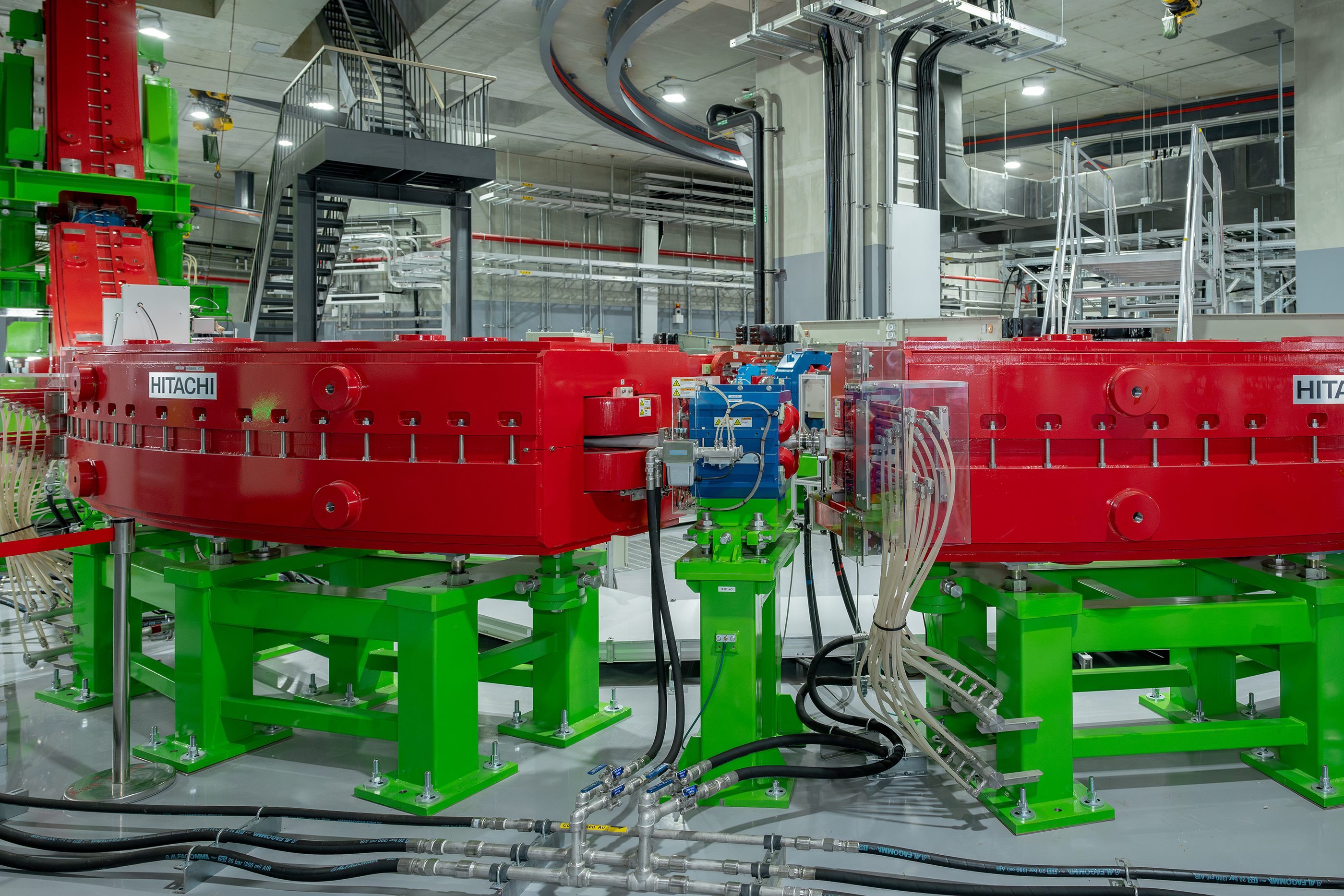
Hitachi synchrotron used for heavy ion particle therapy

In the Connective Industries segment, Hitachi offers building systems such as elevators and escalators, healthcare with a focus on less invasive cancer treatments and diverse medical equipment, and a variety of industrial equipment such as air compressors and transformers. Additionally, the segment provides sustainable water and wastewater management. This segment accounted for 27.3 per cent of the total revenue in FY2022.

==== Hitachi Global Life Solutions and Living Systems ====
Although no longer a core business, Hitachi Global Life Solutions produces refrigerators, laundry machines, vacuum cleaners and other white goods while Hitachi Living Systems distributes Electric Fans and is produced by Airmate. Hitachi stopped producing televisions (branded as 'Wooo') in 2012.

- Air conditioning systems: development and production has been merged with Johnson Controls as Johnson Controls Hitachi.
- Refrigerators
- Laundry machines, including washer-dryers
- Vacuum cleaners

==== Hitachi Building Systems ====
Hitachi Building Systems is the second largest manufacturer of elevators in Japan.

- Elevators
- Escalators
- Building security systems
- Central air conditioning systems
- Industrial dehumidifiers

==== Hitachi High-Tech ====
- Test and measurement equipment
- Electron microscopes
  - Scanning electron microscopes
    - Field emission scanning electron microscopes (FE-SEM)
  - Transmission electron microscopes
  - Automated material identification and classification systems (AMICS)
  - Other nano-probing systems
- Particle therapy equipment
- Cell culture equipment

=== Subsidiaries and joint ventures ===
==== Astemo ====
Astemo logo

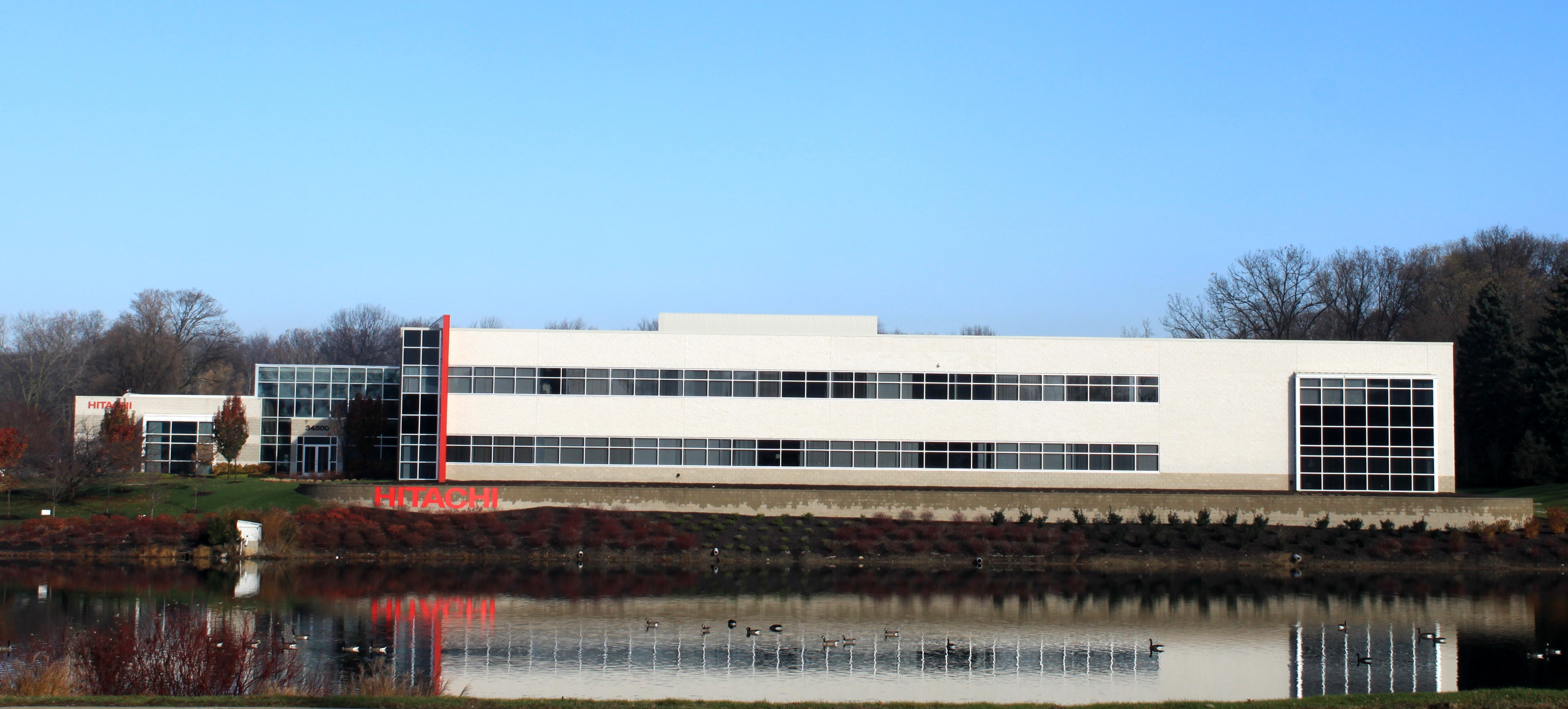
Astemo Americas Offices, Farmington Hills, Michigan

Astemo, which stands for "Advanced Sustainable Technologies for Mobility", is a 40-40-20 joint venture between Hitachi, Honda, and JIC Capital, which is owned by Japan Investment Corporation. Hitachi and Honda their four auto parts affiliates and division, the latter's three keiretsu companies Showa Corporation, Keihin Corporation, and Nissin Kogyo, and the former's wholly owned Hitachi Automotive Systems, to be better equipped for the changing car market environment, frequently represented as CASE, for which they will integrate their assets to accelerate development of new technology and software.

Astemo is considered a "mega supplier", as annual sales of the four predecessors combined stood at $17 billion, placing it as the second largest among the compatriot auto suppliers.

- Car Information Systems
- Drive Control
- Electric Powertrain Systems
- Engine Management Systems

==== Hitachi Construction Machinery ====
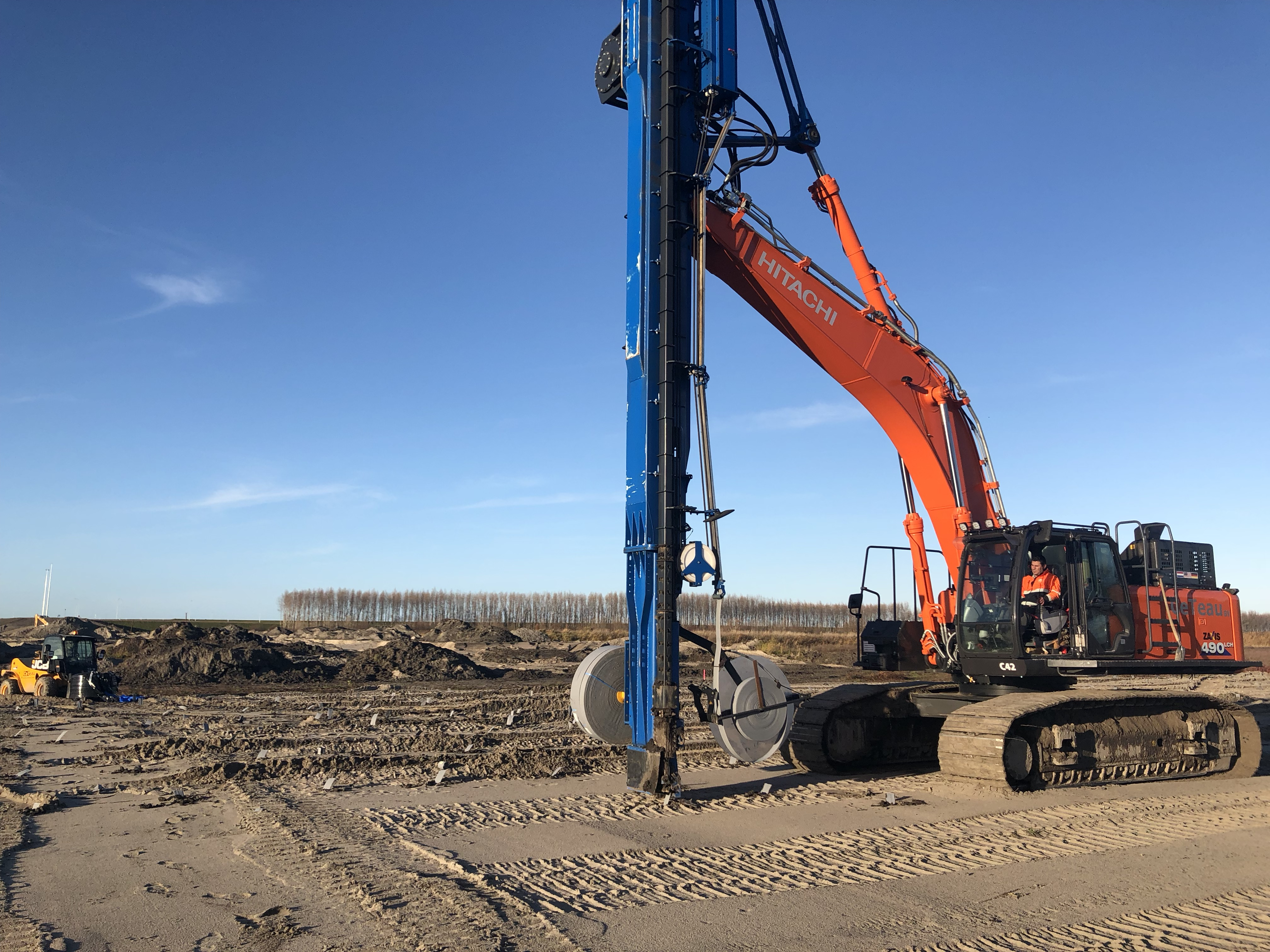
A HITACHI ZX490LCH-6, a 49 ton long-carriage heavy duty excavator driving vertical band drains into the ground.

Hitachi Construction Machinery is one of the world's largest construction equipment manufacturers by revenue. The company was spun off from Hitachi in October 1970 and has been listed on the Tokyo Stock Exchange on its own since 1981. Hitachi owned a 51% share in the company but sold half of its shares to HCIJ Holdings, a joint venture between Itochu and Japan Industrial Partners, in August 2022, leaving Hitachi with 25.4% of the total shares.

- Hydraulic Excavators
- Forestry Equipment
- Mechanical & Hydraulic Cranes
- Mining Dump Trucks
- Crawler Dump trucks
- Wheel Loaders

==== Hitachi MGRM Net ====
On April 9, 2018, Hitachi, Ltd. (TSE:6501) and Hitachi India Pvt. Ltd. announced formation of Hitachi MGRM Net Limited by partnering with MGRM Net Limited (founded 1998) to expand its Social Innovation Business in India using digital technologies.

=== Discontinued or divested businesses ===
==== Hitachi Capital ====
- Leasing
- Loan guarantees
- Invoice finance
- Consumer finance (personal and retail)
- Business finance

Bought by Mitsubishi, it had been the group's financial business arm.

==== Hitachi Metals ====
Among other things, Hitachi Metals supplied materials for aircraft engines and fuselage components (e.g. landing gear), along with finished components for same and other aerospace applications. It also provided materials, components and tools for the automotive and electronics industries. Among the Hitachi Metals facilities was Hitachi Metal Yasugi Works or Tatara Works, one of the oldest furnaces in Japan, famously featured as a main backdrop in Princess Mononoke, a Japanese animation film set in the Muromachi period. Hitachi sold all its shares in Hitachi Metals in 2021, and the company was renamed Proterial in 2023.

==== Hitachi Works ====
Spin-off entities from Hitachi Works include Hitachi Cable (1956) and Hitachi Canadian Industries Limited (founded 1988 in Saskatoon and closed in 2016 as Mitsubishi-Hitachi Power Systems).

As Hitachi pulled out of MHPS and handed over the control to MHI, Hitachi Works was also transferred, becoming part of Mitsubishi Power.

==== Others ====
Other former businesses Hitachi had had include the following:

- Aircraft
  - Hitachi T.2
  - Hitachi TR.2
- Aircraft Engines
  - Hitachi Hatsukaze
- Hitachi Zosen
  - Ships - Business merged with the shipbuilding operation of NKK corporation to form Universal Shipbuilding Corporation
- Displays
  - Plasma and LCD Televisions - Ceased production. Brand name continues to be licensed to Vestel for TVs sold at Argos in the UK.
  - Small LCDs - Divested to be part of Japan Display
  - Projectors - Sold to Maxell
- Memory chips - Spun off to be part of Elpida Memory
- System LSIs - Spun off to be part of Renesas Technology
- Personal computers (Basic Master) - Ceased production
- Mobile phones - Merged with Casio's cellphone manufacturing business, then absorbed into NEC Mobile Communications
- Batteries - Sold to Maxell
- Drilling instruments (Hitachi Via Mechanics) - Sold to The Longreach Group
- Hard disk drives - Separated division for this product line as Hitachi Global Storage Technologies, then HGST was purchased by Western Digital
- Mainframe computer hardware - Stopped exporting in 2000; Ceased production in 2017 to focus on the operating system business.
- Hitachi Kokusai Electric - Sold to KKR
  - Telecommunication equipment
  - Chemical vapor deposition equipment
- Power tools (Hitachi Koki) - Sold to KKR and renamed Hikoki
- Car navigation system (Clarion) - Sold to Faurecia
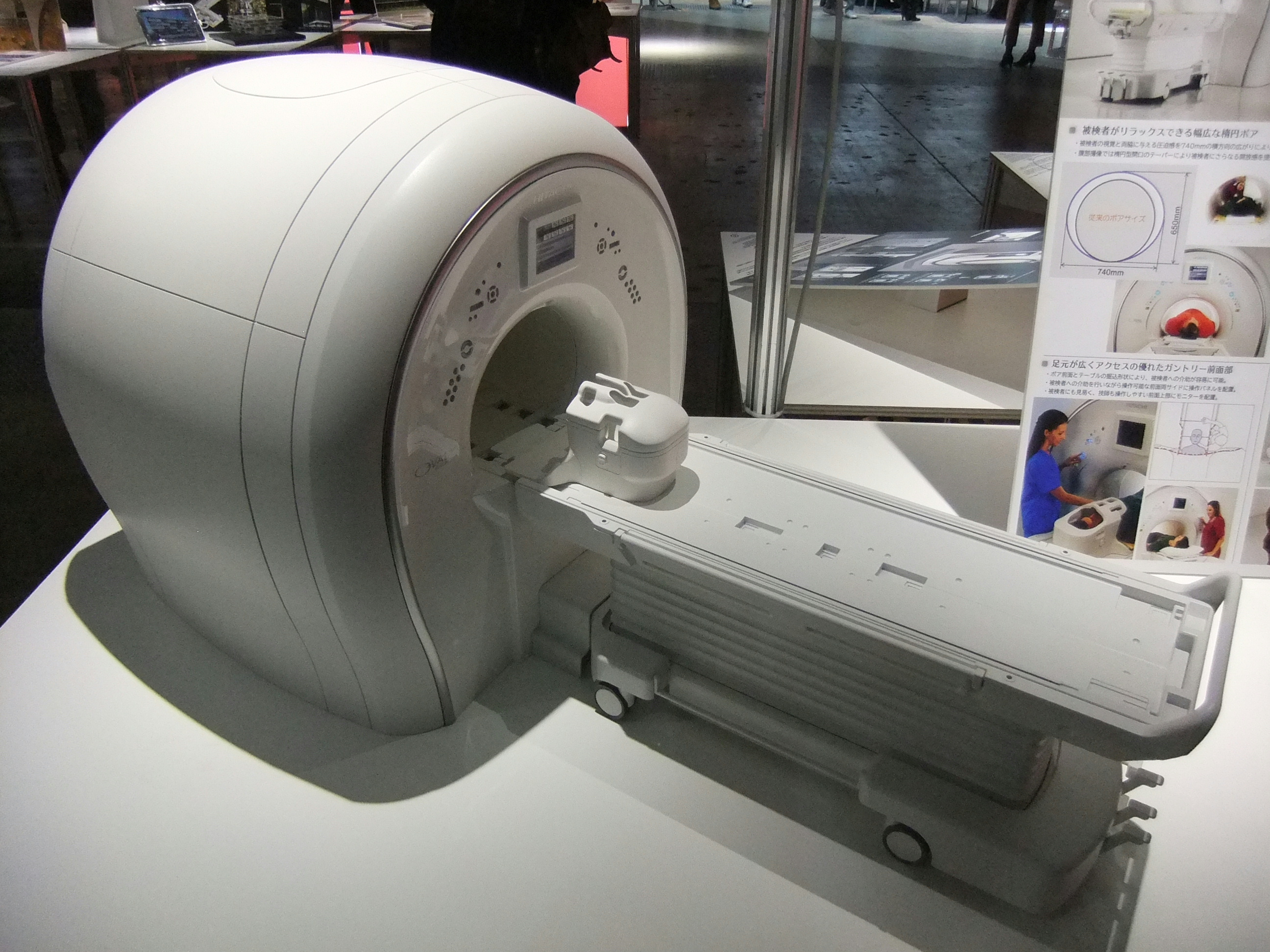
- Hitachi's magnetic resonance imaging equipment
  Wind turbines - Ceased production
- Chemical products (Hitachi Chemical) - Sold to Showa Denko and renamed Showa Denko Materials
- Medical diagnostic equipment - Sold to Fujifilm
- Thermal power generation system (Mitsubishi Hitachi Power Systems) - Shares held by Hitachi transferred to Mitsubishi
- Hitachi Transport System, Ltd. - sold to KKR
- Property management

=== Educational initiatives ===
Hitachi has research partnerships with several universities, and funds research centres within these universities. Hitachi-UTokyo Lab., which is a joint research centre with the Faculty of Engineering, University of Tokyo, focuses on the realisation of data-driven and more efficient society (Former Chairman and UTokyo alumnus Hiroaki Nakanishi coined the term Society 5.0 for this). Hitachi Cambridge Laboratory (HCL), a Hitachi-funded research centre within the University of Cambridge founded in 1985, now focuses on quantum computation and magnetism. Hitachi conducts similar initiatives with Kyoto University, Hokkaido University and National Institute of Advanced Industrial Science and Technology as well.

== See also ==
- ATM Industry Association (ATMIA)
