= Namihei Odaira =

Japanese businessman and philanthropist

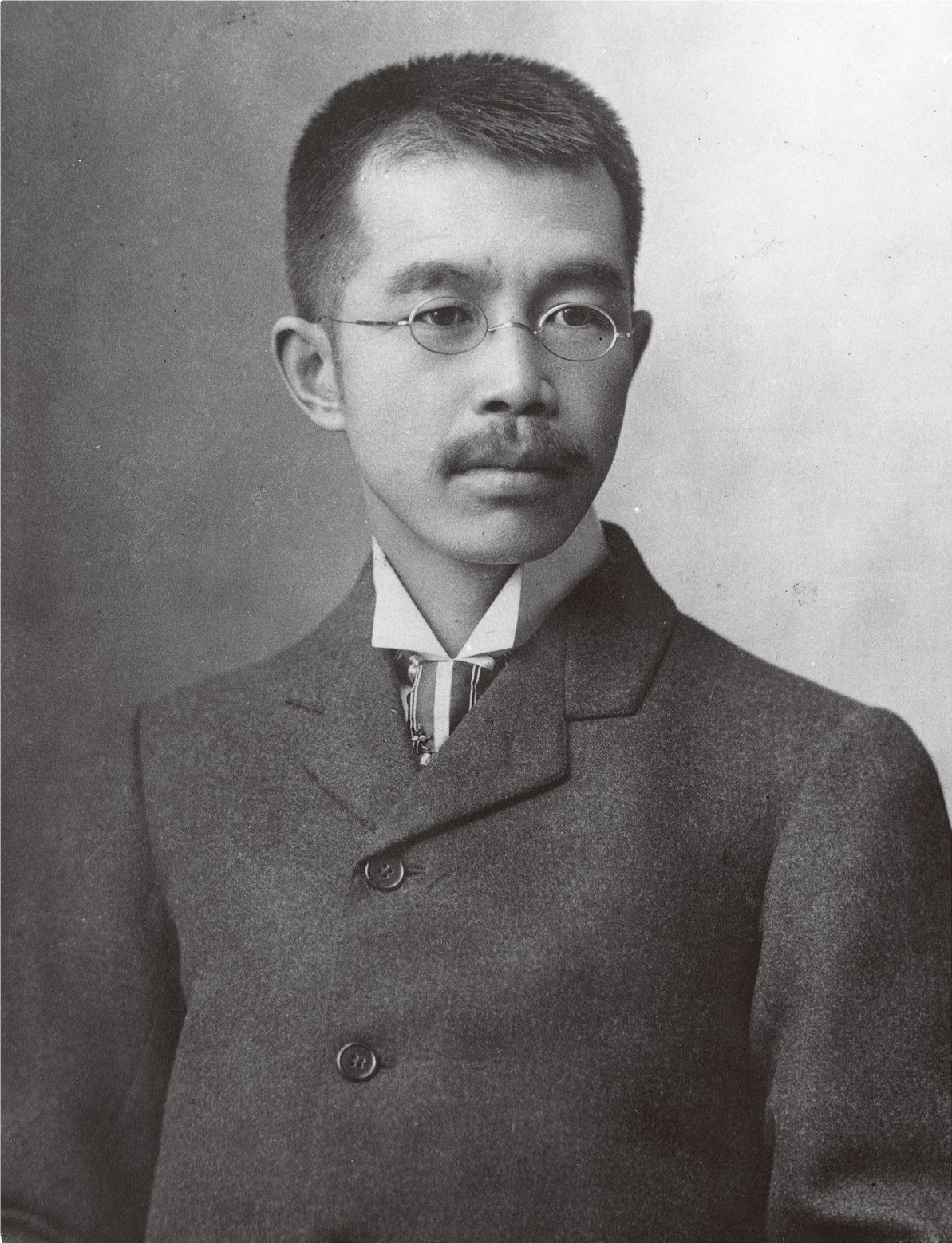
- Odaira, c. 1910
- Born: January 15, 1874; Ienaka, Tochigi, Japan
- Died: October 5, 1951 (aged 77); Tokyo, Japan
- Education: Tokyo Imperial University
- Occupations: Entrepreneur and philanthropist

Namihei Odaira (小平 浪平, Odaira Namihei; January 15, 1874 – October 5, 1951) was a Japanese entrepreneur and philanthropist who founded Hitachi.

== Life ==
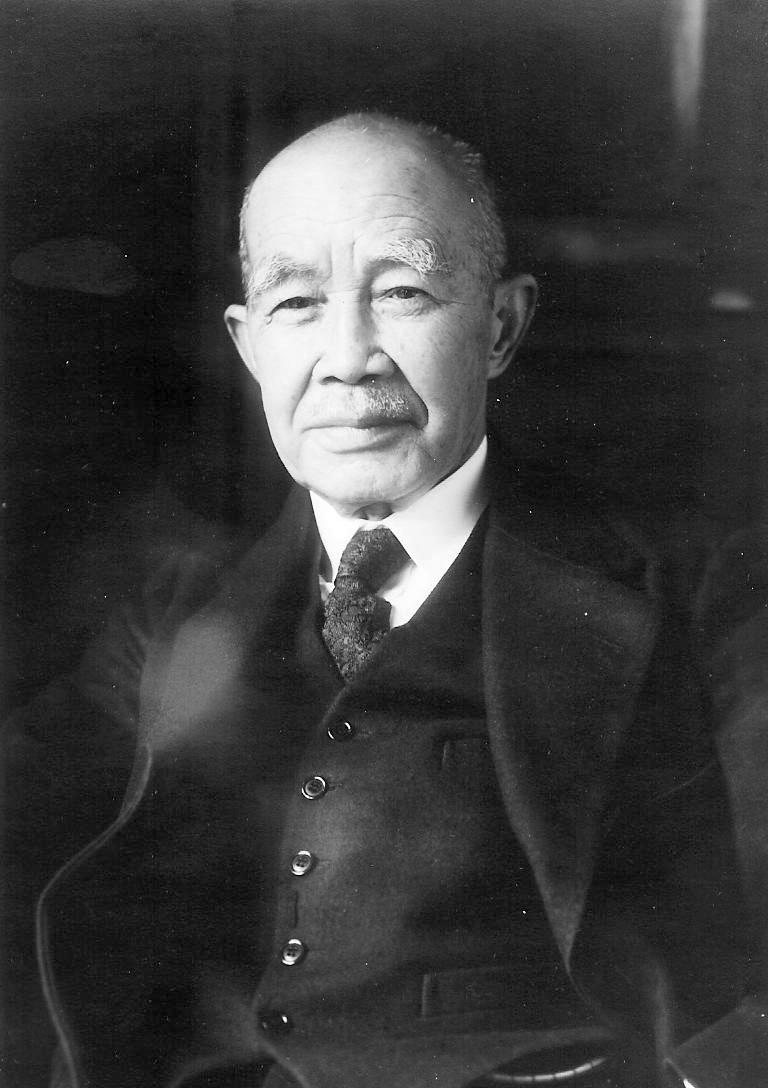
Senior aged Odaira

Odaira was born on January 15, 1874, in Ienaka, Shimotsuga, Tochigi Prefecture (present-day Tsugamachi Kassenba, Tochigi), the second son of Odaira Sōhachi and Chiyo.

In 1900, he graduated from the electrical engineering department of Tokyo Imperial University. Following his graduation, he joined a mining company as an engineer in its power plant. From there, he went on to several electric power companies.

In 1906, he joined the Kuhara Mining Company at its Hitachi copper mine as an engineering section chief. Although his main duties at the mine were to ensure a stable supply of electricity and to maintain the mine's electrical equipment, he and his colleagues began working on the manufacture of a five-horsepower electric motor. This marked the beginning of the development that would become Hitachi, which was founded by Odaira in 1910. However, because it was started as an in-house venture of the Kuhara Mining Company, the owner of Hitachi was Fusanosuke Kuhara, the president of the mining company, not Odaira.

Hitachi Ltd. was incorporated as an independent company in 1920. Odaira acted as the managing director of Hitachi from 1910 to 1929 and the president from 1929 to 1947.

In 1947, Odaira was ordered out of this position by the U.S. occupation authorities. In 1951, this order was lifted, and he returned to the company as chairman emeritus. Almost immediately after his return, he died on October 5, 1951, aged 77.

== See also ==
- Hitachi Works
