= Hitachi TR.1 =

Japanese airliner

TR.1 and TR.2

General information
- Type: Airliner
- National origin: Japan
- Manufacturer: Hitachi
- Number built: 13

History
- First flight: 8 April 1938

The Hitachi TR.1 was a small airliner developed in Japan in 1938, produced in small numbers as the TR.2. It was a low-wing, cantilever monoplane with retractable tailwheel undercarriage and a fully enclosed cabin. The design strongly resembled the Airspeed Envoy that it was intended to replace in Japanese airline service. Testing of the TR.1 prototype commenced on 8 April 1938 at Haneda Airport, but it suffered a serious accident on 22 June due to a landing in which one of the main undercarriage units failed to extend.

The TR.2 was a revised and strengthened design with a larger wing area, and main undercarriage that only semi-retracted. Twelve examples were built in a small series, but performance was not as good as the TR.1, since the modifications to the design had added 260 kg (570 lb) to the aircraft.

== Specifications (TR.1) ==
Data from Japanese Aircraft 1910–1941

General characteristics

- Crew: 2
- Capacity: 6 passengers
- Length: 10.60 m (34 ft 9 in)
- Wingspan: 14.10 m (46 ft 3 in)
- Height: 3.50 m (11 ft 6 in) (to top of radio mast)
- Wing area: 24.5 m^{2} (264 sq ft)
- Empty weight: 1,910 kg (4,211 lb)
- Gross weight: 3,000 kg (6,614 lb)
- Powerplant: 2 × Gasuden Jimpu 5A nine-cylinder air-cooled radial engine, 180 kW (240 hp) each

Performance

- Maximum speed: 303 km/h (188 mph, 163 kn)
- Cruise speed: 251 km/h (156 mph, 136 kn)
- Range: 1,516 km (942 mi, 819 nmi)
- Service ceiling: 4,380 m (14,370 ft)
- Time to altitude: 14 min 47 s to 3,000 m (9,800 ft)
