= List of University of Tokyo people =

This is a list of University of Tokyo (UTokyo) people.

== List of presidents ==
The head of the University of Tokyo is known as the president (総長, socho) and it is a substantive leadership role. The president is elected by the university's board council from among the faculty members for a term of six years.

Presidents of the University of Tokyo
Order	Person	Tenure	Position (involving temporary agent, etc.)
Representation, University of Tokyo
	Hiroyuki Kato	April 13, 1877 (Note: University of Tokyo was founded on April 12, 1877, while the two heads of university administration were appointed the day after the university was founded, April 13, 1877.) - July 5, 1881	
	Kensai Ikeda	April 13, 1877 - July 5, 1881	
	Hiroyuki Kato	July 6, 1881 (Note: It is true that the position of President to oversee the overall operations of the whole University was institutionalized on June 15, 1881, but it is misunderstood to record in the following material that the previous Head, Hiroyuki Kato was on the same day appointed the new position. -) – January 11, 1886	
	Masakazu Toyama	January 11, 1886 – March 1, 1886	Interim
President, Imperial University
	Masakazu Toyama	March 2, 1886 - March 8, 1886	Interim President
1	Hiromoto Watanabe	March 9, 1886 - May 18, 1890	
2	Hiroyuki Kato	May 19, 1890 – March 29, 1893	
3	Arata Hamao	March 30, 1893 - June 18, 1897	
President, Tokyo Imperial University
3	Arata Hamao	June 18, 1897 - November 5, 1897	
4	Masakazu Toyama	November 12, 1897 – April 29, 1998	
5	Dairoku Kikuchi	May 2, 1898 – June 2, 1901	
6	Kenjiro Yamakawa	June 5, 1901 - December 2, 1905	
7	Naokichi Matsui	December 2, 1905 - December 14, 1905	President
8	Arata Hamao	December 14, 1905 - August 13, 1912	Reappointed
	Joji Sakurai	August 13, 1912 – May 9, 1913	Interim President
9	Kenjiro Yamakawa	May 9, 1913 – September 21, 1920	Reappointed
10	Yoshinao Kozai	September 27, 1920 - December 22, 1928	
11	Kiheiji Onozuka	December 22, 1928 – December 27, 1934	
12	Mataro Nagayo	December 27, 1934 - November 8, 1938	
	Kanji Sato	November 8, 1938 – December 20, 1938	Interim President
13	Yuzuru Hiraga	December 20, 1938 – February 17, 1943	
	Kanichi Terazawa	February 17, 1943 – March 12, 1943	Interim President (Note: Due to the death of President Hiraga)
14	Yoshikazu Uchida	March 12, 1943 – December 14, 1945	
15	Shigeru Nambara	December 14, 1945 – May 31, 1949	
President, University of Tokyo (Note: university under the new system of education)
15	Shigeru Nambara	May 31, 1949 - December 14, 1951	
16	Tadao Yanaihara	December 14, 1951 - December 14, 1957	
17	Seiji Kaya	December 14, 1957 – December 13, 1963	
18	Kazuo Okochi	December 14, 1963 – November 5, 1968	
	Ichiro Kato	November 5, 1968 – April 1, 1969	Interim President
19	Ichiro Kato	April 1, 1969 – March 31, 1973	
20	Kentaro Hayashi	April 1, 1973 – March 31, 1977	
21	Takashi Mukaibo	April 1, 1977 – March 31, 1981	
22	Ryuichi Hirano	April 1, 1981 – March 31, 1985	
23	Wataru Mori	April 1, 1985 – March 31, 1989	
24	Akito Arima	April 1, 1989 – March 31, 1993	
25	Hiroyuki Yoshikawa	April 1, 1993 – March 31, 1997	
26	Shigehiko Hasumi	April 1, 1997 – March 31, 2001	
27	Takeshi Sasaki	April 1, 2001 – March 31, 2005	
28	Hiroshi Komiyama	April 1, 2005 – March 31, 2009	
29	Junichi Hamada	April 1, 2009 – March 31, 2015	
30	Makoto Gonokami	April 1, 2015 – March 31, 2021	
31	Teruo Fujii	April 1, 2021 -	

== Notable alumni ==
=== Nobel prize laureates ===
Of UTokyo winners, five have been physicists, one chemists, two for literature, one for physiology or medicine and one for efforts towards peace.

- Shin'ichirō Tomonaga, Physics, 1965
- Yasunari Kawabata, Literature, 1968
- Leo Esaki, Physics, 1973
- Eisaku Satō, Peace, 1974
- Kenzaburō Ōe, Literature, 1994
- Masatoshi Koshiba, Physics, 2002
- Yoichiro Nambu, Physics, 2008
- Ei-ichi Negishi, Chemistry, 2010
- Satoshi Ōmura, Physiology or Medicine, 2015
- Takaaki Kajita, Physics, 2015
- Yoshinori Ohsumi, Physiology or Medicine, 2016
- Syukuro Manabe, Physics, 2021

Shin'ichirō Tomonaga and Satoshi Ōmura have obtained a UTokyo doctorate degree through dissertation review, and considered as UTokyo alumni as well.

=== Prime Ministers ===
- Hara Takashi (1918–1921)
- Katō Takaaki (1924–1926)
- Wakatsuki Reijirō (1926-1927, 1931-1931)
- Osachi Hamaguchi (1929–1931)
- Kōki Hirota (1936–1937)
- Fumimaro Konoe (1937–1939, 1940–1941)
- Hiranuma Kiichirō (1939-1939)
- Kijūrō Shidehara (1945–1946)
- Shigeru Yoshida, (1946–1947, 1948–1954)
- Tetsu Katayama (1947–1948)
- Hitoshi Ashida (1948-1948)
- Ichirō Hatoyama (1954–1956)
- Nobusuke Kishi (1957–1960)
- Eisaku Satō, Nobel laureate (1964–1972)
- Takeo Fukuda (1976–1978)
- Yasuhiro Nakasone (1982–1987)
- Kiichi Miyazawa (1991–1993)
- Yukio Hatoyama (2009–2010)

=== Mathematicians ===
- Tadatoshi Akiba
- Kiyoshi Itō
- Kenkichi Iwasawa
- Tosio Kato
- Kunihiko Kodaira, Fields Medal winner
- Shoshichi Kobayashi
- Mitio Nagumo
- Hidegorō Nakano
- Narutaka Ozawa
- Mikio Sato
- Goro Shimura
- Teiji Takagi
- Yutaka Taniyama
- Kentaro Yano
- Kōsaku Yosida

=== Medical researchers ===
- Akito Arima
- Leo Esaki, Nobel laureate
- Chūshirō Hayashi
- Noriko Kamakura
- Jun Kondo
- Masatoshi Koshiba, Nobel laureate
- Ryogo Kubo
- Moi Meng Ling
- Hantaro Nagaoka
- Ukichiro Nakaya
- Yoichiro Nambu, Nobel laureate
- Yoshio Nishina
- Seiji Ogawa, discoverer of fMRI
- Fumio Takei
- Shohé Tanaka
- Morikazu Toda
- Yoji Totsuka
- Toshifumi Yokota, Fellow of the Canadian Academy of Health Sciences

=== Chemists ===
- Kikunae Ikeda
- Hiroshi Nishihara
- Umetaro Suzuki
- Jōkichi Takamine

=== Physicians ===
- Kunie Miyaji, pioneering woman physician in Japan
- Hajime Sakaki, first professor of psychiatry in Japan
- Kitasato Shibasaburō
- Katsusaburo Yamagiwa
- Madichan Diaz

=== Architects ===
- Arata Isozaki, Royal Gold Medal laureate
- Toyo Ito, Pritzker Prize laureate, Royal Gold Medal laureate
- Kisho Kurokawa, architect
- Fumihiko Maki, Pritzker Prize laureate
- Kenzo Tange, Pritzker Prize laureate
- Yoshikazu Uchida, main architect behind Hongo campus after the Great Kanto earthquake in 1923.
- Kenkichi Yabashi, architect, central figure of the project of constructing National Diet Building as a bureaucrat of Ministry of Finance

=== Authors ===
- Kōbō Abe
- Ryūnosuke Akutagawa
- Sachiya Hiro
- Shinichi Hoshi
- Otohiko Kaga
- Yasunari Kawabata
- Shiki Masaoka
- Shinpei Matsuoka
- Yukio Mishima
- Ōgai Mori
- Dhan Gopal Mukerji
- Kansuke Naka
- Atsushi Nakajima
- Wafu Nishijima
- Kenzaburō Ōe
- Dazai Osamu
- Tatsuhiko Shibusawa
- Naoya Shiga
- Natsume Sōseki
- Jun'ichirō Tanizaki
- Kunio Yanagita

=== Entertainers ===
- Toshiya Fujita, film director
- Bai Guang, one of the seven great singing stars of China
- Teruyuki Kagawa, actor
- Tokiko Kato, singer
- Rei Kikukawa, actress
- Tamayo Marukawa, TV announcer
- Towa Oshima, manga artist
- Kenji Ozawa, musician
- Nam June Paik, video artist
- Koichi Sugiyama, music composer
- Isao Takahata, anime director
- Mayuko Takata, actress
- Kiyohiko Ushihara, film director
- Yoji Yamada, film director
- Yoshishige Yoshida, film director
- Anton Wicky, educator
- Takushi Izawa, TV personality and YouTuber (QuizKnock)

=== Others ===
- Anirban Mondal, Computer Scientist
- Tadatoshi Akiba, Mayor of Hiroshima
- Naohiro Amaya, head of the Ministry of International Trade and Industry (MITI)
- Inokuchi Ariya, founder of Ebara Corporation
- Fang Chih, Statesman, 1923
- Toshihiko Fukui, Governor of the Bank of Japan
- Furuichi Kōi, civil engineer
- Yoshimi Goda, Coastal Engineer and recipient of the Order of the Sacred Treasure
- Minoru Harada, Buddhist leader, 6th President of Soka Gakkai
- Mantarō Hashimoto, linguist and sinologist
- Keizō Hayashi, General officer, first Chairman of the Joint Staff Council since Japan Self-Defense Forces' establishment
- Hirata Tosuke, Japanese statesman and Lord Keeper of the Privy Seal of Japan, active in the Meiji and Taishō period Empire of Japan
- Toshizō Ido, Japanese politician, 52nd Governor of Hyōgo Prefecture
- Kimie Iwata, businesswoman and government official
- Kanō Jigorō, creator of judo
- Takashi Kawamura, 9th President of Hitachi
- Kiryū Yūyū, journalist and anti-war activist
- Akihiko Kumashiro, politician, three-time member of the House of Representatives of Japan
- Susumu Kuno, linguist, Professor Emeritus at Harvard University
- Kiyozawa Manshi, Buddhist thinker
- Peng Ming-min, DPP Senior Advisor to President Chen Shui-Bian; former president of WUFI
- Shinrokuro Miyoshi
- Tsunetaro Moriyama, Hall of Fame baseball pitcher
- Toshirō Mutō, Deputy Governor of the Bank of Japan
- Makoto Nakajima, former Commissioner of the Japan Patent Office
- Yoshiro Nakamatsu, inventor
- Hiroaki Nakanishi (MS 1979), President of Hitachi
- John Nathan, translator, first American admitted as a regular student
- Kitaro Nishida, philosopher
- Namihei Odaira, entrepreneur and philanthropist, founder of Hitachi
- Masaharu Ōhashi, Justice of the Supreme Court of Japan
- Ong Iok-tek, linguist
- Hisashi Owada, International Court of Justice Judge
- Masako Owada, Crown Princess of Japan
- Toshiki Sumitani, President, Kobe Institute of Computing
- Daisetz Teitaro Suzuki, Buddhist scholar
- Hayato Sumino, pianist
- Makoto Soejima, competitive programmer
- Shigeaki Sugeta, linguist
- Takejirō Tokonami, government minister and governor
- Eiji Toyoda, industrialist
- Kazuo Ueda, Yiddishist
- Kazuhide Uekusa, economist
- Hidesaburō Ueno, agricultural scientist and owner of world's most loyal dog, Hachiko
- Yoichi Wada, president of Square Enix
- Tetsurō Watsuji, philosopher
- Charles Dickinson West, mechanical engineer
- Akira Yanabu, researcher in translation and comparative literature
- Katsuo Yakura, member of the House of Councillors for Saitama Prefecture
- Hakuo Yanagisawa, politician, Minister of Health, Labour and Welfare
- Takashi Yuasa, lawyer, economist
