= List of Kyoto University people =

This is a list of people associated with Kyoto University in Japan. Several notable individuals have either studied or worked on the faculty of Kyoto University.

== Nobel laureates ==
- Hideki Yukawa - winner of the Nobel Prize in Physics in 1949; first Japanese to win the Nobel Prize
- Shinichiro Tomonaga - winner of the Nobel Prize in Physics in 1965
- Kenichi Fukui - winner of the Nobel Prize in Chemistry in 1981
- Susumu Tonegawa - winner of the Nobel Prize in Physiology or Medicine in 1987
- Ryōji Noyori - winner of the Nobel Prize in Chemistry in 2001
- Makoto Kobayashi - winner of the Nobel Prize in Physics in 2008
- Toshihide Masukawa - winner of the Nobel Prize in Physics in 2008
- Shinya Yamanaka - winner of the Nobel Prize in Physiology or Medicine in 2012
- Isamu Akasaki - winner of the Nobel Prize in Physics in 2014
- Tasuku Honjo - winner of the Nobel Prize in Physiology or Medicine in 2018
- Akira Yoshino - winner of the Nobel Prize in Chemistry in 2019

== Fields Medalists ==
- Heisuke Hironaka - mathematician, Fields Medalist in 1970
- Shigefumi Mori - mathematician, Fields Medalist in 1990

== Literature ==
- Keiichiro Hirano
- Yasushi Inoue
- Motojirō Kajii
- Kan Kikuchi - author
- Akiko Kiso - classical scholar
- Sakyo Komatsu
- Tatsuji Miyoshi
- Shohei Ooka
- Akimitsu Takagi - crime fiction writer

== Politicians ==
- Osachi Hamaguchi - Prime Minister of Japan
- Frank Hsieh (aka Hsieh Chang-Ting) - former mayor of Kaohsiung City and Premier of Taiwan; 2008 Democratic Progressive Party presidential candidate for the Republic of China (Taiwan)
- Hayato Ikeda - Prime Minister of Japan
- Tetsu Katayama - Prime Minister of Japan
- Fumimaro Konoe - Prime Minister of Japan
- Tadahiro Matsushita - five-time member of the House of Representatives of Japan
- Peng Ming-min - Taiwan's DPP candidate for the 1996 Taiwan presidential elections
- Kijuro Shidehara - Prime Minister of Japan
- Lee Teng-hui - former President of the Republic of China (Taiwan)
- Mai Ohara – Japanese Representative from Kyoto 5th electoral district (DPJ, 2009–12)

== Science ==
- Yasunori Hayashi - neuroscientist
- Kinji Imanishi - ecologist, anthropologist
- Shirō Ishii, microbiologist, army medical officer
- Kiyosi Itô - mathematician
- Takura Izumi - archaeologist
- Motoo Kimura - biologist
- Radenka Maric - materials science and engineering, 17th president of the University of Connecticut (2022– )
- Ushitaro Matsuura - dermatologist
- Tetsuro Matsuzawa - primatologist
- Makoto Nagao - computer scientist; 21st president of Kyoto University
- Yasutomi Nishizuka - biochemist
- Kiyoshi Oka - mathematician
- Atsuhiro Osuka - chemist
- Kento Sasano - sustainability scientist, social entrepreneur
- Ri Sung-gi - North Korean chemist; inventor of Vinalon
- Teiji Takagi - mathematician
- Takao Umemoto- psychology
- Shinya Yamanaka - physician
- Toshiko Yuasa - nuclear physicist, the first Japanese female physicist
- Masahito Hayashi - Quantum information theory

== Other ==
- Diwakar Acharya - Nepali scholar of South Asia
- Umeda Mikio - agricultural roboticist and Asian agricultural development's strategist
- Akira Asada - philosopher
- Takeo Kanade - roboticist and one of the world's foremost researchers in computer vision
- Kazoh Kitamori
- Junya Kondo - founder of Hatena Co., Ltd.
- Kiyoshi Miki - philosopher
- Michio Morishima - economist
- Ayappanpillai Madhavan Nair - revolutionary of Indian Independence
- Masakazu Nakai - philosopher, activist, librarian
- Nagisa Oshima - film director
- Ito Sekisui V - potter
- Tetsuji Takechi - kabuki and film director and author
- Takeshi Umehara - philosopher
- Akira Yamada - philosopher
- Takahisa Zeze - film director
- Fengbo Zhang - Chinese economist

== See also ==
- List of Nobel laureates affiliated with Kyoto University
- Category:Kyoto University alumni
- Category:Academic staff of Kyoto University
