= Kunie =

- Gender: Both

Origin
- Origin: Japanese
- Meaning: Different meanings depending on the kanji used

Other names
- Alternative spelling: Kunié

Kunie (written: 邦衛, 邦恵, 邦枝 or 久仁衛), sometimes transliterated as Kunié, is a unisex Japanese given name. Notable people with the name include:

- Kunie Miyaji (born 1891), Japanese pioneering woman physician
- Kunie Iwahashi (岩橋 邦枝; 1934–2014), Japanese writer
- Kunie Kitamoto (北本 久仁衛; born 1981), Japanese footballer
- Kunie Shishikura (宍倉 邦枝; born 1946), Japanese volleyball player
- Kunié Sugiura (杉浦 邦恵; born 1942), Japanese photographer
- Kunie Tanaka (田中 邦衛; born 1932), Japanese actor
