= Takashi Kawamura =

Takashi Kawamura may refer to:

- Takashi Kawamura (The Prince of Tennis), fictional character in the anime and manga The Prince of Tennis
- Takashi Kawamura (politician) (born 1948), Japanese politician
- Takashi Kawamura (businessman) (born 1939), current Chairman and former President of Hitachi
