= Umemoto =

Umemoto (written: 梅本) is a Japanese surname. Notable people with the surname include:

- Elyse Umemoto (born 1984), American beauty pageant winner, dance team manager and television personality
- Ryu Umemoto (梅本 竜, 1974–2011), Japanese video game composer
- Takao Umemoto (梅本 堯夫, 1921-2002), Japanese psychologist
