= Shiinoki Cultural Complex =

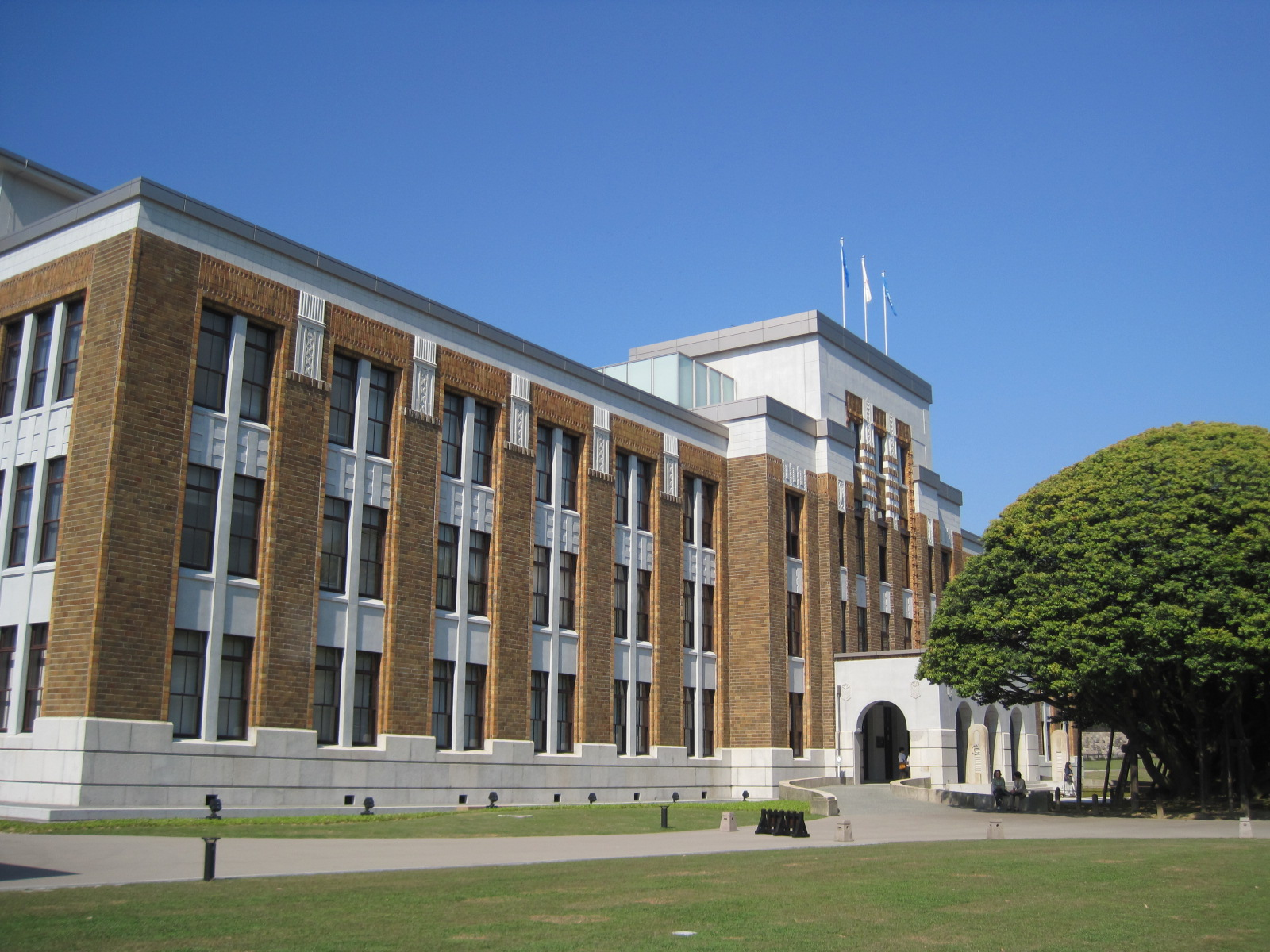
Shiinoki Cultural Complex

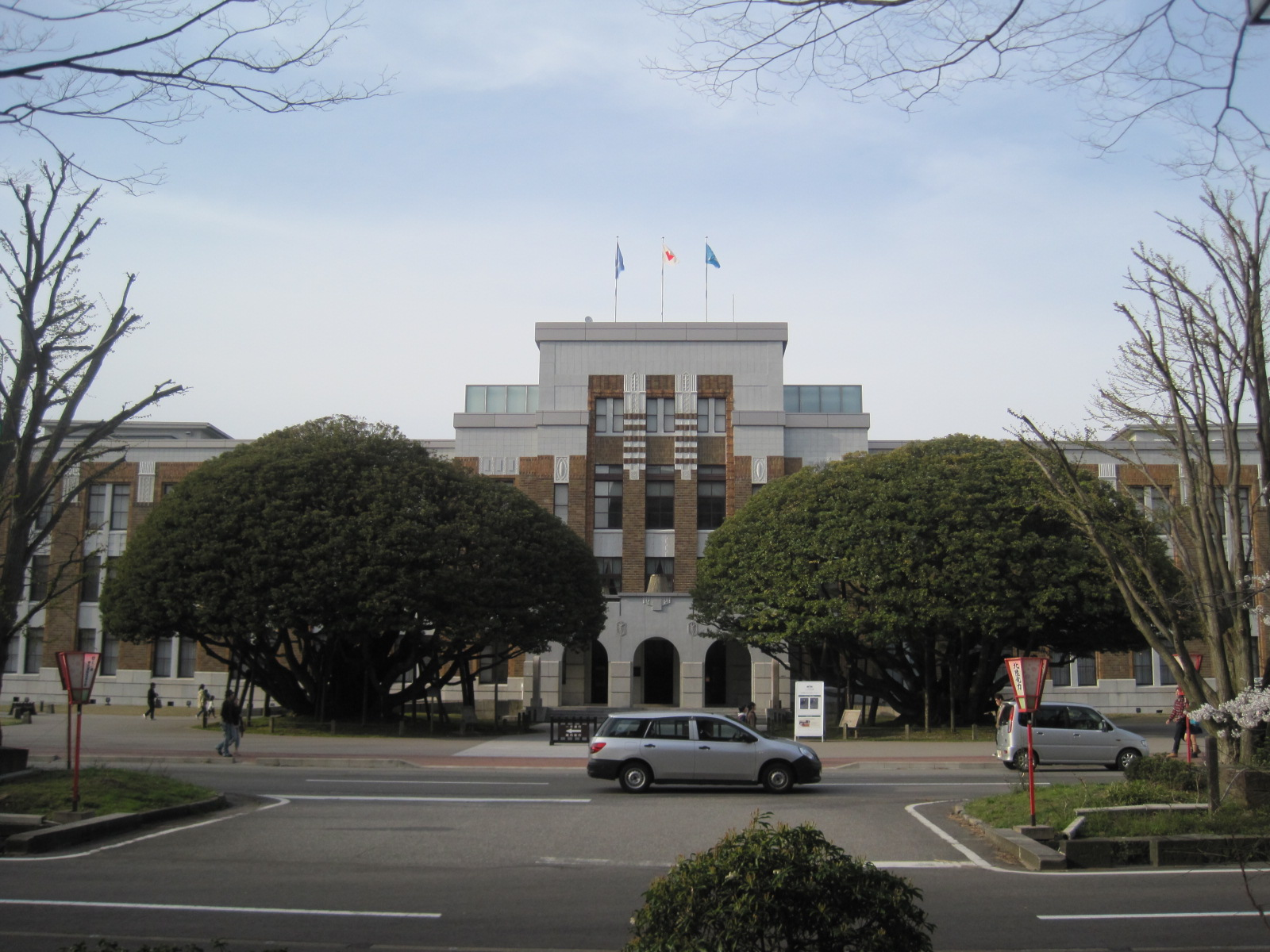
Front view showing Japanese chinquapin trees

Shiinoki Cultural Complex is in Kanazawa, Japan. It is housed in the former Ishikawa Prefectural Government Building, which was completed in 1924 and designed by architect Kenkichi Yabashi (1869–1927). It is located at 920-0962 Ishikawa, Kanazawa, Hirosaka, 2 Chome−1−1 on the south side of Kanazawa Castle Park.

It is the first building in Ishikawa Prefecture to adopt a reinforced concrete structure, and the oldest prefectural government building with a reinforced concrete structure in Japan.

Two dome-shaped Japanese chinquapin trees stand in front of the building, which are estimated to be 400 years old.

The building survived the U.S. air raids of World War II.

On June 24, 2021, it was registered as a tangible cultural property (buildings).
