= Singularity studies =

Field of Research

Singularity studies is an interdisciplinary academic field which examines the idea of technological singularity — the hypothesised point at which artificial intelligence may surpass human intelligence, might be attained by artificial intelligence (AI), robotics, and other technologies and sciences, and its social impacts.

In this academic field, the study and research are conducted across a broad array of terrains such as information science, robotics, social informatics, economics, philosophy, and ethics. The primary aim of singularity studies is to gain an integrative understanding of the transformation of social systems occurring in tandem with the explosive evolution of AI and also the changes to be affected by such transformation in the view of humans, ethics, and legal systems.

== History ==
An academic work on technological singularity has appeared in computer science, philosophy, sociology, and law since the early 1990s.

Early discussions of an intelligence explosion were popularised by science-fiction writer Vernor Vinge in 1993 and later systematised by futurist Ray Kurzweil. Since the 2010s, universities such as Oxford, Stanford, and Keio have established dedicated programmes, while peer-reviewed journals have begun to publish scenario analyses and policy studies. Ongoing debates question the predictive value of singularity scenarios and warn against a deterministic view of technology.

== Characteristics of research ==
Singularity studies extends beyond mere future predictions and offer an intellectual foundation for proactively designing and creating a desirable future. Principal research themes in this realm include:

- Ethics of AI;
- Social implications of technologies;
- Possibility of harmonious coexistence of humans and AI;
- Communication with AI; and
- Redesign of social systems.

== Technologists and academics ==
- Vernor Vinge: Propounded the concept of singularity in 1993, making a massive impact on the academic and science-fiction spheres.
- Ray Kurzweil: Predicted the advent around 2045 of the technological singularity in his 2005 book The Singularity Is Near.
- Nick Bostrom: Offered philosophical reflections on superintelligence and the risks posed by AI. He is the founding director of the now-dissolved Future of Humanity Institute at the University of Oxford.

=== Japan ===
- Kento Sasano: A social informatician, AI educator, and inventor. He is the president of the Japan Society of Singularity Studies.

== Challenges and outlook ==
Singularity studies is still new as an academic field, and various a few challenges remain unresolved in regard to the systematization of their theories, research methods, and educational curricula. That said, as a result of accelerating technological and societal shifts, interdisciplinary approaches are becoming more common and are bringing attention in the areas of scholarly research, intercorporate collaboration, and policy planning.

== See also ==
- Artificial general intelligence – Type of AI with wide-ranging abilities
- Futures studies – Study of postulating possible futures
- Singularitarianism – Belief in an incipient technological singularity
- Superintelligence – Hypothetical agent surpassing human intelligence
