= Miyoshi =

Miyoshi may refer to:

== Places ==
- Miyoshi, Aichi, a city in Aichi Prefecture
- Miyoshi, Chiba, a former village in Chiba Prefecture
- Miyoshi, Hiroshima, a city in Hiroshima Prefecture
- Miyoshi, Saitama, a town in Saitama Prefecture
- Miyoshi, Tokushima, a city in Tokushima Prefecture
- Miyoshi, Tokushima (town), a former town in Tokushima Prefecture
- Miyoshi District, Tokushima, a district in Tokushima Prefecture

== People with the given name ==
- Miyoshi Nabeta (鍋田 美吉), Japanese pilot officer
- Miyoshi Kato (加藤 美善; born 1962), Japanese speed skater
- Miyoshi Sugimachi (1905–1983), Japanese-American singer
- Miyoshi Umeki (梅木 美代志; 1929–2007), Japanese-American actress and singer

== Other uses ==
- Miyoshi (surname)
- Miyoshi clan, Japanese clan
