= Kento Sasano =

Japanese Socio-Informatics scientist and sustainability scientist and inventor

- 笹埜 健斗
- Born: 1994; Okayama, Japan
- Education: Kyoto University; University of Tokyo
- Known for: Teach-to-AI; Copal; MIBO
- Awards: Sakurai Tokutaro Awards Excellent Award for high school student :joint recipient (2010 fiscal year), International Philosophy Olympiad Gold award in Japan (2011), Keio SFC Academic Society Encouragement Award (2024)
- Scientific career
- Fields: Informatics; Experience design using generative AI
- Workplaces: Okayama University; Keio Research Institute at SFC, Keio University
- Website: sasano.org

Kento Sasano (笹埜 健斗, Kento Sasano; born 1994) is a Japanese information scientist, inventor, and entrepreneur. His work focuses on designing new experiences using generative artificial intelligence.

As of 2026, Sasano is a specially appointed professor at Okayama University, appointed for university-industry collaboration in the Faculty of Environmental, Life, Natural Science and Technology and a senior researcher at the Keio Research Institute at SFC, Keio University.

Specialized in educational DX using generative AI (GenAI) and in SX: Sustainability Transformation, Sasano is known for his studies and development on the sustainability of IoMT security, to enhance information governance and information security.

His SDGs/ESG data science research for the realization of a sustainable society, including sustainable management, incorporated Human capital management. He has also contributed to the developing technology of Prompt engineering to apply AI and ChatGPT as one of the leading experts in Sustainability Science in Japan.

Sasano currently conducts joint research on the educational programs of AI co-creation and runs a Facebook group for the network of adopting DX high schools for the purpose of disseminating information and exchanging opinions on educational DX.

Sasano's research and teaching have been addressing digital transformation in education and has proposed Teach-to-AI, an approach in which students learn by teaching an AI agent, and introduced it into public high schools through the Copal learning bot. Sasano also established MIBO to track the information behavior of generative AI services.

== Early life and career ==
Sasano was born in Okayama, Japan in 1994. While in Okayama Sozan High School in 2011, he won a Gold award in the Japanese selection round for the International Philosophy Olympiad. He represented Japan at the international event in Vienna that year.

Sasano graduated from Kyoto University after being major in Law and earned a master’s degree in socio-information and communication studies at the University of Tokyo. Sasano and his collegues founded Scrumy Inc. in April 2021 and he serves as its representative director. In 2024, Sasano founded the Japan Society of Singularity Studies and became its president. He also chairs the Japan Education DX Promotion Association.

== Research ==
=== Generative AI and learning ===
Sasano proposes Teach-to-AI, an approach to learning by teaching an AI agent, and the T.E.A.C.H. framework for classroom use. Learners organize what to teach, explain it to the AI, respond to its questions, check and correct its responses, and refine their explanations. The AI is designed as an imperfect learner to help students identify gaps in their own understanding. His research also examines high school students’ agency in learning through Teach-to-AI.

He uses “co-evolutionary scaffolding” to describe an ongoing relationship in which dialogue with AI changes learners’ understanding and the way they engage with it.

Sasano has proposed “Nurturable Agents”: AI agents that learners develop, evaluate, and revise over time. The approach extends learning by teaching into “Learning by Nurturing”, in which an agent retains learners’ changes and becomes a lasting product of their learning.

=== Information behavior of generative AI ===
MIBO (Machine Information Behavioral Observatory) tracks the information behavior of publicly available generative AI services over time. It repeatedly records responses to a fixed set of questions to examine differences between services and changes in their use of sources and citations.

He has also proposed MIBO-Education, a framework for tracking changes in AI responses across 70 educational scenarios. It addresses issues such as learner agency and assessment, with the aim of observing how services offered under the same name change their educational behavior over time.

=== Information security and corporate reporting ===
In 2022, Sasano contributed articles to Gekkan Shin Iryo and the Journal of Internet of Medical Things on cybersecurity in healthcare information systems and legal policy concerning the security of connected medical devices.

He developed a system using generative AI to address defamatory content on social media and presented it at a Keio SFC Academic Society meeting in November 2023. A related Japanese patent application was published in June 2025 as JP 2025-085504 A.

He serves as co-chair of the XBRL Asia Round Table. On 10 July 2026, he co-presented a framework for trust in AI-mediated corporate reporting at XART 2026. Its three layers address data authenticity and provenance, the security of AI processing and outputs, and the social effects of their use.

=== Inventions ===
He is the inventor and patent holder of Japanese Patent No. 7839520, which concerns an information-processing system that matches images from a user’s field of view with location-related images to provide relevant information.

=== Digital transformation in sport ===
In April 2026, the Japan Education DX Promotion Association announced the establishment of Pickleball Soken, a pickleball research initiative led by Sasano. Its stated research agenda included models for measuring changes in physical activity, dialogue and well-being using questionnaires, video, activity logs and dialogue data.

== Education ==
=== Digital transformation in education ===
Sasano has introduced learning by teaching AI into public high schools through the Copal learning bot and the Japanese education ministry’s DX High School initiative.

On 9 July 2024, Sasano led activities in information gathering and data analysis using generative AI at an inquiry-learning ideathon at Okayama Prefectural Seto High School. The activities used the FRTC cycle, developed with the school, to incorporate government statistics and other data into student inquiry. Its four stages concern identifying a problem, collecting information, thinking and communicating.

The October 2024 issue of the education magazine View next described this work and the development of FRTC into FRATC. According to the magazine, observing students persist in seeking cooperation for their projects led Sasano to add “A” for “Act”. He also developed prompts for using generative AI at different stages of inquiry.

He has also been involved in establishing and organizing Generative AI Koshien, a student competition using generative AI.

He describes teachers as “ecosystem designers” who shape learning environments connecting students with AI, learning materials, and other people through inquiry and dialogue.

=== Digital transformation in sport ===
On 13 and 21 September 2026, he taught introductory sessions on AI and digital transformation in sports education at AI-based pickleball assessment events.

== Views ==
=== Realism of vulnerability ===
Sasano proposes a “realism of vulnerability” (Japanese:弱さのリアリズム), an approach to designing institutions and technologies around human cognitive, social, and emotional vulnerability. It seeks to protect people while recognizing these vulnerabilities as part of being human. His proposals include “ProTech”, which introduces protective friction such as cooling-off periods, and a “second social contract” entrusting protective functions to auditing AI.

He uses “GoTech” to describe practices for recording and living with one’s vulnerabilities. He has also proposed protected spaces for activities such as art and walking to remain outside AI-driven optimization.

=== Homo symbiosis ===
Sasano discusses human–AI co-evolution under the concept of “Homo symbiosis” (Japanese:ホモ・シンビオシス). In a May 2026 lecture hosted by the Japan Society for Research Policy and Innovation Management, he applied this perspective to who carries out research and creative work and how research is organized.

A lecture report by the editors of Rinen to Keiei described his view of AI as an “Exo-Brain” extending human intelligence beyond the body. It also reported his use of hare and ke to contrast polished texts with everyday, embodied experience and its contradictions, raising questions about what AI training data leaves out.

=== Views on the singularity ===
He describes singularity studies as an approach that considers present social problems and institutions from the perspective of a future technological turning point. He has proposed using dialogue with AI to identify needs that people find difficult to articulate and to inform policy. In a 2025 essay, he argued that the singularity had already arrived, emphasizing AI’s spread as a protocol shaping society’s information environment.

=== The third brain ===
Sasano describes AI as a “third brain” that supports thinking, learning, personal development, and participation in society. His stated aim at Kento Sasano Lab is to research, develop, and test AI that supports human judgment and agency.

=== Well-being ===
According to the editors of Rinen to Keiei, in a December 2025 lecture he advocated attention to gross domestic well-being (GDW) and the use of AI to improve human well-being.

== Praises and Awards ==
=== Personal and joint awards ===
He jointly received an Excellent award in the high-school student division of the ninth Sakurai Tokutaro Award for the 2010 fiscal year, for research on the persistence of Fuju-fuse religious practice in Seto, Okayama Prefecture.

In 2011, he won a Gold award in the Japanese qualifying competition for the 19th International Philosophy Olympiad.

On 23 November 2024, he won an Encouragement award at the 24th meeting of the Keio SFC Academic Society for “AI Co-creation Education: Practice and Progress in DX High Schools”.

=== Awards to Scrumy ===
Scrumy, which he leads, received the Audience Award at the fourth G-STARTUP Demo Day on 4 April 2022.

On 16 January 2023, Scrumy received the Sumitomo Mitsui Banking Corporation GREEN×GLOBE Partners Award at Mirai X 2023.

== Media ==
In January 2025, Nikkei Business interviewed Sasano about partnerships between humans and AI, introducing him as president of the Japan Society of Singularity Studies.

His television appearances include the 4 February 2026 episode of Honma Dekka!? TV, a special on changes in learning in the Reiwa era.

== Publications ==
He had a few appearances in media, such as the radio program "Evening Stream" on FM Chubee in 2019, CNA TV program "Click To Ransom" in 2022, and more. He explained his papers and comments with contribution in interviews by FRIDAY DIGITAL, a Japanese Internat media from Kōdansha.

He lectured on Scrumy Media's movie series "SDGs Hakunetsu Kyōshitsu" for students and workers.

== See also ==
- List of Kyoto University people
- List of University of Tokyo people
