= Anton Wicky =

Sri Lankan educator (born 1936)

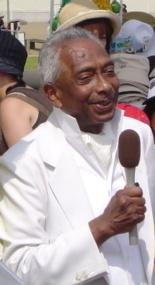
Anton Wicky in August 2005

Anton Wicky (アントン・ウィッキー) (born September 26, 1936) is an educator and celebrity in Japan. His full name is Anton Wicky Ampalavanar. He was born in Ceylon and went to Japan in 1961 as a Mombusho scholar. In 1969 he earned a doctorate from the University of Tokyo. His teaching career has included Ohu and Reitaku Universities.

He began his Nippon Television show Wicky-san's One-point English Conversation in 1979. It ran for fifteen years. The show began again in 2007.

Since 2006, Wicky has appeared in commercials for Yellow Hat, a chain of automotive-supply retail stores.
