= Umeda Mikio =

Japanese agricultural inventor and scientist

Mikio Umeda
- 梅田 幹雄 うめだ みきお
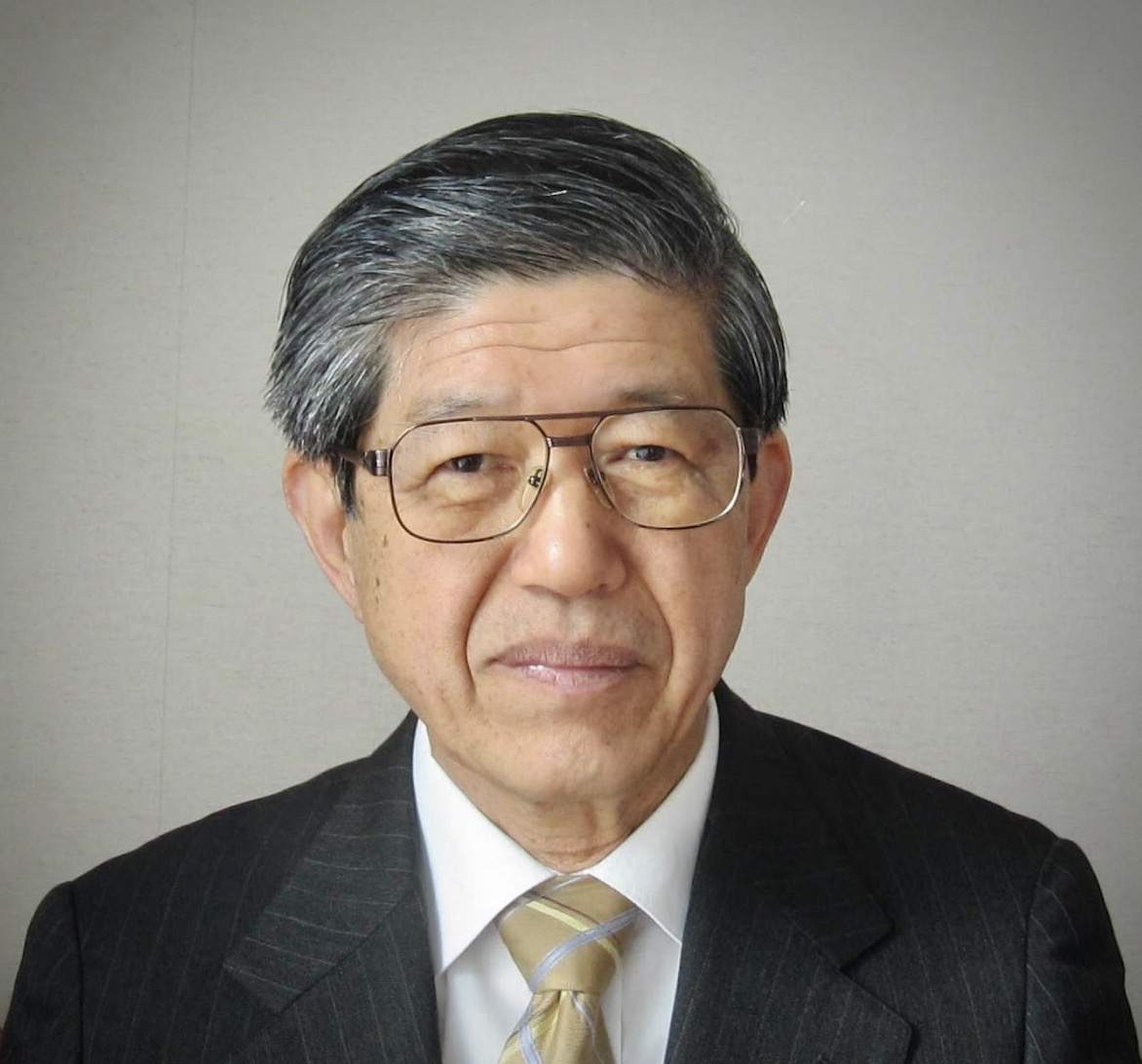
- Umeda in 2019
- Born: 27 November 1945 (age 80); Kyoto, Japan
- Education: Kyoto University (BS, MS, PhD); University of Hohenheim
- Alma mater: Kyoto University
- Known for: Agricultural Robots; Precision Agriculture
- Awards: List of Awards: Academic Award of the Japanese Society of Agricultural Machinery (1993); Excellent Honorary Foreign Scientist of the Rural Development Administration of the Republic of Korea (2004); Paper Award of the Crop Science Society of Japan (2005); Fellow of Japan Association of International Commission of Agriculture And Biosystems Engineering (2011)
- Scientific career
- Fields: Smart farming Field robotics Agricultural robotics
- Workplaces: Kyoto University

Mikio Umeda (梅田 幹雄, UMEDA Mikio; born November 27, 1945) is a Japanese inventor and scientist in the fields of precision agriculture, field robotics and agricultural robot. He is also one of leading international experts in agricultural development strategies in Asia. He is currently serving as Professor emeritus of Kyoto University, Associate Council Member of the Science Council of Japan and Honorary President of CIGR.

== Early life and education ==
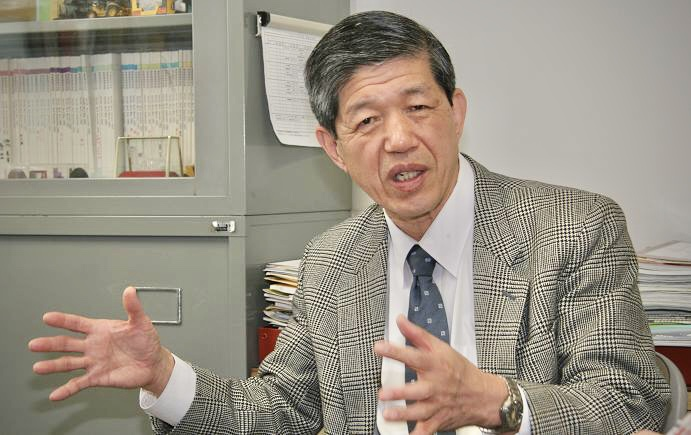
Mikio UMEDA in his office at Kyoto University (2009)

Umeda was born in Kyoto, Japan, on 27 November 1945. He earned a B.S. in 1968 and an M.S. degree in 1970, both in Agricultural Engineering from Faculty and Graduate School of Agriculture of Kyoto University, and a Dr. Eng. degree in Agricultural Science, also from Kyoto University in 1992. He served as a Visiting Researcher at University of Hohenheim, Stuttgart, Germany in 1994. He has been recognised fully Professor of Kyoto University since 1997, and served as the Head of Laboratory of Field Robotics, Graduate School of Agriculture since then.

Prof. Dr. Mikio Umeda retired Professorship of Field Robotics from Division of Environmental Science and Technology, Graduate School of Agriculture, Kyoto University in March 2009. He became Professor of Kyoto University Career Support Center between May 2009 and March 2014. Since 2014 he has been Secretary General of CIGR, and became its Honorary President since 2018. He frequently gives keynote speeches, presentations and lectures about smart farming and agricultural development at many universities and institutions across Asia and the world, as well as releases many publications.

== Research and career ==
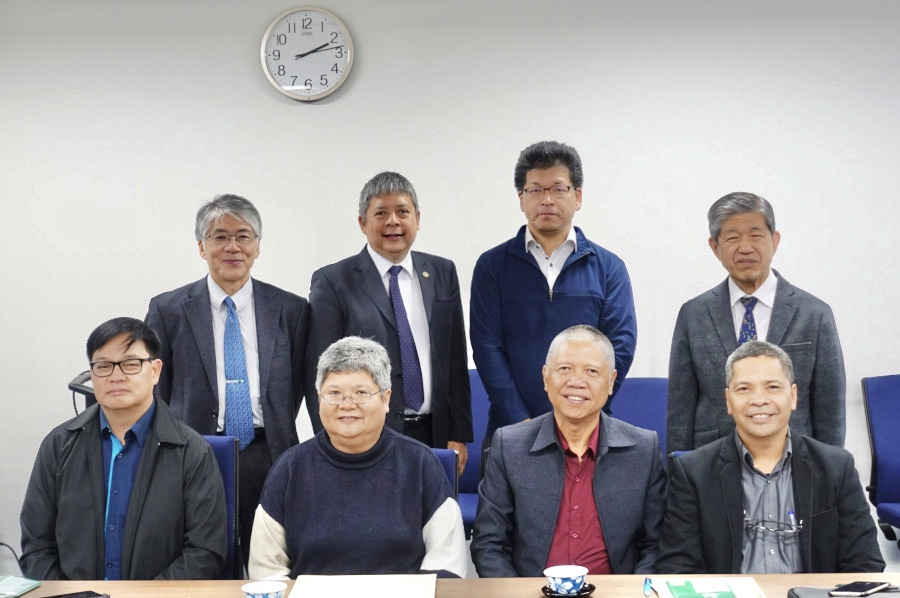
Mikio UMEDA (upper right), Prof. Dr. Michihisa IIDA (next), and GSA Vice Dean Prof. Eiji NAWATA (Upper left), with researchers from ERDT of the Philippines

Umeda has extensively held and been serving many high positions both in research and professional career life.

- Jul. 2020 – Present: Corporate Executive Advisor of MITAKY High-Tech Co., Ltd.
- Apr. 2014 – Present: Corporate Executive Advisor of Yanmar Agribusiness Co. Ltd.
- Jun. 2009 – Present: Director of Yagi Agriculture Corporation
- May 2009 – Mar. 2014: Professor of Kyoto University Career Support Center
- Apr. 2009 – Mar. 2013: Assessor of Yanmar Student Prize Thesis
- Apr. 2009 – Present: Professor emeritus at Kyoto University, Japan
- Jul. 2006 – Present: Associate Council Member of Science Council of Japan (SCJ)
- Apr. 1998 – Mar. 2009: Advisor of Kyoto University Football Club
- Apr. 1997 – Mar. 2007: Professor of Field Robotics and Precision Agriculture, Division of Environmental Science and Technology, Graduate School of Agriculture, Kyoto University
- Nov. 1994 – Mar. 1997: Associate Professor at Kyoto University, Japan
- Feb. 1994 – Oct. 1994: Visiting Researcher at University of Hohenheim, Stuttgart, Germany
- May 1992 – Feb. 1994: Associate Professor at Kyoto University, Japan
- Oct. 1987 – Apr. 1992: Lecturer of Agricultural Engineering at Kyoto University, Japan
- Apr. 1987 – Oct. 1987: Principal Engineer of Co-generation System Development Group of Sagamihara Machinery Works of Mitsubishi Heavy Industries, Ltd.
- Apr. 1981 – Apr. 1987: Senior Engineer of Mitsubishi Heavy Industries, Ltd.
- Apr. 1970 – Sep. 1981: Engineer of Mitsubishi Heavy Industries, Ltd.

== Awards and recognition ==
- 2011 – Fellow of Japan Association of International Commission of Agriculture And Biosystems Engineering (CIGR)
- 2005 – 3rd Paper Award of the Crop Science Society of Japan
- 2004 – Excellent Honorary Foreign Scientist of the Rural Development Administration of the Republic of Korea
- 1993 – 38th Academic Award of the Japanese Society of Agricultural Machinery (JSAM)

== See also ==
- Precision agriculture
- Agricultural robot
- List of Kyoto University people
- Kyoto University
