= Miyoshi (surname) =

Miyoshi (written: 三好, 三善, 三吉 or 見吉) is a Japanese surname. Notable people with the surname include:

- Akira Miyoshi (三善 晃, 1933–2013), Japanese composer
- Ayaka Miyoshi (三吉 彩花, born 1996), Japanese idol, singer, model and actress
- Erika Miyoshi (三好 絵梨香, born 1984), Japanese pop singer
- Hirochika Miyoshi (三好 洋央, born 1987), Japanese footballer
- Kiyotaka Miyoshi (三吉 聖王, born 1985), Japanese footballer
- Miyoshi Kiyotsura (三善 清行, 847–918), Japanese Confucianist
- Koji Miyoshi (三好 康児, born 1997), Japanese footballer
- Kōzō Miyoshi (三好 耕三, born 1947), Japanese photographer
- Manabu Miyoshi (1861–1939), Japanese botanist
- Mark Miyoshi, Japanese-American musical instrument maker
- Miyoshi Masanaga (三好 政長, 1508–1549), Japanese samurai and daimyō
- Masao Miyoshi (三好 将夫, 1928–2009), Japanese sociologist
- Miyoshi Nagayoshi (三好 長慶, 1522–1564), Japanese samurai and daimyō
- Naho Miyoshi (三好 南穂, born 1993), Japanese women's basketball player
- Satoru Miyoshi (三好 悟, born 1963), Japanese rower
- Shinrokuro Miyoshi (三好 晋六郎, 1856–1910), Japanese shipbuilding academic
- Takao Miyoshi (見吉 隆夫), Japanese video game producer
- Takuji Miyoshi (三好 拓児, born 1978), Japanese footballer
- Tatsuji Miyoshi (三好 達治, 1900–1964), Japanese poet, literary critic, and literary editor
- Tomohiro Miyoshi (三好 智弘, born 1970), Japanese swimmer
- Yasunori Miyoshi (三好 保徳, 1909–1995), Japanese zoologist, ichthyologist, and myriapodologist
- Miyoshi Yoshikata (三好 義賢, c. 1527 – 1562), Japanese samurai
- Miyoshi Yoshitsugu (三好 義継, 1549–1573), Japanese samurai and daimyō
- Sheila Miyoshi Jager (born 1963), American anthropologist

== Fictional characters ==
- Karin Miyoshi (三好 夏凜), a character in the anime series Yuki Yuna is a Hero

== See also ==
- Miyoshi clan, a Japanese clan
