= Reitaku University =

Coordinates: 35°49′58.97″N 139°57′16.94″E

- 麗澤大学; Reitaku daigaku
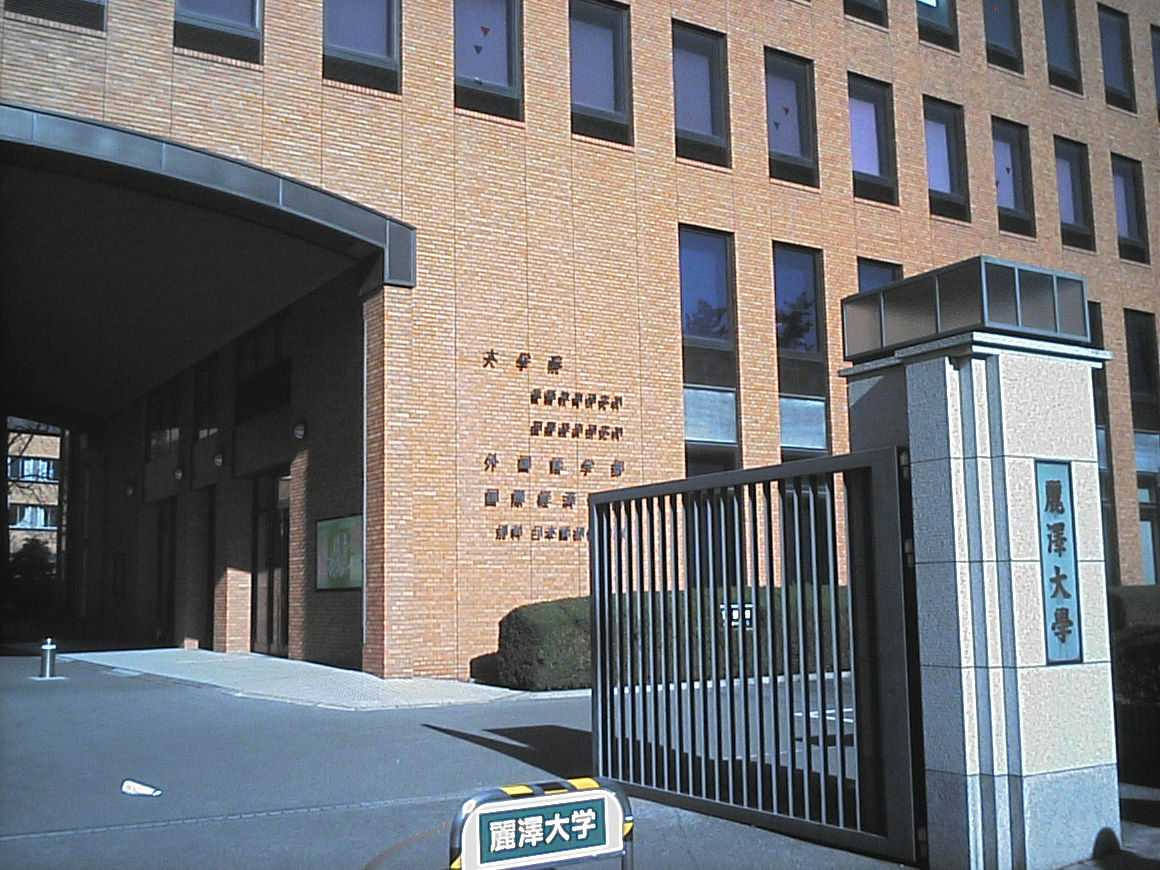
- Type: Private
- Established: 1935
- Location: Kashiwa, Chiba, Japan
- Website: Official website

Reitaku University (麗澤大学, Reitaku Daigaku) is a private university in Kashiwa, Chiba Prefecture, Japan. Below it is referred to as just Reitaku. The predecessor of Reitaku University was Moralogy School, launched in 1935, and Reitaku University itself was established in 1959.

== Department ==
Faculty of Foreign Studies

- English and Communication Studies
- English Language and Cultures
- International Exchange and Cooperation
- German Language and Culture
- Chinese Language
- Japanese and International Communication

Faculty of Economics and Business Administration

- Department of Economics
- Department of Business Administration
- Department of Specialized Courses
  - International Management and Communication(English)
  - Chinese Management and Communication(Chinese)
  - REPPL Civil Servant
  - REPPL Tax Accountant

Japanese Language Program

- Japanese Language Course

== International Student Program ==
All departments offer programs for studying abroad, collaborating with more than 30 universities in other countries. Foreign students come to Reitaku from the United States, China, Taiwan, South Korea, Vietnam, Bhutan, Germany, Finland and other countries.

Reitaku has many foreign professors, so its official languages are Japanese and English.

Reitaku gives scholarships ranging from US$1,000 to US$10,000 to students who go to study abroad.

== Research ==
Reitaku University has a Business Ethics and Compliance Center, which researches the legal and ethical environments of businesses.
