= Noriko Kamakura =

Occupational therapist (1939–2023)

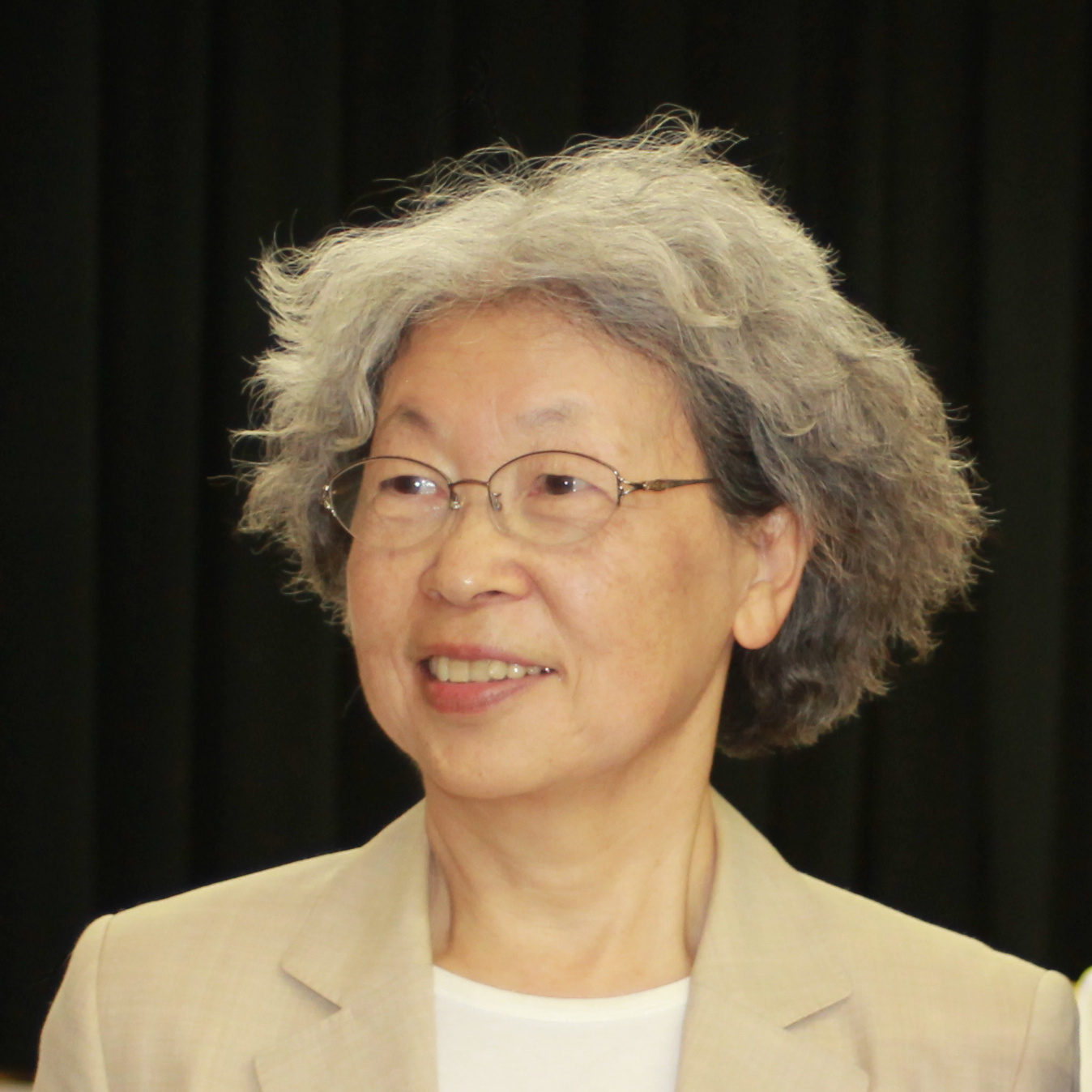
- Kamakura in 2012
- Born: September 29, 1939; Okaya, Nagano, Empire of Japan
- Died: June 16, 2023 (aged 83); Tokyo
- Education: The University of Tokyo
- Occupations: Occupational therapist; Professor emerita
- Years active: 1962–2008

Japanese name
- Kanji: 鎌倉 矩子
- Hiragana: かまくら のりこ
- Katakana: カマクラ ノリコ
Transcriptions
- Romanization: Kamakura Noriko

Noriko Kamakura (鎌倉 矩子; September 29, 1939 – June 16, 2023)^{:22} was a practitioner, researcher, and academic leader in occupational therapy. She was in the initial generation of people who became occupational therapists in Japan. She greatly influenced how occupational therapy developed in that country, contributing especially in clinical approaches to persons with central nervous disorders of executive functions. In addition, she explored function of the hand in enough detail to develop a system of taxonomies that can account for the vast majority of postures and movements of the hand.

== Education ==
- 1958: Graduated from Nagano Prefectural Suwa Futaba High School.
- 1962: Graduated from the University of Tokyo with a major in health and nursing.

In her third year, an impassioned lecture by an orthopedic surgeon on the need for physical therapy and occupational therapy in Japan left a strong impression.^{:30} Otherwise, the bulk of the coursework during her undergraduate years was excessively pedantic, making Kamakura determined to work in any area of health care other than nursing after graduating.^{:29}

- 1976: Awarded Doctor of Medical Science (医学博士) degree from the University of Tokyo.

== Career ==
=== (1962–1974) Occupational Therapist in the Clinic ===
In 1962, Noriko Kamakura found her first job at Seishiryōgoen (日本肢体不自由児協会整肢療護園) in Tokyo. At that time it was a residential facility for children with disabilities and her job as an "overcome trainer" (克服機能訓練士) was to "functionally train" children with cerebral palsy.^{:44} With no real expert to guide her or her six fellow "overcome trainers" in how to constructively help those children, she wallowed in despair. Half of the trainers would apply repetitive training to the arms of children, and the other half to the legs. Every six months the trainers would switch roles.^{:47–48} In 1963, when the government passed a law to establish physical therapists and occupational therapists in Japan, the administrator at Seishiryōgoen declared that the six-month rotation would cease and that the "overcome trainers" treating the arms at that time would henceforth be occupational therapists and those treating the legs would be physical therapists. And that stroke of fate is how Kamakura was to become an occupational therapist.^{:47–48}

One day, a physician at Seishiryōgoen asked Kamakura to give a child training in "fine skills" of the hand.^{:74} She was at a loss as to what to do and the problem festered in her mind for many years, eventually leading to over a decade of research on the human hand, detailed below.

In 1966 she became the first and only occupational therapist in the hospital at the University of Tokyo.^{:52} Then, in 1968, Kamakura had worked enough years to become eligible via a grandfather procedure to take the licensure examination for occupational therapists, which she passed. Right after that, she went to Highland View Hospital in Cleveland, Ohio, where she spent over a year to learn what occupational therapy was really about. The staff there welcomed her as a colleague and expected her to learn by participating. Kamakura did a credible job from their perspective, but secretly was disappointed not to have received genuine mentoring. As far as she was concerned, she did not learn as much as she had hoped to.^{:53–55}

Less than fully inspired by her clinical experience in the United States, Kamakura began 1970 determined to figure out on her own what occupational therapists should really be doing. One of her first patients after returning to Japan had Gerstmann syndrome, whose symptoms were so complex that she referred to a neuropathology textbook to learn how to assess the patient's myriad problems. By carefully studying this patient, Kamakura was able to identify specific problems and address each one as a mental skill to be relearned. The patient was a school teacher and wanted to return to the classroom. She worked with him for over a year to successfully get him back to work. This success was a watershed for Kamakura—for the first time, she realized that occupational therapy was something she wanted to continue doing for a long time. This encounter with a neurologically complex patient enkindled interest in an area that would become a major part of Kamakura's career: central nervous disorders involving higher functions. Kamakura saw a wider variety of patients, generally adults, than the predominance of cerebral palsy in the children she had seen at Seishiryōgoen. She worked most frequently with stroke patients, giving her ample opportunity to hone her skills and develop ideas for addressing problems of higher functions of the central nervous system.^{:75} By 1972 Kamakura had four other occupational therapists working with her at the University of Tokyo Hospital.^{:67–68}

=== (1974–1986) Full Time in Research ===
In 1974, Kamakura left her job at the University of Tokyo Hospital to become a researcher in the Tokyo Metropolitan Institute of Gerontology. Motivated by her previous clinical experiences, she decided first to study postures and movements of the hand.^{:v} Since she had been working with children and adults with central nervous impairments, her interest in the hand went well beyond structural and kinesiological problems of the hand itself to include how brain damage could affect posture of the hand as well as speed, smoothness, and pattern of hand movements. As she put it, her interest was in what the hand does.^{:v}

Initially she studied how wrist function affected ability to move fingers in the hands of hemiparetic patients. The results led her to investigate more deeply just what it is that hands normally do. She first looked at excursion of the wrist when healthy people handled different objects,^{:134–142} an investigation she performed for her doctoral thesis.^{:iv} Then she successively performed three comprehensive studies of the hand itself—on prehensile postures, non-prehensile postures, and patterns of finger movements. This series of studies, based on photographic and cinematic records of hands in numerous activities, lasted over a decade, ultimately yielding a system of taxonomies capable of precisely describing most normal postures and movements of the human hand.

Kamakura also engaged in studies on central nervous disorders of higher function, particularly apraxia and agnosia. She began with small numbers of patients, carefully analyzing their dysfunctions and attempting interventions targeted specifically at the problems she exposed. She then narrowed her investigative thrust to unilateral visual neglect, a problem frequently seen in left hemiparetic patients with lesions in the right cerebral hemisphere. She began those studies with an investigation to identify factors underlying the symptoms. Subsequently, she was to find that among patients with right hemispheric lesions, those who exhibited marked left-sided neglect had three notable characteristics. One was that the visual field that they covered when looking for something was relatively narrow as well as skewed to the right. Another was that their saccades were smaller in amplitude in all directions. And finally their methods of visual searching were more haphazard. From this Kamakura inferred that the unilateral neglect in these patients was not simply a neural block-out of the left visual field, but involved more general problems of neural dysfunction and of ability to attend to visual tasks. Understanding the scope of these patients' problems, she believed, would have implications in considering intervention.

=== (1986–2008) Academic Leader ===
In 1986, Kamakura left the research institute to become a faculty member at the newly established Tokyo Metropolitan College of Allied Medical Sciences. Her decision was based in great part on encouragement to do so by the orthopedic surgeon who had inspired her in her undergraduate years (and who had also supervised her doctoral thesis).^{:172} Conducting such courses as kinesiology, occupational therapy for disorders of higher nervous function, and occupational therapy for developmental disabilities, she continued her research on hand activities and higher nervous dysfunction.^{:177–186} Kamakura found, for example, that adjusting the nature of the items sought in a visual search task could affect the sensitivity for detecting unilateral neglect. While at the Tokyo Metropolitan College of Allied Medical Sciences, she also published a book that principally centered on her research of the hand while at the Tokyo Metropolitan Institute of Gerontology.

In 1992, the first four-year undergraduate programs for physical therapy and occupational therapy in Japan were set up at Hiroshima University, one of Japan's national universities. Kamakura was involved in the preparation, then joined the initial faculty in 1993.^{:204–207} In this curriculum she taught such courses as introduction to occupational therapy, occupational therapy for neuropsychological disorders, occupational therapy for geriatric disabilities, and research in occupational therapy.^{:212–213} Later, when the university established graduate programs in occupational therapy for master's and doctoral degrees, she was in charge of studies on rehabilitation for disorders of higher nervous function.^{:216–217} She was additionally involved in publishing books on rehabilitation, as evidenced in the section below on books.

By 2001, Kamakura had seen students through to completion of the undergraduate and graduate programs in occupational therapy at Hiroshima University. She then decided it was time to transfer to the International University of Health and Welfare, located in a more eastern part of Japan, motivated in part by her mother, who lived with her for eight years in Hiroshima and wanted to be closer to her home town in Nagano Prefecture. Kamakura's main function at the International University of Health and Welfare was to administratively oversee the development of its new graduate programs. She also mentored graduate students there and continued to write, as can be seen in the section on books.^{:216,312}

=== (2008-2023) Post-Academic Activity ===
The most recent entries in the list of books below attest to the fact that Noriko Kamakura continued to be active in her special areas of interest up to the time of her death. Her final work, on taxonomies she developed in the 1970s and 1980s to make functions of the human hand amenable to detailed description, is the only book that she published in English.

== Books ==
Principal works:

Kamakura, Noriko 鎌倉矩子 (1989). Postures of the Hand, Movements of the Hand 手のかたち 手のうごき. Tokyo: Ishiyaku Publishers 医歯薬出版. ISBN 978-4-263-19002-9.

Ito, Toshiyuki 伊藤利之; Kamakura, Noriko 鎌倉矩子, eds. (1994). Activities of Daily Living and Related Topics: Practices of Assessment, Guidance, and Assistance ＡＤＬとその周辺―評価・指導・介護の実際. Tokyo: Igaku Shoin 医学書院. ISBN 978-4-260-24347-6.

Kamakura, Noriko 鎌倉矩子; Tanaka, Shigeru 田中繁, eds. (1995). Kinesiology Practicum for PT and OT Students: From Biomechanics to Activity Analysis ＰＴ・ＯＴ学生のための運動学実習―生体力学から動作学まで. Tokyo: Miwa Shoten 三輪書店. ISBN 978-4-89590-032-4.

Kamakura, Noriko 鎌倉矩子; Miyamae, Tamako 宮前珠子; Shimizu, Hajime 清水一著 (1997). Introduction to Research for Occupational Therapists 作業療法士のための研究法入門. Tokyo: Miwa Shoten 三輪書店. ISBN 978-4-89590-068-3.

Kamakura, Noriko 鎌倉矩子 (2001). The World of Occupational Therapy: For Those Who Want to Know and Think about Occupational Therapy 作業療法の世界－作業療法を知りたい・考えたい人のために. Tokyo: Miwa Shoten 三輪書店. ISBN 978-4-89590-148-2.

Wilson, Barbara A. (2003). Case Studies in Neuropsychological Rehabilitation 事例で見る神経心理学的リハビリテーション. Translated by Kamakura, Noriko 鎌倉矩子; Yamasaki, Setsuko 山﨑せつ子. Tokyo: Miwa Shoten 三輪書店. ISBN 978-4-89590-190-1.

Kamakura, Noriko 鎌倉矩子 (2004). The World of Occupational Therapy: For Those Who Want to Know and Think about Occupational Therapy 作業療法の世界―作業療法を知りたい・考えたい人のために (2nd ed.). Tokyo: Miwa Shoten 三輪書店. ISBN 978-4-89590-205-2.

Ito, Toshiyuki 伊藤利之; Kamakura, Noriko 鎌倉矩子, eds. (2008). Activities of Daily Living and Related Topics: Practices of Assessment, Guidance, and Assistance ＡＤＬとその周辺―評価・指導・介護の実際 (2nd ed.). Tokyo: Igaku Shoin 医学書院. ISBN 978-4-260-00568-5.

Kamakura, Noriko 鎌倉矩子; Honda, Rumi 本多留美 (2010). Occupational Therapy for Higher Nervous Dysfunction 高次脳機能障害の作業療法. Tokyo: Miwa Shoten 三輪書店. ISBN 978-4-89590-359-2.

Kamakura, Noriko 鎌倉矩子; Nakada, Mayumi 中田眞由美, eds. (2013). Enhancing Your Ability to Observe the Hand 手を診る力をきたえる. Tokyo: Miwa Shoten 三輪書店. ISBN 978-4-89590-448-3.

Kamakura, Noriko 鎌倉矩子; Iwasaki, Kiyotaka 岩﨑清隆, eds. (2015). Establishing Occupational Therapy: The Challenge of Women (Nadeshiko) and Men (Samurai) over the Last 50 Years 作業療法を創る―この50年のナデシコ・サムライたちの挑戦. Tokyo: Seikaisha 青海社. ISBN 978-4-902249-78-1.

Kamakura, Noriko (2022). Postures and Movement Patterns of the Human Hand: A Framework for Understanding Hand Activity for Clinicians and Engineers. Irvine, Boca Raton, USA: BrownWalker Press. ISBN 978-1-59942-630-3.

== Honors ==
1995: Award from the Minister of Health, Labour and Welfare [厚生労働大臣表彰]^{:195}

1996: Service award from the Japanese Association of Occupational Therapists [日本作業療法士協会の協会表彰]^{:192}

2010: Honorary member of the Japanese Association of Occupational Therapists [日本作業療法士協会の名誉会員]^{:192}

2022: Order of the Sacred Treasure, Gold Rays with Rosette [瑞宝小綬章]
