= Kimie Iwata =

Japanese businesswoman and government official (1947-)

- 岩田喜美枝
- Born: April 6, 1947 (age 79); Kagawa Prefecture, Japan
- Occupations: Businesswoman and government official

Kimie Iwata (岩田喜美枝) (born April 6, 1947) is a Japanese businesswoman and former government official. After serving as Director-General of the Equal Employment Opportunity and Child Families Bureau of the Ministry of Health, Labor and Welfare, she has served as Executive Vice President of Shiseido and Chairman of the Japan Foundation for 21st Century Vocational Education.

== Career ==
Born in Kagawa Prefecture to a father who taught high school and a mother who taught elementary school. She attended Kagawa Prefectural Takamatsu High School. In 1971 she both graduated from the Faculty of Liberal Arts at the University of Tokyo and then joined the Ministry of Labor. After serving as head of the Osaka Women's and Youth Affairs Division, she became head of the Welfare Division of the Workers' Welfare Department of the Labor Administration Bureau in 1991, head of the Women's Policy Division of the Women's Bureau in 1992, head of the International Labor Division of the Minister of Labor's Secretariat in 1994, head of the Secretariat of the Minister of Labor's Secretariat in 1995 , and deputy director-general for general affairs at the Minister of Labor's Secretariat in 1998. She became director -general of the Employment Equality, Children and Families Bureau of the Ministry of Health, Labor and Welfare in 2001.

In 2003, she retired from the Ministry of Health, Labour and Welfare and joined Shiseido. In the same year, she became a full-time advisor, in 2004 she became a director and executive officer, and in 2007 she became a director and executive officer, before being appointed representative director and executive vice president in 2008. She is the first woman to be appointed to the vice president position at Shiseido. In March 2012, she became an auditor for Kirin Company, a director of Shiseido in April 2012, and a director of Japan Airlines and an advisor to Shiseido in July.

In July 2012, she became Chairman of the 21st Century Career Foundation. In September 2013, she became a member of the Consumer Affairs Commission of the Cabinet Office. In October 2015, he became an audit commissioner for Tokyo Metropolitan Government. In March 2016, she became a director of Kirin Holdings Company, Limited. In April 2016, she became a director of Stripe International. In April 2018, she became a member of the Niigata University Administrative Council. In June 2018, she became a director of Sumitomo Corporation. In the spring of 2018, she received the Order of the Sacred Treasure, Gold Rays with Neck Ribbon. In June 2019, she became a director of Resona Holdings and Ajinomoto.

Iwata has been a staunch supporter of women's equality. She is a member of the Cabinet Office's Council for Gender Equality, a member of the Japan Association of Corporate Executives, a representative director of the Working Women's Empowerment Conference, and a vice president of the NPO United Nations Women Japan. Iwata is Chairman at Japan Institute of Worker’s Evolution where she supported women, diversity, corporate responsibility, and workers. One area related to this that she focused on was balancing a woman's work and child rearing roles and combatting the societal belief that men should be the breadwinner and women should do the housework and child-rearing. Iwata supports changing the Japanese law that requires a married couple to choose only one surname but does not want to force the use of two separate surnames.

Her husband is Kazumasa Iwata, a former deputy governor of the Bank of Japan.

== Selected works ==
- "私の見たOECD" [My View of the OECD]. World Labor (in Japanese). 29 (10). October 1979.
- "大卒女子の就職問題" [Employment Issues for Female University Graduates]. Youth Issues (in Japanese). 31 (5). May 1984.
- "岩田喜美枝厚生労働省雇用均等・児童家庭局長 待機児童ゼロ作戦や放課後対策等を推進」週刊社会保障" [Ask this person: Kimie Iwata, Director-General of the Ministry of Health, Labor and Welfare's Bureau of Equal Employment Opportunity and Children and Families, promoting the Zero Waiting List Campaign and after-school programs]. Weekly Social Security (in Japanese) (2151). 2001.
- Mizuta, Muneko, ed. (2005). "女性と仕事" [Women and Work]. Pioneering a Bright 21st Century: Declining Birthrates, Aging Populations, Local Government, Work, Medical Care and Welfare (in Japanese). Shinjuku Shobo.
- "企業の人材マネジメントからの示唆 資生堂の事例から" [Suggestions from Corporate Human Resource Management: The Case of Shiseido]. Local Government Officials Monthly Report (in Japanese) (531). October 2007.
- "女性はもっと活躍できる! -女性活躍推進の課題とポイント" [Women can be more active! -Challenges and key points for promoting women's participation in the workforce]. 21st Century Career Foundation (in Japanese). 2015.
