= Akira Yanabu =

Japanese researcher

Akira Yanabu (柳父 章, Yanabu Akira) (1928 – 2 January 2018) was a Japanese researcher in the areas of translation studies and comparative literature. He was born in Tokyo and graduated from the University of Tokyo.

== Works ==
- Honnyakugo Seiritsu Jijou [翻訳語成立事情] (1982), Iwanami Shinsho
