= Hiroaki Nakanishi =

Japanese businessman (1946–2021)

- 中西 宏明
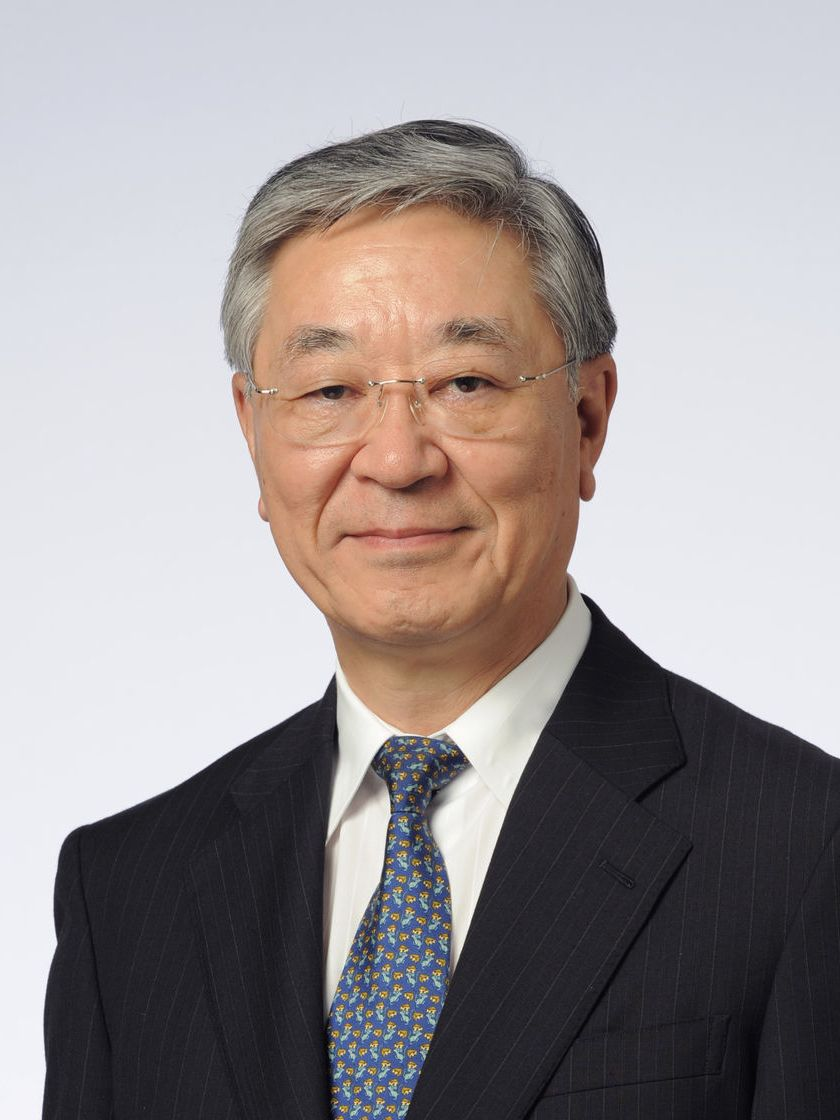

Chairman of Hitachi
- In office April 1, 2014 – June 1, 2021
- Preceded by: Takashi Kawamura
- Succeeded by: Masakazu Tokura

10th President of Hitachi
- In office 2010–2014
- Preceded by: Takashi Kawamura
- Succeeded by: Toshiaki Higashihara

Personal details
- Born: March 14, 1946 Yokohama, Japan
- Died: June 27, 2021 (aged 75)
- Education: University of Tokyo; Stanford University
- Occupation: Businessman

Hiroaki Nakanishi (中西 宏明, Nakanishi Hiroaki; March 14, 1946 – June 27, 2021) was a Japanese businessman and chairman of Hitachi. He became the 10th president of Hitachi in 2010, and in 2014, assumed the position of chairman and CEO. He was also chairman of the compensation committee and general manager of the post-earthquake reconstruction & redevelopment division. Nakanishi acted as head of the Japan Business Federation from 2018 until his resignation less than a month before his death.

== Early life and education ==
Nakanishi was born in Yokohama, Japan on March 14, 1946. He studied electrical engineering at the University of Tokyo, obtaining a bachelor's degree in 1970 and joining Hitachi one month later. He later attended Stanford University, receiving a master's degree in computer engineering in 1979.

== Business career ==
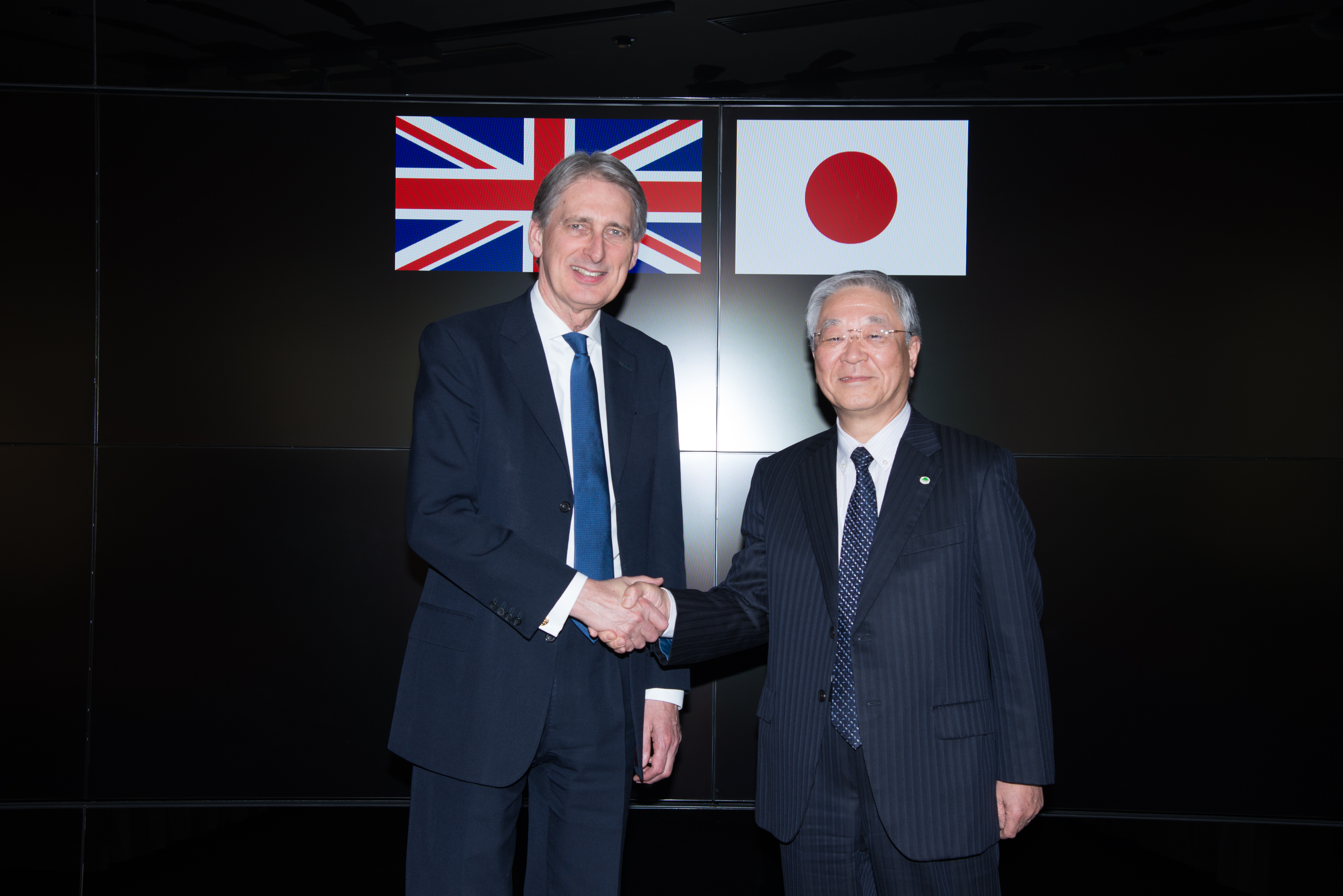
Hiroaki Nakanishi with Philip Hammond (January 8, 2016)

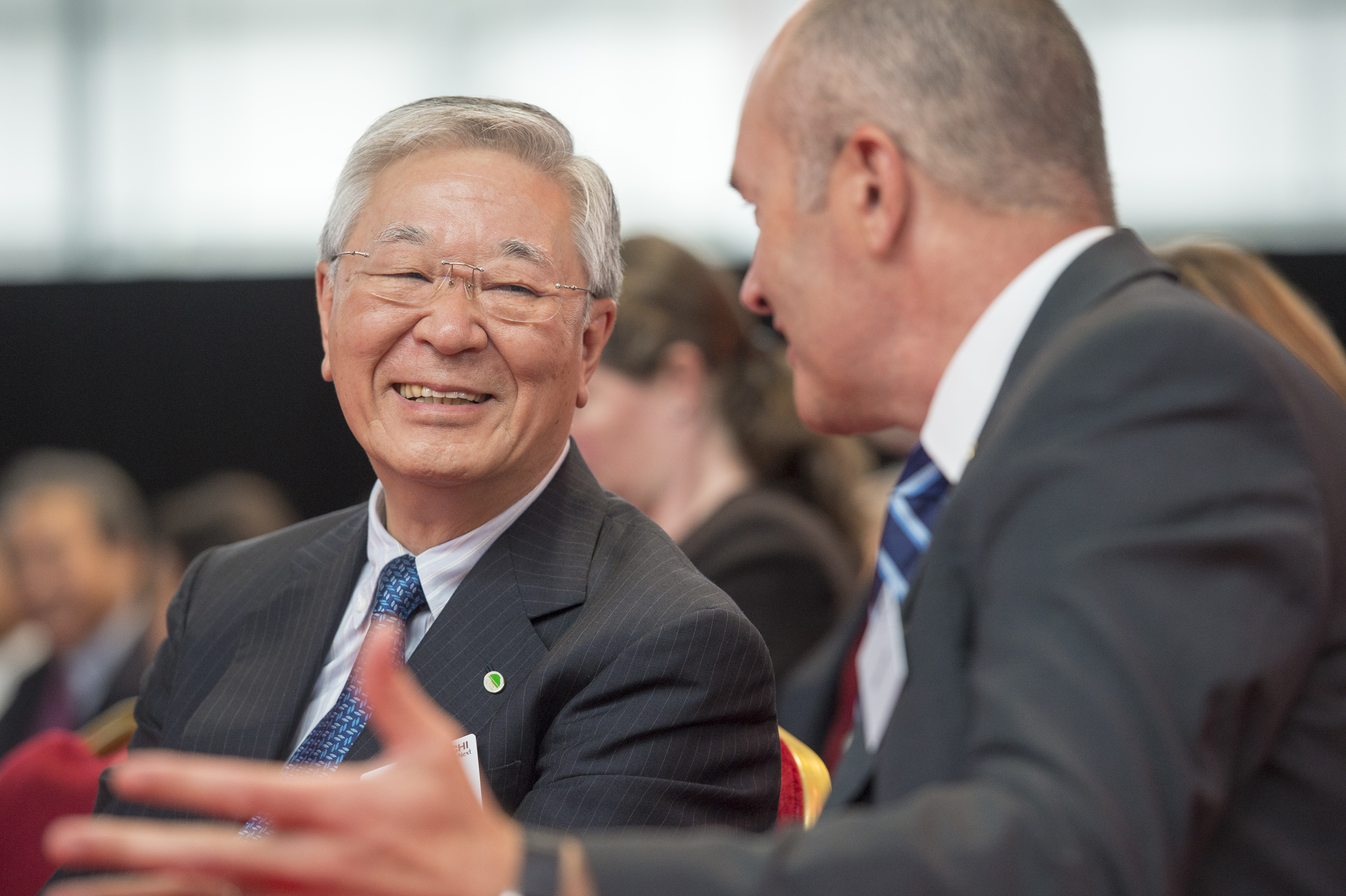
Hitachi CEO Hiroaki Nakanishi with Hitachi Rail Global CEO Alistair Dormer at Newton Aycliffe opening ceremony

Nakanishi joined Hitachi's Omika Works Computer Control Design Department in 1970 immediately after graduating from college. His first management position was in the Information and Telecommunications Group. He became the managing director of Hitachi Europe in 1998, before being promoted to senior vice president six years later. He became the chairman of Hitachi America and chairman of Hitachi Global Storage Technologies in 2007. This was regarded as a "consolation prize" for being passed on as the parent company's president. However, he and other colleagues were called back to the parent group after it sustained record losses for a Japanese manufacturer in 2009.

Nakanishi became president of Hitachi in 2010. He started the Smart Transformation Project which restructured the company following the 2008 financial crisis, including the sale of HGST (Hitachi storage business) to Western Digital. He established a board of directors at Hitachi similar to ones in the Western world, with non-executive directors holding a majority. Under his leadership, the company gradually decreased the number of its subsidiaries listed on the Tokyo Stock Exchange from over twenty to just two.

Nakanishi was chosen as chairman of the Japan Business Federation (Keidanren) in 2018. This was welcomed by local and international investors, who saw the election of the reformist Nakanishi to the conservative business lobby as recognition by the Keidanren that it needed to make improvements to corporate governance. As chairman, he advocated for the government to invest in digital technology, a drive supported by Yoshihide Suga upon becoming prime minister in 2020. He was also instrumental in prompting the Federation to support the country's promise to become carbon neutral by 2050, in spite of its traditional opposition to climate change initiatives.

== Later life ==
Nakanishi received treatment for lymphoma starting in 2019. He was hospitalized again in mid-July 2020, and reportedly in remission in March 2021. However, the cancer returned one month later, and he resigned as chairman of the Japan Business Federation at the end of May. This was the first time that the head of the business lobby resigned before completing his term. He died less than a month later on June 27, at the age of 75.

Business positions
Preceded by Takashi Kawamura	President of Hitachi; 2010–2014	Succeeded by Toshiaki Higashihara
Preceded by Takashi Kawamura	Chairman of Hitachi; 2014–2021	Vacant
