= Masahito Hayashi =

Japanese professor of data science and information theory

- Education: Kyoto University
- Occupation: Professor of Data Science
- Awards: Japan Academy Medal (2015)
- Scientific career
- Fields: Information Theory, Quantum information
- Workplaces: The Chinese University of Hong Kong
- Doctoral advisor: Kenji Ueno
- Website: mhayashi.info

Masahito Hayashi is a Japanese professor working on quantum statistical inference and quantum information theory. He is known for his contributions to statistical inference for quantum systems, quantum hypothesis testing, quantum resource theories, and has published several books on the topics.

Hayashi was named an IEEE fellow in 2017 for his contributions to Shannon theory, information-theoretic security, and quantum information theory. Hayashi was selected to be a fellow of the Asia Pacific Artificial Intelligence Association in 2022, the same year he became a fellow of the Institute of Mathematical Statistics.

Hayashi was a part of a team that proved the generalized Quantum Stein's Lemma after flaws were found in the initial proofs, published at roughly the same time as the proof by Ludovico Lami.

== Books ==
- Asymptotic Theory Of Quantum Statistcial Inference: Selected Papers, 2005, World Scientific Publishing, doi:10.1142/5630
- Quantum Computation and Information, 2006, Springer Berlin, Heidelberg, doi:10.1007/3-540-33133-6
- Introduction to Quantum Information Science, 2014, Springer Berlin, Heidelberg, doi:10.1007/978-3-662-43502-1
- Quantum Information Theory, 2017, Springer-Verlag, Heidelber, doi:10.1007/978-3-662-49725-8
- Group Representation for Quantum Theory, 2017, Springer Cham, doi:10.1007/978-3-319-44906-7
- A Group Theoretic Approach to Quantum Information, 2017, Springer Cham, doi:10.1007/978-3-319-45241-8
