= Hidegorō Nakano =

Japanese mathematician

- Born: 16 May 1909; Tokyo
- Died: 11 March 1974 (aged 64); Detroit, Michigan, US
- Education: National First High School, Imperial University of Tokyo
- Known for: Nakano Spaces, mathematical analysis, functional analysis, set theory, lattice theory
- Spouse: Sumiko Yamamura
- Children: 2
- Scientific career
- Fields: Mathematics
- Workplaces: National First High School, Imperial University of Tokyo, Hokkaido University, Queen's University, Wayne State University
- Doctoral advisor: Takuji Yoshie

Hidegorō Nakano (Japanese: 中野 秀五郎; 16 May 1909 – 11 March 1974) is a Japanese mathematician, after whom Nakano Spaces are named.

== Life ==
Nakano was born as the first son of Katsugoro Nakano and Kame Nakano, in Tokyo. After graduating from National First High School, a preparatory school for the Imperial University of Tokyo, he progressed to study mathematics in Tokyo Imperial University and graduated with a Bachelor of Science in 1933. Then he entered Graduate School at the same university under the supervision of Takuji Yoshie, and attained his doctoral degree in 1935. At that time, a doctorate was more commonly awarded to people over 50 years old.

Nakano started teaching in The National First High School in 1935. At the same year he married Sumiko Yamamura (11 December 1913, Tokyo - 5 March 1999, Detroit). Then he held academic positions (1938-1952) in Tokyo Imperial University, before moving to Hokkaido University and being appointed as a professor.

In 1960, he left Japan and took a visit to Queen's University in Canada for a year, under the invitation of Canadian Mathematical Congress. He then took up professorship in Wayne State University, Detroit, US, in 1961, and continued working there until his death in 1974.

== Works ==
=== Nakano's name in mathematics ===
Nakano is known for his research in Functional Analysis, especially in vector lattice and operator theory in Hilbert spaces. He mainly made his name in his contribution to several mathematical subjects around modulars, Riesz spaces, Orlicz-Nakano spaces and Nakano space.

=== List of books with name translated from Japanese ===
- From Riemann integral to Lebesgue integral (1940)
- Hilbert Space Theory (1946)
- Classical Integration Theory (1949)
- Measure Theory (1950)
- Banach Space Theory (1953)
- Set Theory (1955)
- Real Number Theory (1956)
- How to teach mathematics (1956)
- Problems in Mathematics (1956).

=== List of books in English ===
- Modern Spectral Theory (1950)
- Modulared Semi-Ordered Linear Spaces (1950)
- Topology of linear topological spaces (1951)
- Spectral theory in the Hilbert space (1953)
- Semi-ordered linear spaces (1955)
- Linear lattices (1966)
- Uniform spaces and transformation groups (1968)
