= Shigeaki Sugeta =

Japanese linguist

- 菅田 茂昭
- Born: 2 June 1933 (age 93); Yamaguchi Prefecture
- Education: Waseda University; University of Tokyo
- Occupations: linguist, university professor, director of the Japanese Society of Romance Linguistics, advisor to the Institute of Italian Studies of Waseda University

Shigeaki Sugeta (born 2 June 1933) is a Japanese linguist. Emeritus professor of General, Romance and Italian Linguistics at the University of Waseda, and now advisor to the Institute of Italian Studies of the same university, is the author of the first ever Sardinian-Japanese vocabulary.

== Biography ==
Born in Yamaguchi-Ken, Shigeaki Sugeta graduated in Literature in 1957 from the Department of English Language and Literature at Waseda University in Tokyo, and again in Literature in 1959 in the Department of Glotology from the University of Tokyo.

From 1962 to 1964 he was a scholarship holder of the Italian government at the University of Florence, where he attended Bruno Migliorini's lessons. In 1964, for the first time, he arrived in Sardinia and began studying the Sardinian language. During the years he travelled to Sardinia many other times, talking in fluent Sardinian with the locals.

From 1993 to 1997 he was Director of the Japanese Society of Romance Linguistics (Societas Japonica Studiorum Romanicorum), and he taught for years in his professorships of General, Romance and Italian at the University of Waseda.

At Waseda University he has been teaching Sardinian courses for 31 years, and to help his students he created the first Sardinian-Japanese vocabulary in 1984. The same dictionary, with the addition of translations into Italian, was published again by the publishing house "Edizioni della Torre" in 2000. For his work, he received the "La Marmora" award (the eighteenth edition) of the Rotary Club of Cagliari and the "Mirto d'Oro defender of the Sardinians" award in 2000.

In 2003 he collaborated with the University of Cagliari, organizing an international conference dedicated to the language and culture of Sardinia at the University of Waseda, thanks to a memorandum of understanding stipulated in 2002.

In 2002 he became a consultant to the Institute of Italian Studies at the University of Waseda.

In 2010 he gave a lectio magistralis at the Ciusa Institute of Nuoro about Sardinian, where he declared himself in favor of unification and standardization of its orthographies to save it from extinction. He also talked about how he began to know and appreciate it.

== Publications ==
Shigeaki Sugeta's curriculum vitae is quite extensive, and there are articles and books that deal with the Sardinian, Italian and other romance languages too. This is an (incomplete) list of his publications:

- Sugeta, Shigeaki (1972). Gendai itariago niyumon (in Japanese). Tokyo: Tokyo Daigaku Shorin. OCLC 963493610.
- Sugeta, Shigeaki (1979). "Cento anni di linguistica italiana in Italia: 1873-1973". Studia gratularia dedicati a Robert A. Hall Jr (in Italian). Madrid. OCLC 963265136.
- 伊東英; 早稲田大学; 語学教育研究所 (1986). Shigeaki Sugeta (ed.). Linguarum romanicarum tabula chronologica/ロマンス語学年表 (in Japanese). Tokyo: 早稲田大学語学教育研究所. OCLC 33608330.
- Shigeaki Sugeta, Il sintagma nominale del tipo "parola chiave" in italiano e nelle altre lingue romanze (in Italian), edited by Fabio Foresti, Elena Rizzi e Paola Benedini, "Ventesimo Congresso internazionale degli studi", Bologna, 25–27 September 1986, Roma, 1989.
- Shigeaki Sugeta (1991). "La palatizzazione nelle lingue romanze con particolare riguardo all'italiano e al sardo". Studia Romanica (in Italian) (24). Tokyo.
- Shigeaki Sugeta (1993). "La lingua sarda". Le lingue del mondo (in Italian). Taishukan.
- Shigeaki Sugeta, La terza persona singolare del verbo in -T fra le proprietà della lingua sarda (in Italian), "XIX Congresso internazionale della linguistica romanza", La Coruña, 1989, 1993.
- Shigeaki Sugeta (1995). "F. de Saussure et la formation des mots". In Tullio de Mauro e Shigeaki Sugeta (ed.). Saussure and linguistics today (in French). Roma: Bulzoni. ISBN 978-88-7119-829-3. OCLC 925899813.
- Shigeaki Sugeta, Aspetti problematici della lessicalizzazione nelle lingue romanze (in Italian), edited by Paolo Ramat, "XXX Congresso internazionale di studi", Pavia, 26–28 September 1996, Roma, 1998.
- Shigeaki Sugeta, Fattori mediterranei negli esiti romanzi? - a proposito del cambiamento C > G in posizione iniziale (in Italian), "XXI Congresso internazionale della linguistica romanza", Palermo, 1995, Palermo, 1998.
- Shigeaki Sugeta (2000) [1984]. Su Bocabolariu Sinotticu nugoresu · giapponesu · italianu - sas 1500 paragulas fundamentales de sa limba sarda (in Sardinian, Japanese, and Italian). introdutzione de Dolores Turchi. Edizioni della torre. ISBN 88-7343-333-2. OCLC 879111035.
- Shigeaki Sugeta (2002). "Il sardo nel panorama romanzo". In Tullio de Mauro e Shigeaki Sugeta (ed.). Lesser-used languages and Romance linguistics (in Italian). Bulzoni. ISBN 978-88-8319-789-5. OCLC 882742836.
- Shigeaki Sugeta, Fra la derivazione e la composizione - l'italiano del Novecento fra le lingue romanze (in Italian), "L'italiano oltre frontiera", Lovanio, 1998, Firenze.
