= Matsuoka Shinpei =

Japanese academic

- Born: October 29, 1954 (age 71); Okayama Prefecture
- Occupation: Noh Scholar
- Years active: 1984-present
- Known for: Todai Professor
- Notable work: Basara kara Zeami e Nō: Chūsei kara no hibiki

Shinpei Matsuoka (松岡心平, Matsuoka Shinpei) is a Japanese Professor Emeritus at the University of Tokyo Graduate School of Arts and Sciences, Liberal Arts faculty, and considered to be the preeminent living scholar of Nōgaku, the 14th century style of Japanese theater.

== Biography ==
Born in Okayama Prefecture, Shinpei was a son of Yoshiaki Matsuoka (1918–1995), president of Sanyo Shimbun. Graduating from Okayama Sozan High School, Shipei intended to study law at University of Tokyo when he saw Hisao Kanze perform a shimai (Noh in plain clothes) of Fujito, and was so inspired that he would switch his major to the Department of Japanese Literature, graduating in 1978.

Continuing on an academic path, Shinpei completed a doctorate in 1984, becoming a full-time lecturer at the Faculty of Letters in 1987, assistant professor at the College of Arts and Sciences in 1990, and fully tenured at the Graduate School of Arts and Sciences in 2001. Shinpei retired from full-time instruction in 2020, but remains active in his research of Noh and feudal Japan from an interdisciplinary perspective.

A prolific author and writer, Shinpei has published numerous works on Noh, Nōgaku, and medieval Japan.

== Selected bibliography ==
- Utage no shintai: Basara kara Zeami e (宴の身体 バサラから世阿弥へ), Iwanami Shoten、1991
- Nō: Chūsei kara no hibiki (能 中世からの響き), Kadokawa, 1998
- What is Noh? (能って何？), Shinshokan, 2000
- Demons and Performing Arts (鬼と芸能 東アジアの演劇形成), Moriwasha, 2000
- Chusei o tsukutta hitobito(中世を創った人びと), Shinshokan, 2001
- Chusei geino kogi : Kanjin tenno renga zen (中世芸能を読む), Iwanami Shoten, 2002
- Talking about Zeami (世阿弥を語れば), Iwanami Shoten, 2003
- Noh no mikata (能大和の世界 物語の舞台を歩く), Yamakawa, 2011
- The World of Kanze Motoaki (観世元章の世界), Edited by Hinoki Shoten, 2014
