= Kenkichi Yabashi =

Japanese architect

Senior Third Rank Yabashi Kenkichi
- 矢橋 賢吉
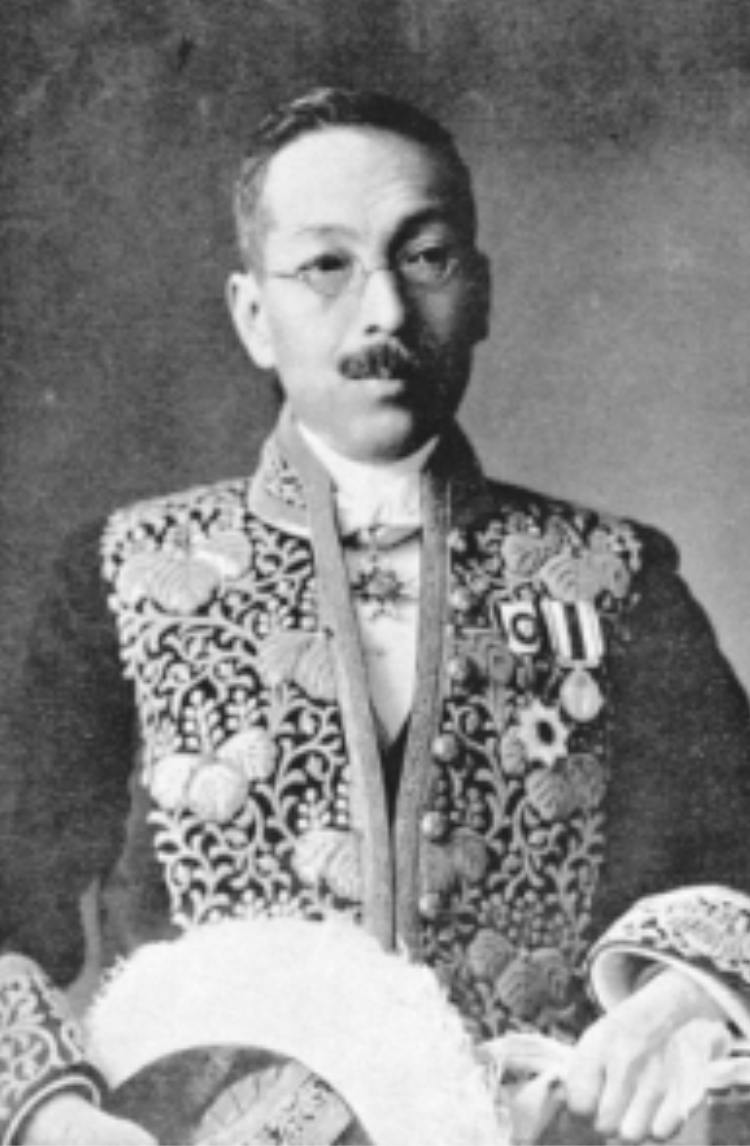
- Kenkichi Yabashi
- Born: October 24, 1869; Akasaka, Japan
- Died: May 24, 1927 (aged 57); Tokyo, Japan
- Education: Doctor of Engineering
- Alma mater: Imperial University Imperial College of Engineering
- Occupation: architect

Kenkichi Yabashi (矢橋 賢吉, Yabashi Kenkichi; October 24, 1869 - May 24, 1927) was a Japanese architect and high-level official of Ministry of Finance, known as the person from the Yabashi family that has the known pedigree record dating back to the Saga Genji (嵯峨源氏) and Minamoto no Tōru (源融) who is sometimes mentioned as the model for Hikaru Genji (光源氏) in important Japanese literary classic The Tale of Genji (源氏物語), a branch line of Emperor Saga. He is known as the central figure who organised the construction of National Diet Building.

== Biography ==
Kenkichi Yabashi was born in Akasaka-juku (Nakasendō). He was from Sō-honke (the primary head family) of the Yabashis, a distinguished family that Emperor Shōwa in 1946 and Emperor Heisei in 1965 when he was crown prince officially visited. It is said that he loved fishing so much and so often went fishing to Kuise River near the house where he grew up, loved igo with the skill of first grade (sho-dan) because he studied igo under Hon'inbō, grand master of the game of go, loved bonsai and reached to the level beyond amateurs regarding jōruri.

He married Suteko Watanabe, the second daughter of Itaru Watanabe, former Samurai of Ehime Prefecture, who was the former Director General of Nagasaki Customs (Ministry of Finance) whose building was designed and constructed by Kenkichi Yabashi as his 1st work after joining Ministry of Finance. Kenkichi graduated from Akasaka Elementary School, Akasaka Junior High School, First Higher School (:ja:) and Imperial University Imperial College of Engineering in 1894 where he studied under Tatsuno Kingo and so on.

He was the right-hand person of Tsumaki Yorinaka, called one of "Three Great Masters" in Meiji Era together with Tatsuno Kingo and Katayama Tōkuma, who was the high-level official with supreme power in the Bureau of building and repairs of Ministry of Finance. Yabashi also held the position of professor in charge of freehand drawing and perspective drawing at Koshu Gakko (工手学校, lit. technicians school, now Kogakuin University) founded in 1887 by educator, politician, and president of Tokyo Imperial University, Koki Watanabe, and professors of Tokyo Imperial University and resigned in 1902.

In 1902, he was appointed by Ministry of Agriculture and Commerce as a member of Preparatory Committee for the US Expo, went to the United States in order to select the premises for Louisiana Purchase Exposition in 1902 and came back to Japan in March, 1903. Again in 1908, he was ordered to make on an official trip in order to survey government buildings in western countries, firstly left for the US, Washington and state capitols, went to Europe such as Great Britain, Germany, France, Italy, Switzerland, Austria and Russia after Canada to study architectural history and the method of design and supervision. He came back to Japan in 1909. The survey result was submitted to Katsura Tarō, the then Minister of Finance.

In 1910, the official system of the preparatory committee for constructing the Diet Building was promulgated and Katsura Tarō who was then Prime Minister and Minister of Finance became the chairman of the committee and Yabashi was ordered to take charge of the secretariat of the committee. In 1913, Tsumaki Yorinaka with tremendous power who had been Yabashi's superior since Yabashi joined Ministry of Finance resigned his post for health reasons, which meant the opening of Yabashi's era. In 1916 when Tsumaki suddenly died at 58, the investigating committee for constructing the Diet Building was established, Otohiko Ichiki, Administrative Vice-Minister of Finance, became the chairman and 12 persons including Yabashi and Tatsuno Kingo, Yabashi's former professor at Imperial College of Engineering, became the members of the committee. On 25 March 1919, Tatsuno Kingo with big influence on Japanese architect world suddenly died at the age of 66. In 1919, Yabashi received the degree of "Doctor of Engineering".

On May 24, 1927, Kenkichi Yabashi suddenly died of intercerebral hemorrhage at his home in Shibuya at the age of 58 without seeing the completion of National Diet Building which was formally designed by the Bureau of building and repairs of Ministry of Finance based on prize competition design as advocated by Tatsuno Kingo and completed in 1936 over 17 years. He was laid to rest in Aoyama Cemetery.

When Kenkichi Yabashi died, he was assigned to Senior Third Rank and awarded the Order of the Rising Sun, Gold and Silver Star, Second Class together with two volumes of white silk due to the merit while he was alive from Shōwa Emperor.

== Honours ==
- Senior Third Rank (1927)
- the Order of the Rising Sun, Gold and Silver Star, Second Class (1927)

== Gallery ==
Selected Buildings that Kenkichi Yabashi was involved in constructing
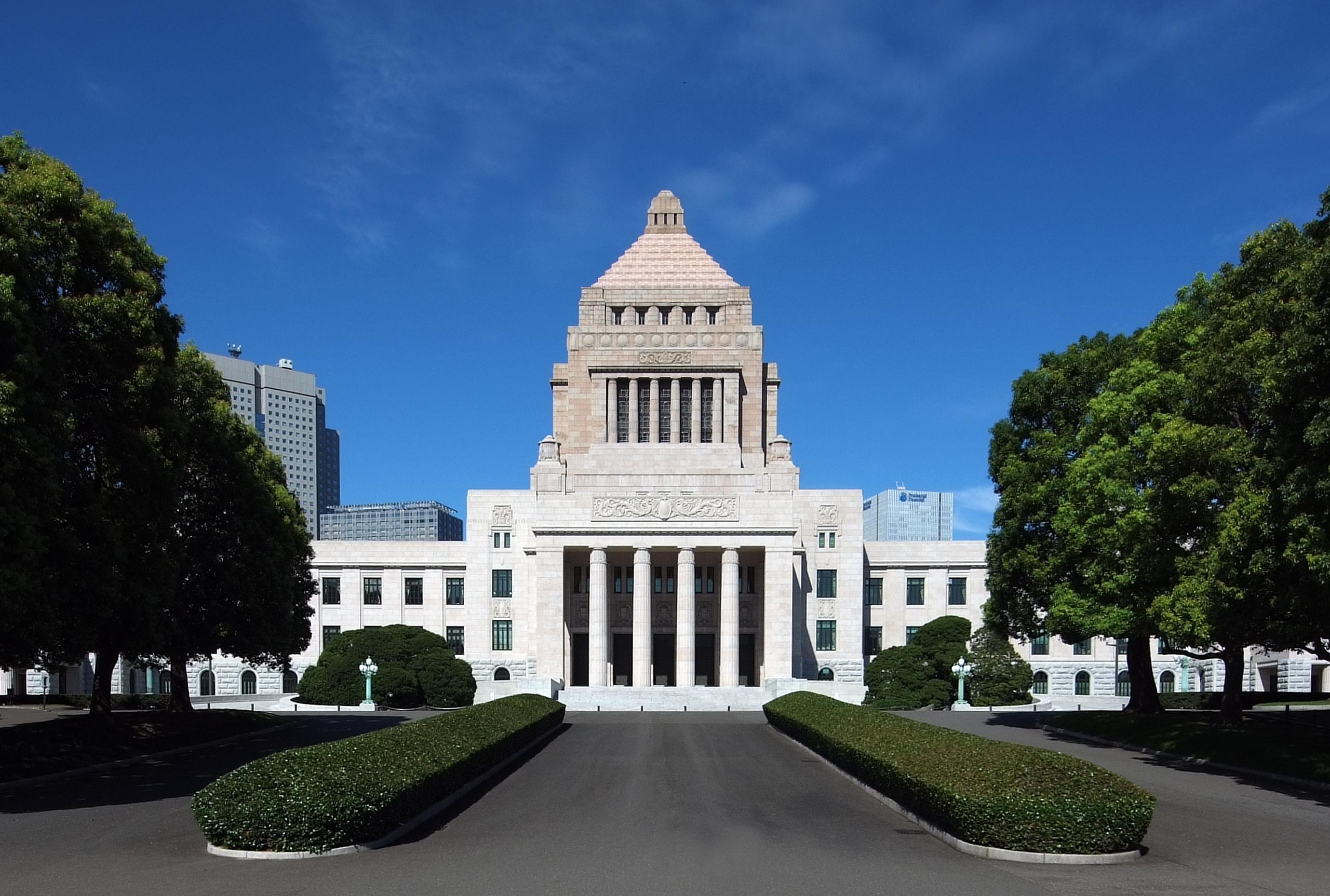
National Diet Building

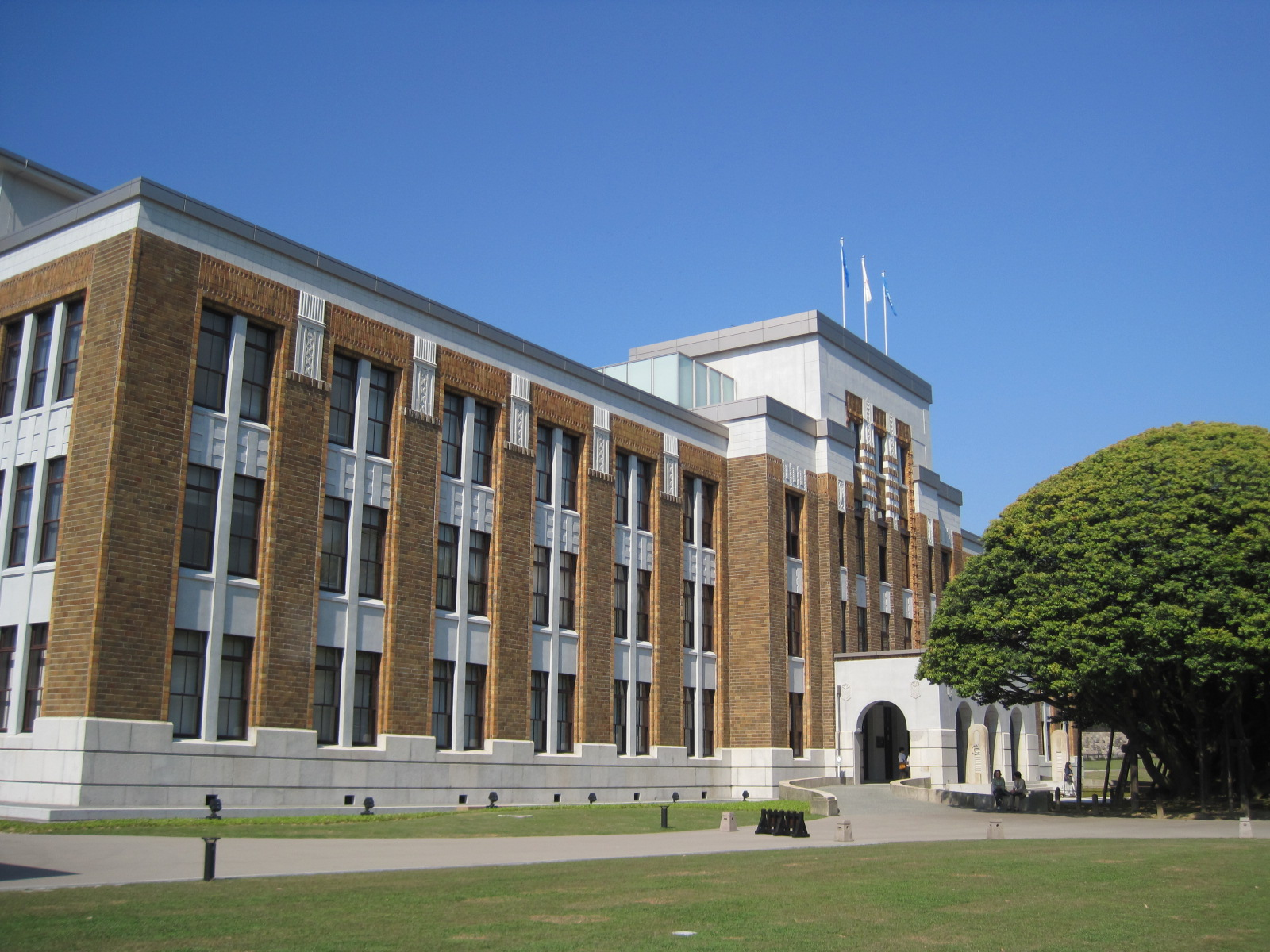
Ishikawa Prefectural Government Office (2nd generation)

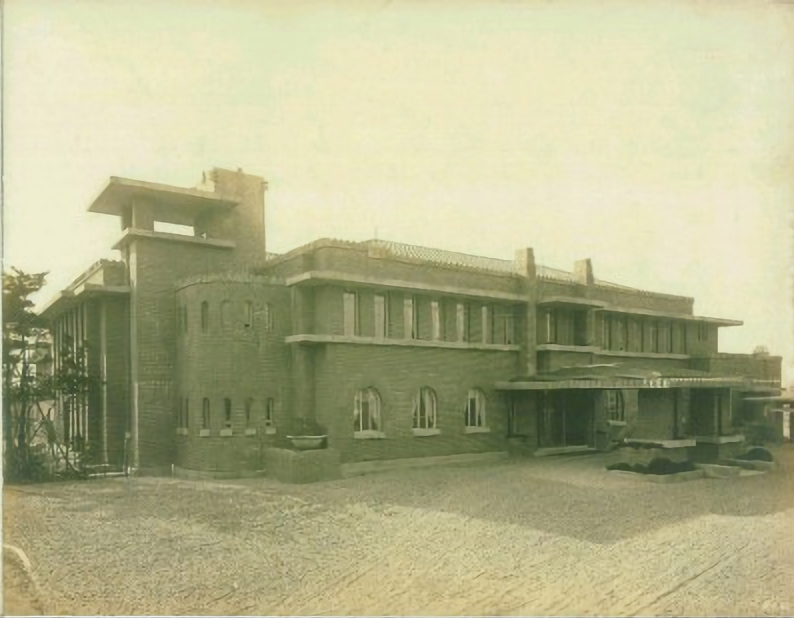
The first Kantei (The Office and Residence of Japanese Prime Minister) at its completion, March 1929

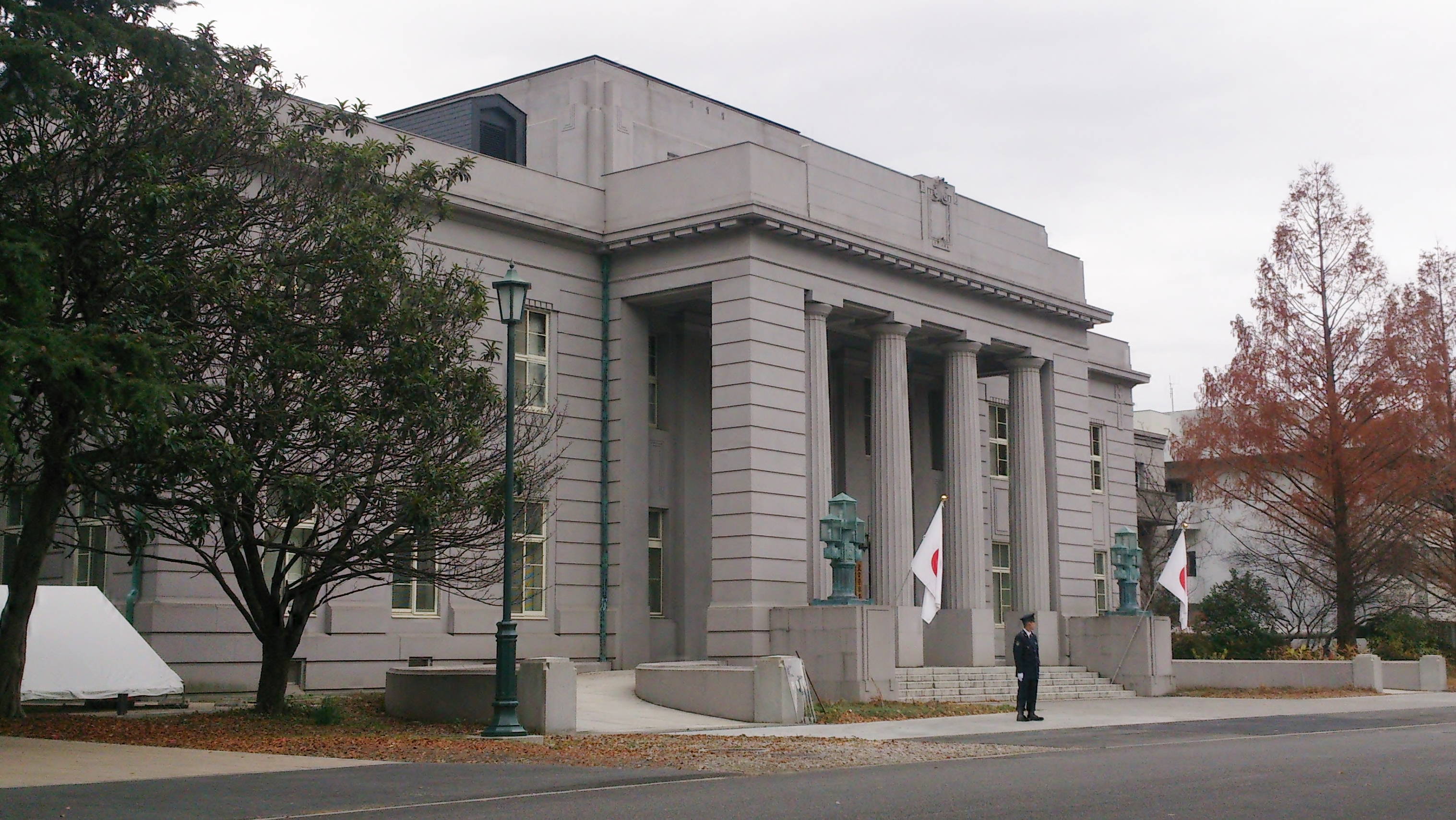
Imperial Guard Headquarters Government Buildings

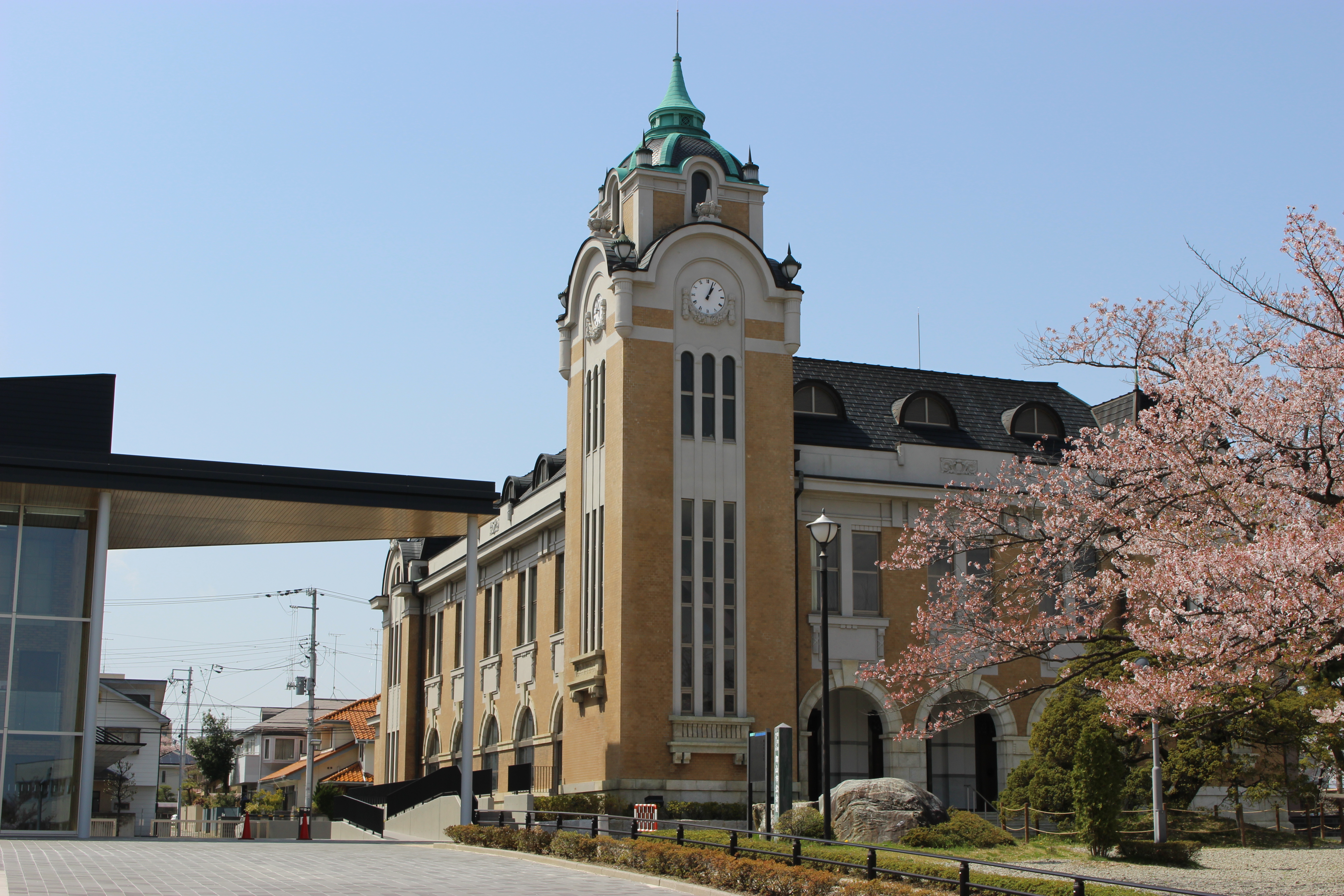
Koriyama Public Hall

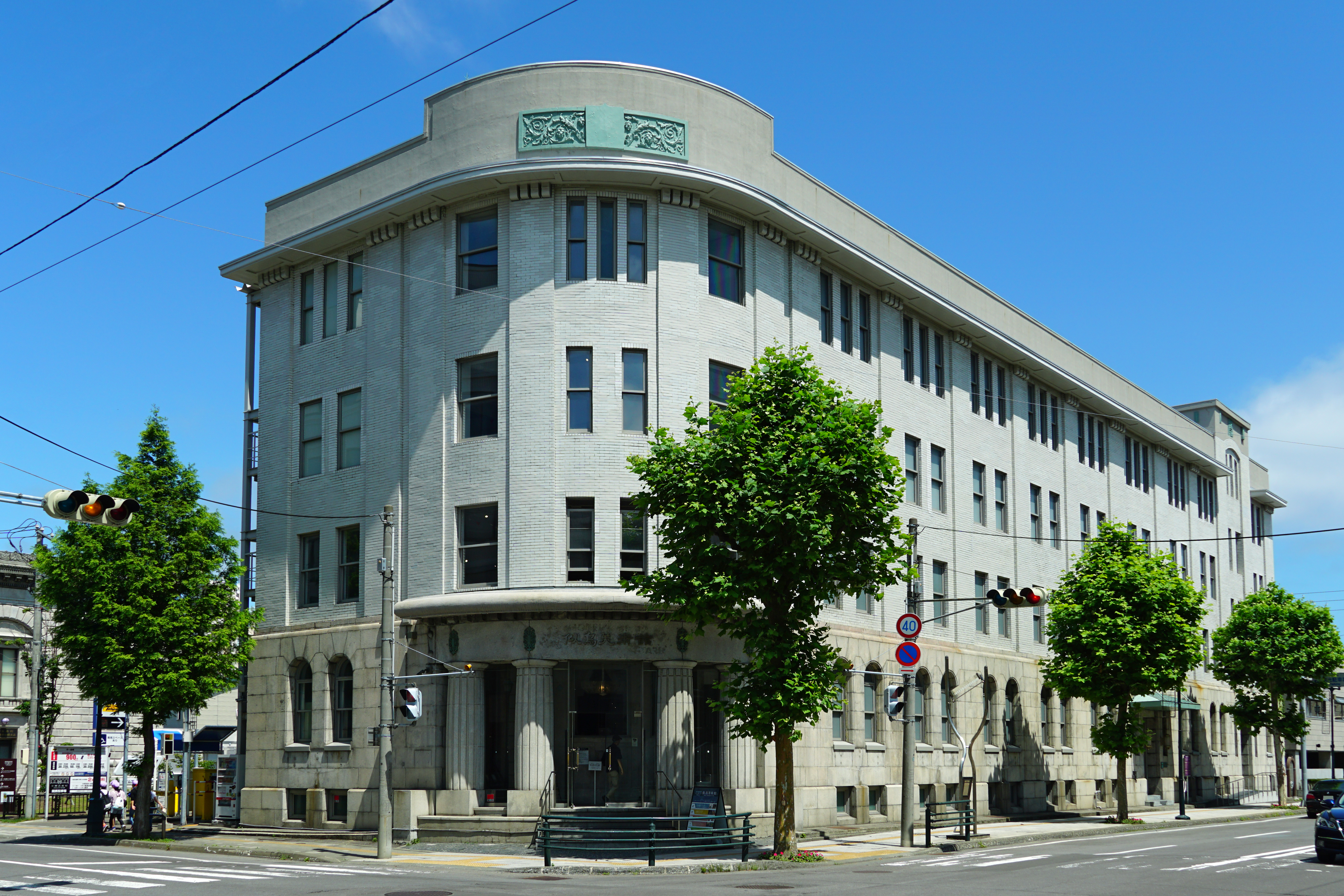
Former Hokkaido Takushoku Bank Otaru Branch

== See also ==
- List of University of Tokyo people
- Japanese architecture
- List of Japanese architects#Pre Meiji period, Meiji period (1868–1911), Taishō Period (1912–1925), Shōwa Period (1926–1945)
