= Takao Umemoto =

Japanese psychologist

- Born: Kyoto, Japan
- Education: Kyoto University
- Known for: Research on absolute pitch, schema creation in cognitive music research, founding the Association of Music Perception and Cognition in Japan
- Scientific career
- Fields: Music psychology
- Workplaces: Kyoto University, Konan Women's University

Takao Umemoto was a Japanese psychologist whose specific interest was music psychology; he was also an academic, and pianist.

== Early life ==
Umemoto was born and raised in Kyoto, Japan (Osaka, 2003). Umemoto's father was a professor in psychology and a practicing Buddhist monk at Higashi-Honganji temple. He valued music and pressed Umemoto to dedicate his youth to music and playing piano. This would later influence his career, inspiring the topics of his research and lectures. He would continue to play piano till his death (Osaka, 2003).

== Education ==
Umemoto graduated from Kyoto University in 1948, continued through graduate school, and graduated in 1952. Umemoto earned his Ph.D. in 1966 from Kyoto University (Koyasu, 2002). The beginning of his career and his early experiments aligned with the direct growth and attention on perception and cognition, present in Japan, after he earned his Ph.D.(Imada et al., 2016).

== Career ==
Umemoto was a lecturer in the department of educational psychology at Kyoto University in Japan before becoming associate professor at the faculty of education at Kyoto University (Osaka, 2003). Umemoto became a professor at Konan Women's University in the 1980s after retiring from Kyoto University, he lectured on music psychology (Osaka, 2003). The boom in women entering universities and fields of science made Umemoto's lecturers at Konan influential. Konan Women's University took part in supporting the 20% increase in Japanese Psychological Association along with other progressive (for the 1980s) universities (Imada et al., 2016).

Umemoto worked on creating valid tests and measures in music psychology. He is known for his research on absolute pitch and the creation of schema used in cognitive music research (Osaka, 2002). Much like early psychologists attempting to measure and explore their ideologies and theories, Takao did the same in his research. He published one of his most famous books, ‘Music Psychology’ in 1966 (Osaka, 2003). Umemoto wrote more than 160 articles and published 4 books over his career (Osaka, 2003). Umemoto served as Dean of Kyoto University from 1976 to 1977 (Koyasu, 2002). He initiated the creation of the Association of Music Perception and Cognition in Japan (Osaka, 2003). Due to the positive response to the association, characterized by increase in members and public interest, he organized the first international conference on the subject (Koyasu, 2002).
