= Kunie Miyaji =

Japanese physician

Kunie Miyaji (born 1891) was a pioneering woman physician in Japan.

== Life ==
Kunie Miyaji was born 1 March 1891 in Suzaki, Kōchi Prefecture. She was educated at high school in Kochi and at boarding school, graduating 1909. She then studied at Tokyo Women's Medical School, graduating in 1914 but staying there for two more years training in gynecology. From 1916 to 1919 she practiced medicine in Burma. Returning home, she married Katsuro Miyaji and did further gynecological study at Kyushu University. She opened a practice and built a medical hospital in her home town of Kochi. She helped form the Japanese Women's Medical Association. She returned to study in the late 1930s, gaining a PhD from Tokyo Imperial University School of Medicine in 1945.
