= Shinrokuro Miyoshi =

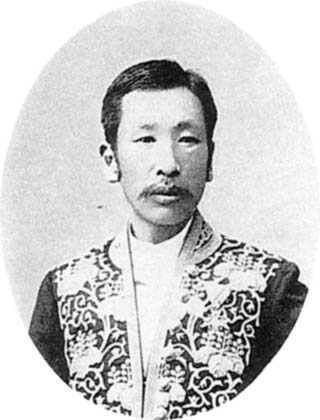
Shinrokuro Miyoshi, Professor of Naval Architecture

Shinrokuro Miyoshi (三好 晋六郎, Miyoshi Shinrokurō; September 9, 1856 - January 28, 1910) was a professor of shipbuilding.

He graduated from Imperial College of Engineering (工部大学校, Kōbu daigakkō), and studied in England. In 1882, the shipbuilding department (造船学科, Zōsen gakka) was established. He was installed as an adjunct professor and lectured in the shipbuilding department. The next year he was installed as a professor. In 1887 he established the Tsukiji Technic School (築地工手学校, Tsukiji kō-shukō gakkō).
