= Takashi Kawamura (businessman) =

Director and Chairman of TEPCO in Japan

Chairman at Hitachi
- In office 2009–2013
- Preceded by: Etsuhiko Shoyama
- Succeeded by: Hiroaki Nakanishi

9th President of Hitachi
- In office 2009–2010
- Preceded by: Kazuo Furukawa
- Succeeded by: Hiroaki Nakanishi

Personal details
- Born: December 19, 1939 (age 86) Hakodate, Hokkaido, Japan
- Education: University of Tokyo
- Occupation: Businessman, electrical engineer

Takashi Kawamura (川村隆, Kawamura Takashi; born December 19, 1939) ComIH is a director and the chairman of Tokyo Electric Power Company Holdings, Inc. (TEPCO), a semi-nationalized electric utility company, and the former chairman and president of Hitachi, Ltd., the Japanese multinational electronics and engineering conglomerate. He had worked at Hitachi for his entire business career and retired as senior adviser to the company in June 2016. On request of the Japanese government, Kawamura has served as chairman of the electric power company since June 2017, after it was found responsible for the Fukushima Daiichi nuclear disaster.

== Education ==
Kawamura attended the University of Tokyo, receiving a bachelor's degree in electrical engineering in 1962.

== Business career ==
Kawamura joined Hitachi in 1962. He rose up through the ranks, becoming general manager of the Hitachi Works (turbine and electric generator factory in Hitachi, Ibaraki) in 1992, executive of the Electric Utility Sales Operations Group in 1995, managing director of the Power Group in 1997, and vice president in 1999. From 2003 to 2007, he served as Representative Executive Officer of Hitachi Solutions. In 2005, he became chairman of Hitachi Plant Engineering & Construction and Hitachi Maxell.

In 2009, he became president of the company. He served for one year until he was replaced by Hiroaki Nakanishi. He was then made chairman of the board of directors. As chairman, he hired many outside directors, making it the first board in Hitachi's history to have more outside directors than Hitachi insiders.

He has also served as the chairman of the Institute of Electrical Engineers of Japan (2004), chairman of the Communications and Information Network Association of Japan (2010), and vice chairman of the Japan Business Federation (2010).

== Honours ==
- Commander of the Order of Prince Henry, Portugal (21 January 2014)

== See also ==
- All Nippon Airways Flight 61 — Kawamura was one of 503 passengers on board the flight.

Business positions
Preceded by Etsuhiko Shoyama	Chairman of Hitachi; 2009-2013	Succeeded by Hiroaki Nakanishi
Preceded by Kazuo Furukawa	President of Hitachi; 2009-2010	Succeeded by Hiroaki Nakanishi
