= Da-Wen Sun =

Chinese food engineer

Da-Wen Sun 孫大文
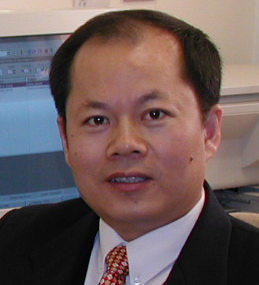
- Da-Wen Sun
- Born: Chaozhou, China
- Occupations: Professor, Food Engineer

Sun Dawen (simplified Chinese: 孙大文; traditional Chinese: 孫大文; pinyin: Sūn Dàwén; Jyutping: Syun1 Daai6 Man6; ), known as Da-Wen Sun, is a Chinese-born professor who studies food engineering at University College Dublin.

Professor Sun is an Academician of six academies including Royal Irish Academy, Academia Europaea (The Academy of Europe), Polish Academy of Sciences, International Academy of Food Science and Technology, International Academy of Agricultural and Biosystems Engineering and International Academy of Refrigeration. He is also President of International Commission of Agricultural and Biosystems Engineering (CIGR).

== Biography ==
Sun was born in Chaozhou, Guangdong, China. He received a first class BSc Honours and MSc in Mechanical Engineering, and a PhD in Chemical Engineering in China. He was appointed College Lecturer at National University of Ireland, Dublin (University College Dublin) in 1995, and was then senior lecturer, associate professor and full Professor. Sun is now Professor and Director of the Food Refrigeration and Computerised Food Technology Research Group in University College Dublin.

He is Editor-in-Chief of Food and Bioprocess Technology – an International Journal (Springer), Series Editor of Contemporary Food Engineering book series (CRC Press / Taylor & Francis), former Editor of Journal of Food Engineering (Elsevier), and editorial board member for a number of international journals. He is also a Chartered Engineer.

== Academic career ==
Sun's academic work is in the area of food engineering research and education. His main research activities include cooling, drying and refrigeration processes and systems, quality and safety of food products, bioprocess simulation and optimisation, and computer vision technology. He has studied on vacuum cooling of cooked meats, pizza quality inspection by computer vision, and edible films for shelf-life extension of fruit and vegetables.

He is the most cited author of several food science journals such as Lebensmittel-Wissenschaft & Technologie, Journal of Food Engineering, Trends in Food Science and Technology, Food and Bioprocess Technology, and Innovative Food Science and Emerging Technologies.

== Honours and awards ==
Sun has also received numerous awards, which include:

- Honorary Doctorate Degree from the Universidad Privada del Norte (UPN) in Peru, 2018
- Full Member (Academician) of International Academy of Refrigeration, 2018
- Fellow of International Academy of Agricultural and Biosystems Engineering (iAABE), 2016
- Fellow of International Academy of Food Science and Technology, 2012
- Foreign Member of Polish Academy of Sciences, 2017
- Member of Academia Europaea (The Academy of Europe), 2011
- Member of Royal Irish Academy, 2010
- CIGR Fellow Award, 2010, by CIGR (International Commission of Agricultural and Biosystems Engineering – formerly International Commission of Agricultural Engineering)
- Fellow of Institution of Engineers of Ireland (Engineers Ireland), 2009
- CIGR Recognition Award, 2008, by CIGR (International Commission of Agricultural Engineering)
- AFST(I) Fellow Award, 2007, by Association of Food Scientists and Technologists (India)
- CIGR Merit Award, 2006, by CIGR (International Commission of Agricultural Engineering)
- Food Engineer of the Year Award, 2004, by The Institution of Mechanical Engineers, UK
- CIGR Merit Award, 2000, by CIGR (International Commission of Agricultural Engineering)
