= William Stout (disambiguation) =

William Stout (born 1949) is an American artist.

William Stout may also refer to:

- William Stout (rower) (1841–1900), British rowing champion
- William Bushnell Stout (1880–1956), known as Bill, American inventor and aviation designer
- Bill Stout (William Job Stout, 1927–1989), American broadcast journalist
- Bill Stout, 1999–2000 president of the International Commission of Agricultural and Biosystems Engineering
