= Food and biological process engineering =

Application of engineering to food production and distribution

Food and biological process engineering is a discipline concerned with applying principles of engineering to the fields of food production and distribution and biology. It is a broad field, with workers fulfilling a variety of roles ranging from design of food processing equipment to genetic modification of organisms. In some respects it is a combined field, drawing from the disciplines of food science and biological engineering to improve the Earth's food supply.

Creating, processing, and storing food to support the world's population requires extensive interdisciplinary knowledge. Notably, there are many biological engineering processes within food engineering to manipulate the multitude of organisms involved in our complex food chain. Food safety in particular requires biological study to understand the microorganisms involved and how they affect humans. However, other aspects of food engineering, such as food storage and processing, also require extensive biological knowledge of both the food and the microorganisms that inhabit it. This food microbiology and biology knowledge becomes biological engineering when systems and processes are created to maintain desirable food properties and microorganisms while providing mechanisms for eliminating the unfavorable or dangerous ones.

== Concepts ==
Many different concepts are involved in the field of food and biological process engineering. Below are listed several major ones.

=== Food science ===
The science behind food and food production involves studying how food behaves and how it can be improved. Researchers analyze longevity and composition (i.e., ingredients, vitamins, minerals, etc.) of foods, as well as how to ensure food safety.

=== Genetic engineering ===
Modern food and biological process engineering relies heavily on applications of genetic manipulation. By understanding plants and animals on the molecular level, scientists are able to engineer them with specific goals in mind.

Among the most notable applications of such genetic engineering is the creation of disease or insect resistant plants, such as those modified to produce Bacillus thuringiensis, a bacterium that kills strain-specific varieties of insect upon consumption. However, insects are able to adapt to Bacillus thuringiensis strains, necessitating continued research to maintain disease-resistance.

== Food safety ==
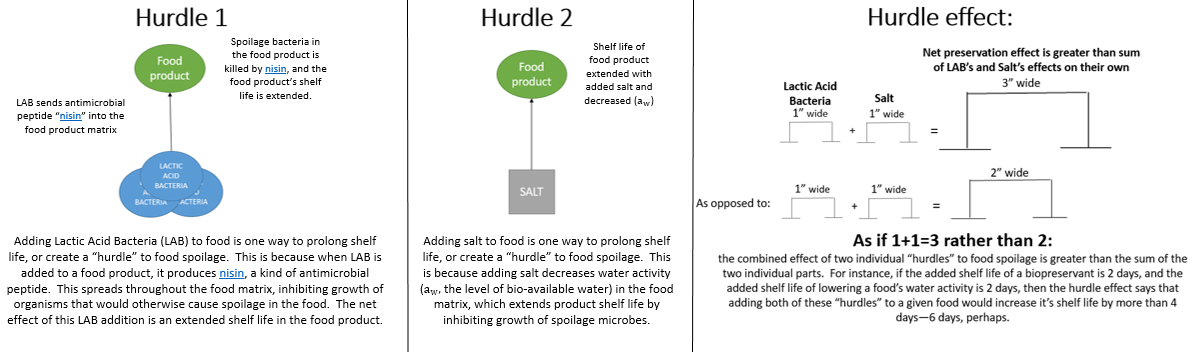
This figure illustrates the pathway of food preservation followed by lactic acid bacteria involving Nisin, as well as the pathway of food preservation followed by salt. Additionally, the hurdle effect of food preservation, such as by adding lactic acid bacteria and salt to a food product, is illustrated and described.

An important task within the realm of food safety is the elimination of microorganisms responsible for food-borne illness. Food and waterborne diseases still pose a serious health concern, with hundreds of outbreaks reported per year since 1971 in the United States alone. The risk of these diseases has risen throughout the years, mainly due to the mishandling of raw food, poor sanitation, and poor socioeconomic conditions. In addition to diseases caused by direct infection by pathogens, some food borne diseases are caused by the presence of toxins produced by microorganisms in food. There are five main types of microbial pathogens which contaminate food and water: viruses, bacteria, fungi, pathogenic protozoa and helminths.

Several bacteria, such as E. coli, Clostridium botulinum, and Salmonella enterica, are well-known and are targeted for elimination via various industrial processes. Though bacteria are often the focus of food safety processes, viruses, protozoa, and molds are also known to cause food-borne illness and are of concern when designing processes to ensure food safety. Although the goal of food safety is to eliminate harmful organisms from food and prevent food-borne illness, detecting said organisms is another important function of food safety mechanisms.

=== Monitoring and detection ===
The goal of most monitoring and detection processes is the rapid detection of harmful microorganisms with minimal interruption to the processing of food products. An example of a detection mechanism that relies heavily on biological processes is usage of chromogenic microbiological media.

==== Chromogenic microbiological media ====
Chromogenic microbiological media use colored enzymes to detect the presence of certain bacteria. In conventional bacteria culturing, bacteria are allowed to grow on a medium that supports many strains. Since it is hard to isolate bacteria, many cultures of different bacteria are able to form. To identify a particular bacteria culture, scientists must identify it using only its physical characteristics. Then further tests can be performed to confirm the presence of the bacteria, such as serology tests that find antibodies formed in organisms as a response to infection. In contrast, chromogenic microbiological media use particular color-producing enzymes that are targeted for metabolism by a certain strain of bacteria. Thus, if the given cultures are present, the media will become colored accordingly as the bacteria metabolize the color-producing enzyme. This greatly facilitates the identification of certain bacteria cultures and can eliminate need for further testing. To guard against misidentification of bacteria, the chromogenic plates typically incorporate additional enzymes that will be processed by other bacteria. Now, as the non-target bacteria interact with the additional enzymes, they will produce colors that distinguish them from the target bacteria.

=== Mechanisms ===
Food safety has been practiced for thousands of years, but with the rise of heavily industrial agriculture, the demand for food safety has steadily increased, prompting more research into the ways to achieve greater food safety. A primary mechanism that will be discussed in this article is heating of food products to kill microorganisms, as this has a millennia-long history and is still extensively used. However, more recent mechanisms have been created such as application of ultraviolet light, high pressure, electric field, cold plasma, usage of ozone, and irradiation of food.

==== Heating ====
A report given to the Food and Drug Administration by the Institute of Food Technologists thoroughly discusses the thermal processing of food. A notable step in development of heat application to food processing is pasteurization, developed by Louis Pasteur in the nineteenth century. Pasteurization is used to kill microorganisms that could pose risks to consumers or shorten the shelf life of food products. Primarily applied to liquid food products, pasteurization is regularly applied to fruit juice, beer, milk, and ice cream. Heat applied during pasteurization varies from around 60 °C to kill bacteria to around 80 °C to kill yeasts. Most pasteurization processes have been optimized recently to involve several steps of heating at various temperatures and minimize the time needed for the process.

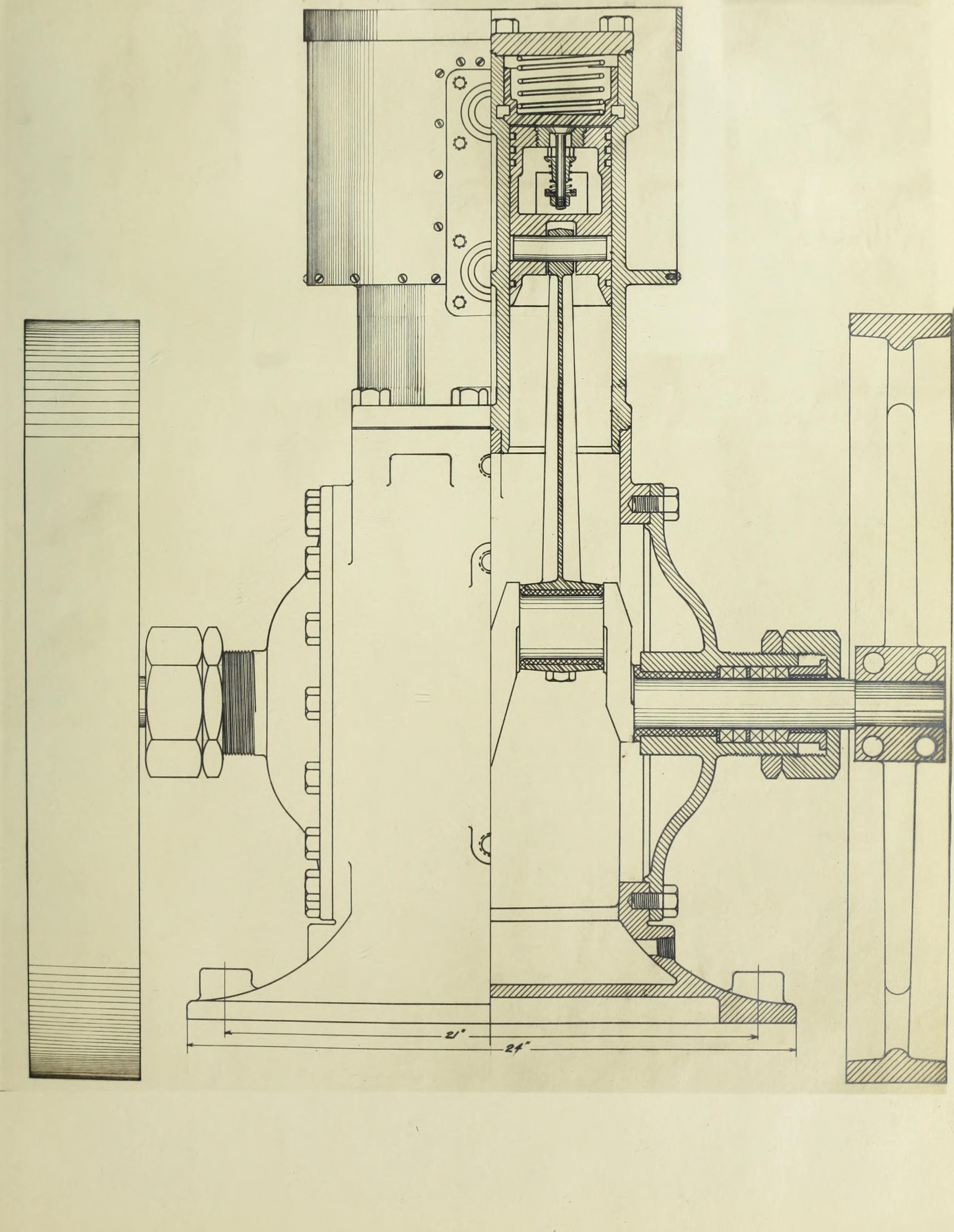
Basic drawing of an ammonia compressor. Ammonia compressors are used in many factories to cool food products.

A more severe food heating mechanism is thermal sterilization. While pasteurization destroys most bacteria and yeast growing in food products, the goal of sterilization is to kill almost all viable organisms found in food products including yeast, mold, bacteria, and spore forming organisms. Done properly, this process will greatly extend the shelf life of food products and can allow them to be stored at room temperature. As detailed in The Handbook of Food Preservation, thermal sterilization typically involves four steps. First, food products are heated to between 110 and 125 °C, and the products are given time for the heat to travel through the material completely. After this, the temperature must be maintained long enough to kill microorganisms before the food product is cooled to prevent cooking. In practice, though complete sterility of food products could be achieved, the intense and extended heating needed to accomplish this could reduce the nutritive value of the food products, thus, only a partial sterilization is performed.

==== Low-temperature process ====
Low-temperature processing also plays an essential role in food processing and storage. During this process, microorganisms and enzymes are subjected to low temperatures. Unlike heating, chilling does not destroy the enzymes and microorganisms but simply reduces their activity, which is effective as long as the temperature is maintained. As the temperature is raised, activity will rise again accordingly. It follows that, unlike heating, the effect of preservation by cold is not permanent; hence the importance of maintaining the cold chain throughout the shelf life of the food product.

There are two distinct low temperature processes: chilling and freezing. Chilling is the application of temperatures within the range of 0-8 °C, while freezing is usually below 18 °C. Refrigeration does slow spoilage in food and reduce the risk of bacterial growth, however, it does not improve the quality of the product.

==== Irradiation ====
Food irradiation is another notable biological engineering process to achieve food safety. Research into the potential utilization of ionizing irradiation for food preservation started in the 1940s as an extension of studies on the effect of radiation on living cells. The FDA approved usage of ionizing radiation on food products in 1990. This radiation removes electrons from atoms, and these electrons go on to damage the DNA of microorganisms living in the food, killing the microorganisms. Irradiation can be used to pasteurize food products, such as seafood, poultry, and red meat, thus making these food products safer for consumers. Some irradiation is also used to delay fruit ripening processes, which can kill microorganisms that accelerate the ripening and spoilage of produce. Low dosages of radiation can also be used to kill insects living in harvested crops, as the radiation will stunt the insects' development at various stages and damage their ability to reproduce.

== Food storage and preservation ==
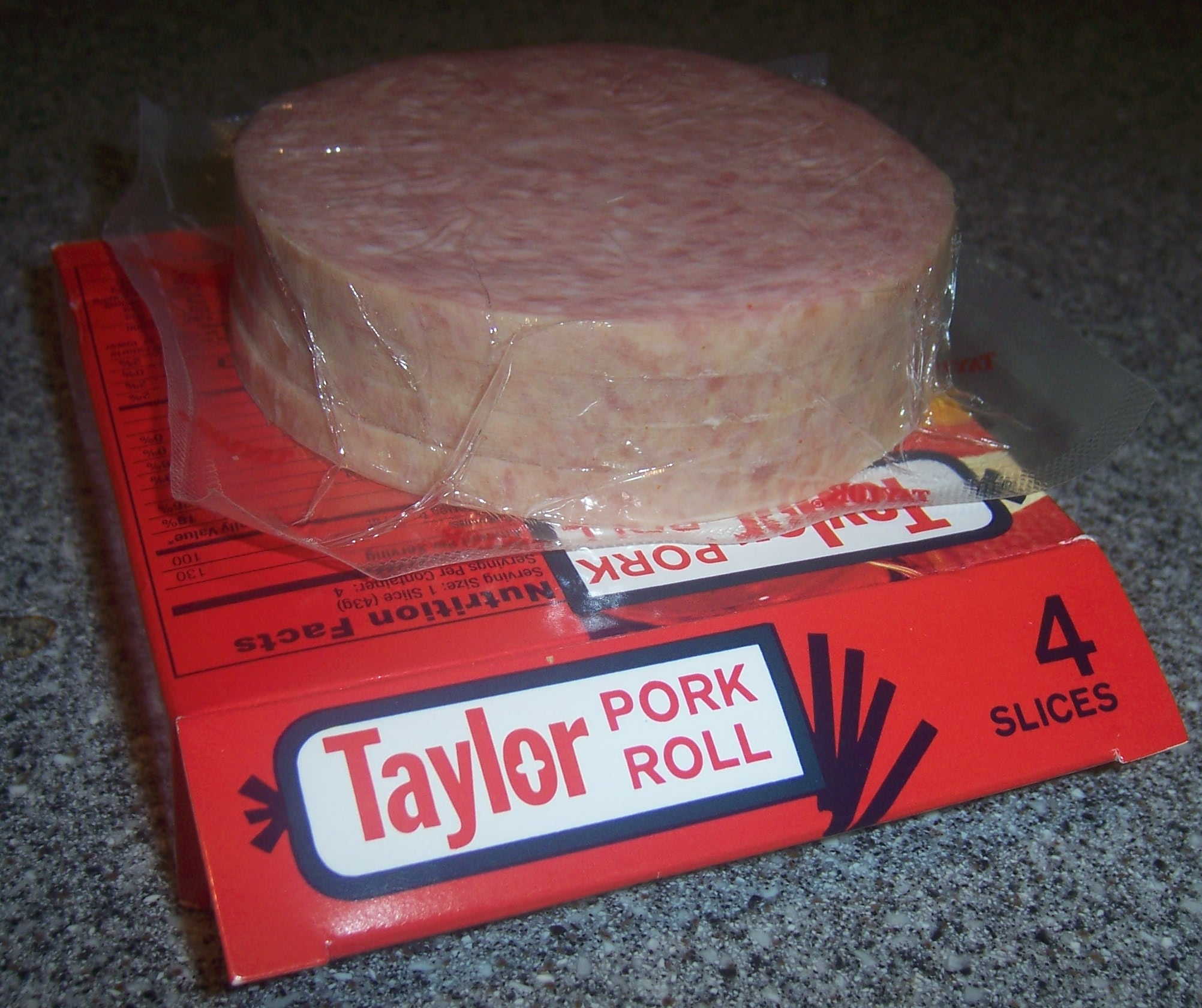
Meat that has been gas flushed; a technique used for modified atmosphere packaging.

Food storage and preservation is a key component of food engineering processes and relies heavily on biological engineering to understand and manipulate the organisms involved. Note that the above food safety processes such as pasteurization and sterilization destroy the microorganisms that also contribute to deterioration of food products while not necessarily posing a risk to people. Understanding of these processes, their effects, and the microorganisms at play in various food processing techniques is a very important biological engineering task within food engineering. Factories and processes must be created to ensure that food products can be processed in an efficient and effective manner, which again relies heavily on biological engineering expertise.

=== Produce ===
Preservation and processing of fresh produce poses many biological engineering challenges. Understanding of biology is particularly important to processing produce because most fruits and vegetables are living organisms from the time of harvest to the time of consumption. Before harvesting, understanding of plant ontogeny, or origin and development, and the manipulation of these developmental processes are key components of the industrial agriculture process. Understanding of plant developmental cycles governs how and when plants are harvested, impacts storage environments, and contributes to creating intervention processes. Even after harvesting, fruits and vegetables undergo the biological processes of respiration, transpiration, and ripening. Control over these natural plant processes should be achieved to prevent food spoilage, sprouting or growth of produce during storage, and reduction in quality or desirability, such as through wilting or loss of desirable texture.

=== Technology ===
When considering food storage and preservation, the technologies of modified atmosphere and controlled atmosphere are widely used for the storage and packing of several types of foods. They offer several advantages such as delay of ripening and senescence of horticultural commodities, control of some biological processes such as rancidity, insects, bacteria and decay, among others. Controlled atmosphere (CA) storage refers to atmospheres that are different than normal air and strictly controlled at all times. This type of storage manipulates the CO_{2} and O_{2} levels within airtight stores of containers. Modified atmosphere (MA) storage refers to any atmosphere different from normal air, typically made by mixing CO_{2}, O_{2}, and N_{2.}

== Waste management ==
Another biological engineering process within food engineering involves the processing of agricultural waste. Though it may fall more within the realm of environmental engineering, understanding how organisms in the environment will respond to the waste products is important for assessing the impact of the processes and comparing waste processing strategies. It is also important to understand which organisms are involved in the decomposition of the waste products, and the byproducts that will be produced as a result of their activity.

To discuss direct application of biological engineering, biological waste processing techniques are used to process organic waste and sometimes create useful byproducts. There are two main processes by which organic matter is processed via microbes: aerobic processes and anaerobic processes. These processes convert organic matter to cell mass through synthesis processes of microorganisms. Aerobic processes occur in the presence of oxygen, take organic matter as input, and produce water, carbon dioxide, nitrate, and new cell mass. Anaerobic processes occur in the absence of oxygen and produce less cell mass than aerobic processes. An additional benefit of anaerobic processes is that they also generate methane, which can be burned as a fuel source. Design of both aerobic and anaerobic biological waste processing plants requires careful control of temperature, humidity, oxygen concentration, and the waste products involved. Understanding of all aspects of the system and how they interact with one another is important for developing efficient waste management plants and falls within the realm of biological engineering.

== See also ==
- Biological engineering
- Food science
- Genetically modified organism
- Genetically modified food
- Genetically modified crops
