= International Commission of Agricultural and Biosystems Engineering =

International scientific organization

International Commission of Agricultural and Biosystems Engineering – CIGR (Commission Internationale du Genie Rural) founded in 1930 in Liège, Belgium, is "an international, non-governmental, non-profit organization consisting of a network of Regional and National Societies of Agricultural Engineering as well as private and public companies and individuals worldwide", the largest and highest international institution in the field. Until 2008, the organisation was known as International Commission of Agricultural Engineering. Its membership includes American Society of Agricultural and Biological Engineers (ASABE), Asian Association for Agricultural Engineering (AAAE), European Society of Agricultural Engineers (EurAgEng), Latin American and Caribbean Association of Agricultural Engineering (ALIA), South and East African Society of Agricultural Engineering (SEASAE), Euro Asian Association of Agricultural Engineers (EAAAE), Association of Agricultural Engineers of South-Eastern Europe (AAESEE), and many national societies.

== Structure ==
The structure of CIGR is divided into seven technical Sections and various working groups. Technical sections promote and develop their respective fields as they relate to agricultural engineering. The Executive Board appoints working groups to "carry out studies on specific subjects of international importance and interest."

- CIGR Technical Sections:
  - Section I: Land and Water
  - Section II: Structures and Environment
  - Section III: Plant Production
  - Section IV: Energy in Agriculture
  - Section V: System Management
  - Section VI: Bioprocesses
  - Section VII: Information Technology
- CIGR Working Groups:
  - WG1 Animal Housing in Hot Climate
  - WG2 – Cattle Housing
  - WG3 – Agricultural Engineering University Curricula Harmonization
  - WG4 – Rural Landscape Protection and Valorisation
  - WG5 – Image Analysis for Agricultural Processes and Products
  - WG6 – Food Safety
  - WG7 – Logistics
  - WG8 – Precision Aerial Application
  - WG9 – Plant Factory and Intelligent Greenhouse
  - WG10 – Functional Wellness Foods and Nutrition
  - WG11 – Rural Development and Preservation of Cultural Heritage
  - WG12 – Artificial Intelligence and Data Science
  - WG13 – Circular Bioeconomy

== Journal ==
CIGR publishes a journal, the Agricultural Engineering International: CIGR Journal. In 2021, the journal had an impact factor of 0.484. It has a SCImago Journal Rank of 0.191 as of 2023. This rank placed it in the third quartile in the "Industrial and Manufacturing Engineering" and "Automotive Engineering" categories and the fourth quartile in the "Agronomy and Crop Science" and "Energy (miscellaneous)" categories. It had an h-index of 28.

== World Congresses ==
CIGR has held the following World Congresses:

Year	City	Country
1930	Liege	Belgium
1936	Madrid	Spain
~~1940~~	~~Rome~~	~~Italy~~ (cancelled)
1951	Rome	Italy
1958	Brussels	Belgium
1964	Lausanne	Switzerland
1969	Baden-Baden	West Germany
1974	Flevohof	Netherlands
1979	East Lansing	United States
1984	Budapest	Hungary
1989	Dublin	Ireland
1994	Milan	Italy
1998	Rabat	Morocco
2000	Tsukuba	Japan
2002	Chicago	United States
2006	Bonn	Germany
2010	Quebec City	Canada
2014	Beijing	China
2018	Antalya	Turkey
2022	Kyoto	Japan
2026	Turin	Italy

== Conferences ==
Every four years, CIGR holds the world's largest agricultural technology conference, the CIGR International Conference. The conference years and locations are as follows:

Year	City	Country
2004	Beijing	China
2008	Foz do Iguaçu	Brazil
2012	Valencia	Spain
2016	Aarhus	Spain
2021	Quebec City	Canada
2021	Jeju Island	South Korea

== Presidents ==
The following have been organization presidents:

- 1930–1950 Prof. Georges Bouckaert (Belgium)
- 1950–1962 Prof. Armand Blanc (France)
- 1963–1967 Prof. Eladio Aranda Heredia (Spain)
- 1967–1969 Honorary Doctor Pierre Regamey (Switzerland)
- 1969–1974 Prof. Karel Petit (Belgium)
- 1974–1979 Mr. Fiepko Coolman (Netherlands)
- 1979–1980 Mr. Talcott W. Edminster (United States)
- 1985–1989 Prof. László Lehoczky (Hungary)
- 1989–1991 Prof. Paul McNulty (Ireland)
- 1991–1994 Prof. Giuseppe Pellizzi (Italy)
- 1995–1996 Prof. Egil Berge (Norway)
- 1997–1998 Prof. Osamu Kitani (Japan)
- 1999–2000 Prof. Bill Stout (United States)
- 2001–2002 Prof. El Houssine Bartali (Morocco)
- 2003–2004 Prof. Axel Munack (Germany)
- 2005–2006 Prof. Luis Santos Pereira (Portugal)
- 2007–2008 Prof. Irenilza de Alencar Naas (Brazil))
- 2009–2010 Prof. Søren Pedersen (Denmark)
- 2011–2012 Prof. Fedro Zazueta (United States)
- 2013–2014 Prof. Da-Wen Sun (Ireland)
- 2015–2016 Prof. Tadeusz Juliszewski Poland
- 2016–2018 Prof. Zhi Chen (China)
- 2019–2020 Prof. Linus Opara (South Africa)
- 2021–2022 Prof. Remigio Berruto (Italy)
- 2023–2024 Prof. Seishi Ninomiya (Japan)

== iAABE ==
The International Academy of Agricultural and Biosystems Engineering was founded during the 2014 World Congress primarily to recognize outstanding individuals within the field. The academy gives the title of Fellow of iAABE (previously CIGR Fellow).

== See also ==
- Agricultural engineering
- Engineering
- Food engineering
- Food and Bioprocess Technology
