= Food chemistry =

Study of chemical processes in food

Food chemistry is the study of chemical processes and interactions of all biological and non-biological components of foods. The biological substances include such items as meat, poultry, lettuce, beer, and milk as examples. It is similar to biochemistry in its main components such as carbohydrates, lipids, and protein, but it also includes substances such as water, vitamins, minerals, enzymes, food additives, flavors, and colors. This discipline also encompasses how products change under certain food processing techniques and ways either to enhance or to prevent those changes from happening. An example of enhancing a process would be to encourage fermentation of dairy products with microorganisms that convert lactose to lactic acid; an example of preventing a process would be stopping the browning on the surface of freshly cut apples using lemon juice or other acidulated water.

== History of food chemistry ==
The scientific approach to food and nutrition arose with attention to agricultural chemistry in the works of J. G. Wallerius, Humphry Davy, and others. For example, Davy published Elements of Agricultural Chemistry, in a Course of Lectures for the Board of Agriculture (1813) in the United Kingdom which would serve as a foundation for the profession worldwide, going into a fifth edition. Earlier work included that by Carl Wilhelm Scheele, who isolated malic acid from apples in 1785.

Some of the findings of Liebig on food chemistry were translated and published by Eben Horsford in Lowell Massachusetts in 1848.

In 1874 the Society of Public Analysts was formed, with the aim of applying analytical methods to the benefit of the public. Its early experiments were based on bread, milk, and wine.

It was also out of concern for the quality of the food supply, mainly food adulteration and contamination issues that would first stem from intentional contamination to later with chemical food additives by the 1950s. The development of colleges and universities worldwide, most notably in the United States, would expand food chemistry as well as research of the dietary substances, most notably the Single-grain experiment during 1907-11. Additional research by Harvey W. Wiley at the United States Department of Agriculture during the late 19th century would play a key factor in the creation of the United States Food and Drug Administration in 1906. The American Chemical Society established its Agricultural and Food Chemistry Division in 1908 while the Institute of Food Technologists established its Food Chemistry Division in 1995.

Food chemistry concepts are often drawn from rheology, theories of transport phenomena, physical and chemical thermodynamics, chemical bonds, and interaction forces, quantum mechanics and reaction kinetics, biopolymer science, colloidal interactions, nucleation, glass transitions and freezing/disordered or noncrystalline solids, and thus has Food Physical Chemistry as a foundation area.

Recently, artificial intelligence (AI) methods are increasingly used in food chemistry to analyze food chemical data and investigate relationships between food composition and functions.Applications include predicting the properties of food molecules, identifying bioactive compounds, and designing new food ingredients and formulations.

== Water in food systems ==
A major component of food is water, which can encompass anywhere from 50% in meat products to 95% in lettuce, cabbage, and tomato products. It is also an excellent place for bacterial growth and food spoilage if it is not properly processed. One way this is measured in food is by water activity which is very important in the shelf life of many foods during processing. One of the keys to food preservation in most instances is reduce the amount of water or alter the water's characteristics to enhance shelf-life. Such methods include dehydration, freezing, and refrigeration This field encompasses the "physiochemical principles of the reactions and conversions that occur during the manufacture, handling, and storage of foods".

== Carbohydrates ==
Sucrose: ordinary table sugar and probably the most familiar carbohydrate

Comprising 75% of the biological world and 80% of all food intake for human consumption, the most common known human carbohydrate is sucrose. The simplest version of a carbohydrate is a monosaccharide which contains carbon, hydrogen, and oxygen in a 1:2:1 ratio under a general formula of C_{n}H_{2n}O_{n} where n is a minimum of 3. Glucose and fructose are examples of monosaccharides. When combined in the way that the image to the right depicts, sucrose, one of the more common sugar products found in plants, is formed.

A chain of monosaccharides form to make a polysaccharide. Such polysaccharides include pectin, dextran, agar, and xanthan. Some of these carbohydrate polysaccharides are accessible for digestion by human enzymes and mainly absorbed in the small intestine, whereas dietary fiber passes to the large intestine where some of these polysaccharides are fermented by the gastrointestinal microbiota.

Sugar content is commonly measured in degrees brix.

== Lipids ==
The term lipid comprises a diverse range of molecules and to some extent is a catchall for relatively water-insoluble or nonpolar compounds of biological origin, including waxes, fatty acids (including essential fatty acids), fatty-acid derived phospholipids, sphingolipids, glycolipids and terpenoids, such as retinoids and steroids. Some lipids are linear aliphatic molecules, while others have ring structures. Some are aromatic, while others are not. Some are flexible, while others are rigid.

Most lipids have some polar character in addition to being largely nonpolar. Generally, the bulk of their structure is nonpolar or hydrophobic ("water-fearing"), meaning that it does not interact well with polar solvents like water. Another part of their structure is polar or hydrophilic ("water-loving") and will tend to associate with polar solvents like water. This makes them amphiphilic molecules (having both hydrophobic and hydrophilic portions). In the case of cholesterol, the polar group is a mere -OH group (hydroxyl or alcohol).

Lipids in food include the oils of such grains as corn, soybean, from animal fats, and are parts of many foods such as milk, cheese, and meat. They also act as vitamin carriers.

== Food proteins ==
Proteins comprise over 50% of the dry weight of an average living cell and are very complex macromolecules. They also play a fundamental role in the structure and function of cells. Consisting mainly of carbon, nitrogen, hydrogen, oxygen, and some sulfur, they also may contain iron, copper, phosphorus, or zinc.

In food, proteins are essential for growth and survival, and requirements vary depending upon a person's age and physiology (e.g., pregnancy). Protein is commonly obtained from animal sources: eggs, milk, and meat. Nuts, grains and legumes provide vegetable sources of protein, and protein combining of vegetable sources is used to achieve complete protein nutritional quotas from vegetables.

Protein sensitivity as food allergy is detected with the ELISA test.

== Enzymes ==
Enzymes are biochemical catalysts used in converting processes from one substance to another. They are also involved in reducing the amount of time and energy required to complete a chemical process. Many aspects of the food industry use catalysts, including baking, brewing, dairy, and fruit juices, to make cheese, beer, and bread.

== Vitamins ==
Riboflavin (vitamin B_{2}), water-soluble

Vitamins are nutrients required in small amounts for essential metabolic reactions in the body. These are broken down in nutrition as either water-soluble (vitamin C) or fat-soluble (vitamin E). An adequate supply of vitamins can prevent diseases such as beriberi, anemia, and scurvy while an overdose of vitamins can produce nausea and vomiting or even death.

== Minerals ==
Dietary minerals in foods are large and diverse with many required to function while other trace elements can be hazardous if consumed in excessive amounts. Bulk minerals with a Reference Daily Intake (RDI, formerly Recommended Daily Allowance (RDA)) of more than 200 mg/day are calcium, magnesium, and potassium while important trace minerals (RDI less than 200 mg/day) are copper, iron, and zinc. These are found in many foods, but can also be taken in dietary supplements.

== Colour ==
Food colouring is added to change the colour of any food substance. It is mainly for sensory analysis purposes. It can be used to simulate the natural colour of a product as perceived by the customer, such as red dye (like FD&C Red No.40 Allura Red AC) to ketchup or to add unnatural colours to a product like Kellogg's Froot Loops. Caramel is a natural food dye; the industrial form, caramel colouring, is the most widely used food colouring and is found in foods from soft drinks to soy sauce, bread, and pickles.

== Flavours ==
Flavour in food is important in how food smells and tastes to the consumer, especially in sensory analysis. Some of these products occur naturally like salt and sugar, but flavour chemists (called a "flavourist") develop many of these flavours for food products. Such artificial flavours include methyl salicylate which creates the wintergreen odor and lactic acid which gives milk a tart taste.

== Food additives ==
Food additives are substances added to food for preserving flavours, or improving taste, look, smell and freshness. The processes are as old as adding vinegar for pickling or as an emulsifier for emulsion mixtures like mayonnaise. These are generally listed by "E number" in the European Union or GRAS ("generally recognized as safe") by the United States Food and Drug Administration.

== See also ==
- Food physical chemistry
- Dietary supplement
- Food and Bioprocess Technology (journal)
- Food Chemistry (journal)
- Food composition
- Food engineering
- Food fortification
- Food microbiology
- Food packaging
- Food preservation
- Food rheology
- Food safety
- Food science
- Food storage
- Food supplements
- Food technology
- Nutraceutical
- Nutrification (also called food enrichment or fortification)

== Bibliography ==
- Fennema, O.R., Ed. (1985). Food Chemistry - Second Edition, Revised and Expanded. New York: Marcel Dekker, Inc.
- Francis, F.J. (2000). "Harvey W. Wiley: Pioneer in Food Science and Quality." In A Century of Food Science. Chicago: Institute of Food Technologists. pp. 13–14.
- Potter, N.N. and J.H. Hotchkiss. (1995). Food Science, Fifth Edition. New York: Champman & Hall. pp. 24–68.
- U.S. Food and Drug Administration. (1993). Everything Added to Food in the United States. Boca Raton, Florida: C.K. Smoley (c/o CRC press, Inc.).
