= Food storage =

Type of storage that allows food to be eaten after time

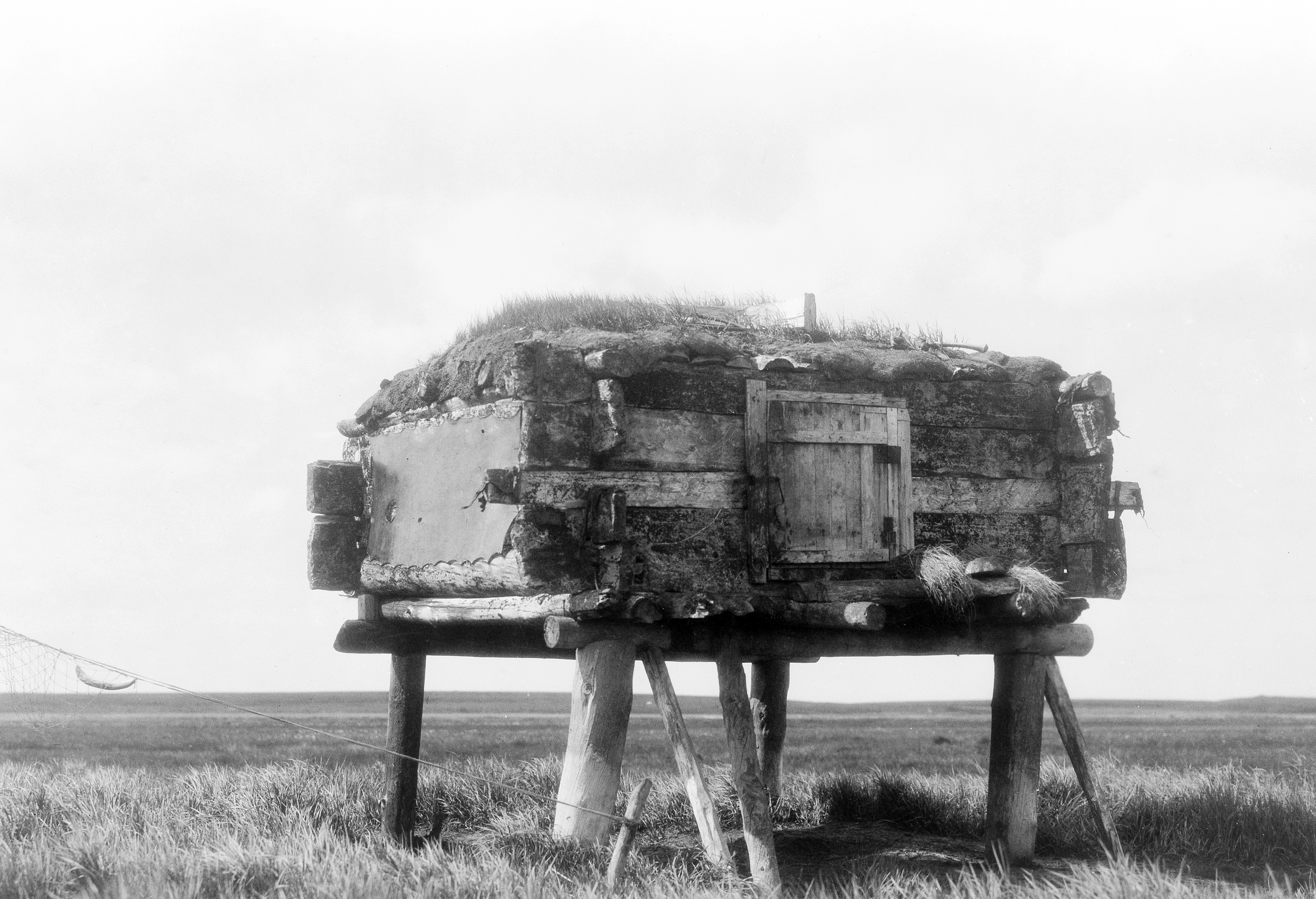
Yup'ik elevated food cache (qulvarvik), Hooper Bay, Alaska, 1929. Photograph by Edward S. Curtis

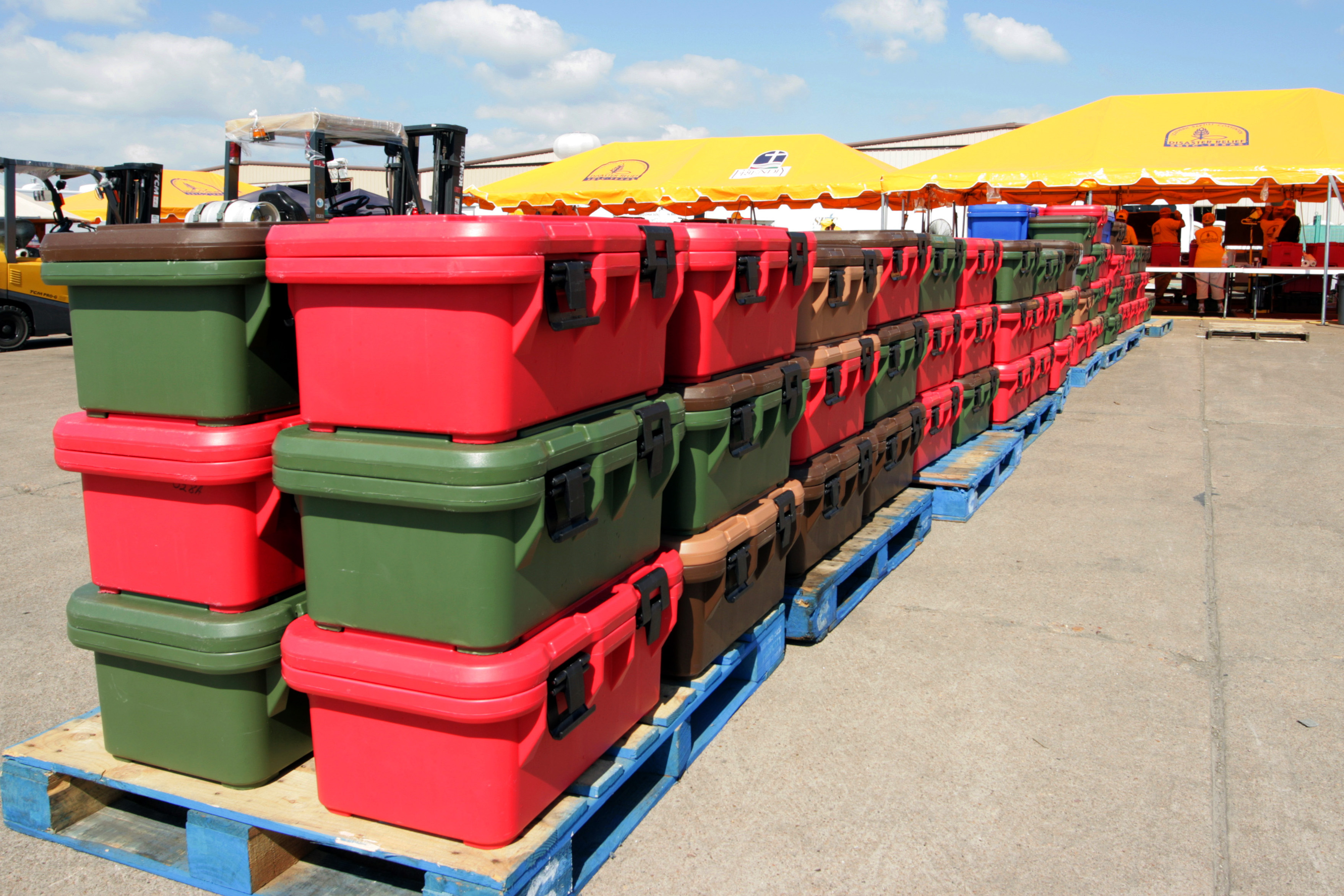
U.S. Federal Emergency Management Agency (FEMA) food storage containers stacked on shipping pallets in Texas, 2008.

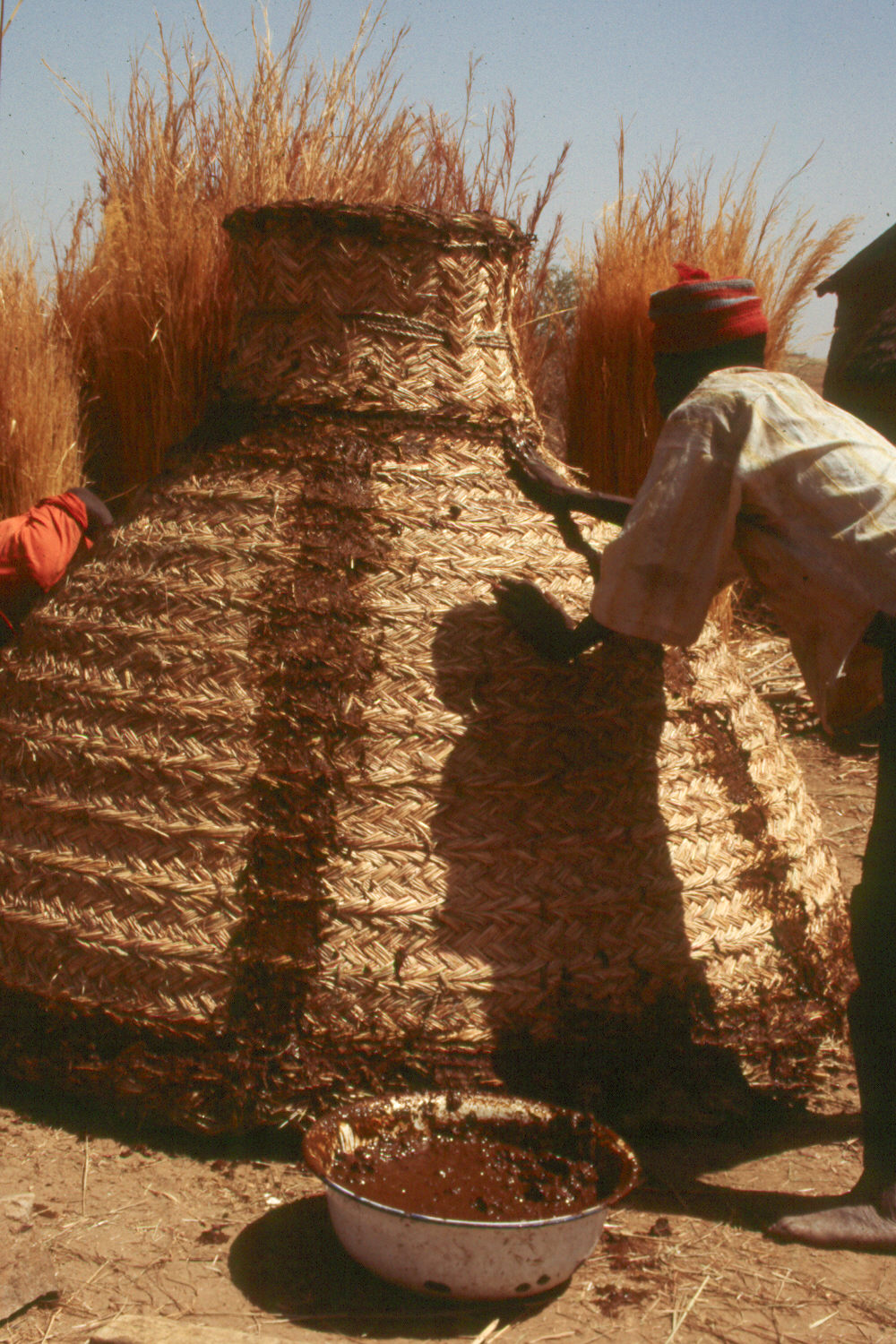
A new braided granary is inaugurated. Kapsiki, North Cameroon.

Food storage is a way of decreasing the variability of the food supply in the face of natural, inevitable variability. It allows food to be eaten for some time (typically weeks to months) after harvest rather than solely immediately. It is both a traditional domestic skill (mainly as root cellaring) and, in the form of food logistics, an important industrial and commercial activity. Food preservation, storage, and transport, including timely delivery to consumers, are important to food security, especially for the majority of people worldwide who rely on others to produce their food.

Significant food losses result from inadequate storage conditions and decisions made at earlier stages of the supply chain, thereby shortening shelf life. Adequate cold storage, in particular, can be crucial to prevent quantitative and qualitative food losses.

Food is stored by almost every human society and by many animals. Storing of food has several main purposes:

- Preventing foodborne illness from consuming decomposing food
- Reducing food waste by preserving unused or uneaten food for later use
- Storage of harvested and processed plant and animal food products for distribution to consumers
- Enabling a better balanced diet throughout the year
- Preserving pantry food, such as spices or dry ingredients like rice and flour, for eventual use in cooking
- Preparedness for catastrophes, emergencies and periods of food scarcity or famine, whether as basic emergency preparedness (for most people) or in its more extreme form of survivalism (prepping)
- Religious reasons: for example, leaders in the LDS Church (Church of Jesus Christ of Latter-day Saints) instruct church members to store food.
- Protection from animals or theft

== Domestic food storage ==
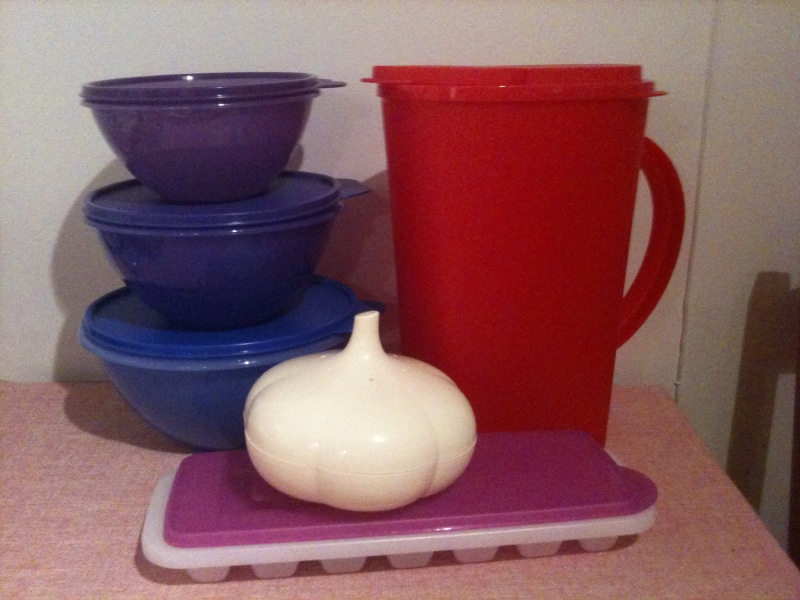
Tupperware kitchen storage containers designed for a variety of uses.

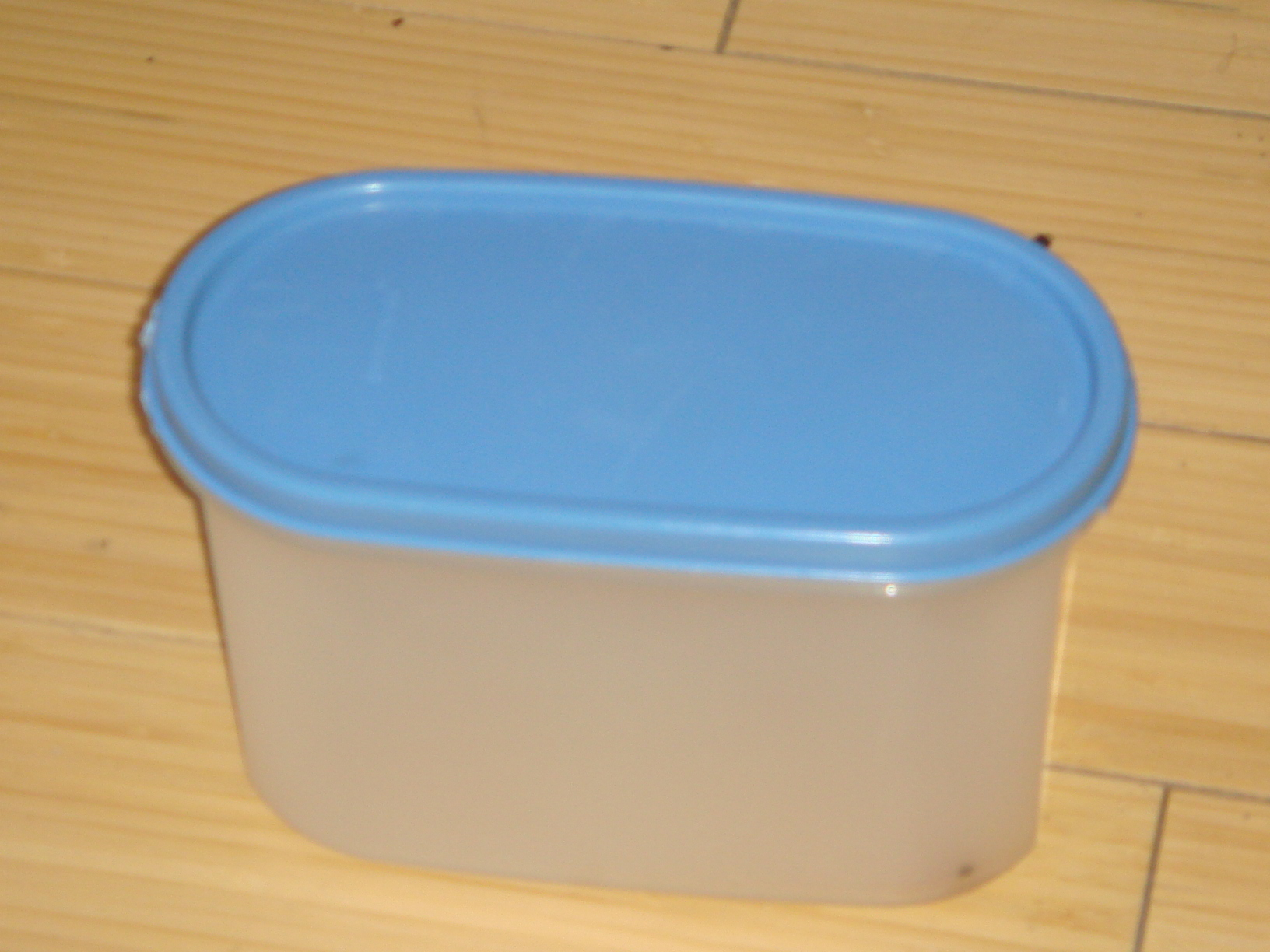
Plastic storage containers can be used to store food.

The safe storage of food for home use should strictly adhere to guidelines set out by reliable sources, such as the United States Department of Agriculture or the European Food Safety Authority. Scientists have thoroughly researched these guidelines to determine the most effective methods for reducing the real threat of food poisoning caused by unsafe food storage. It is also important to maintain proper kitchen hygiene to reduce the risk of bacterial or viral growth and food poisoning. The common food poisoning illnesses include Listeriosis, Mycotoxicosis, Salmonellosis, E. coli, Staphylococcal food poisoning and Botulism. Many other organisms can also cause food poisoning.

There are also safety guidelines for the correct methods of home canning. For example, there are specific boiling times that apply depending upon whether pressure canning or waterbath canning is being used in the process. These safety guidelines are intended to reduce the growth of mold and bacteria and the threat of potentially fatal food poisoning.

=== Food storage safety ===
==== Freezing food ====
To preserve food over long periods, the temperature should be maintained below 0 °F (−18 °C). Careful thawing and immediate cooking are necessary to maintain food safety.

Food frozen at −18 °C (0 °F) or below may be preserved almost indefinitely, although its quality is likely to deteriorate over time. The United States Department of Agriculture, Food Safety and Inspection Service, publishes a chart showing the suggested freezer storage time for common foods.

==== Refrigeration ====
Food storage in refrigerators may not be safe unless there is close adherence to temperature guidelines. In general, the temperature should be maintained at 4 °C (39 °F) or below, but never below 1 °C (34 °F).

Safe storage times vary by food and may depend on how the food was handled before being placed in the refrigerator.

=== Storing oils and fats ===
Oils and fats can go rancid quickly if not stored properly. Rancid cooking oils and fats do not often smell rancid until well after they have spoiled. Oxygen, light, and heat all contribute to cooking oils becoming rancid. The higher the level of polyunsaturated fat that an oil contains, the faster it spoils. The percentage of polyunsaturated fat in some common cooking oils is safflower (74%), sunflower (66%), corn (60%), soybean (37%), peanut (32%), canola (29%), olive (8%), and coconut (5%).

To help preserve oils from rancidification, they should be stored in a dark place, in oxygen-safe, light-reducing containers (e.g., dark glass or metal). Once opened, oils should be refrigerated and used within a few weeks, when some types begin to go rancid. Unopened oils can have a storage life of up to one year, but some types have a shorter shelf-life even when unopened (such as sesame and flaxseed).

=== Dry storage of foods ===
==== Vegetables ====
The guidelines for the safe storage of vegetables under dry conditions vary. This is because different vegetables have different characteristics; for example, tomatoes contain a lot of water, while root vegetables such as carrots and potatoes contain less. These factors, and many others, affect how long a vegetable can be kept in dry storage and the temperature required to preserve its usefulness. The following guideline shows the required dry storage conditions:

- Cool and dry: onion
- Cool and moist: root vegetable, potato, cabbage
- Warm and dry: winter squash, pumpkin, sweet potatoes, dried hot peppers

==== Grain ====
Grain, which includes dry kitchen ingredients such as flour, rice, millet, couscous, cornmeal, and so on, must be stored correctly to prevent insect or rodent infestation. Metal cans are used (in the United States, the smallest practical grain storage uses closed-top #10 metal cans measuring about 3 to 3.5 liters). Storage in grain sacks is ineffective; mold and pests can destroy a 25 kg cloth sack of grain within a year, even when stored off the ground in a dry area. On the ground or damp concrete, grain can spoil in as little as three days, and the grain might have to be dried before it can be milled. Food stored under unsuitable conditions should not be purchased or used because of the risk of spoilage. To test whether the grain is still good, sprout it. If it sprouts, it is still good, but if not, it should not be eaten.

==== Spices and herbs ====
Spices and herbs are often sold today prepackaged for pantry storage. The packaging serves dual purposes: storing and dispensing spices or herbs. They are sold in small glass or plastic containers or resealable plastic packaging. When spices or herbs are homegrown or bought in bulk, they can be stored at home in glass or plastic containers. They can be stored for extended periods, in some cases for years. However, after 6 months to a year, spices and herbs will gradually lose their flavor as the oils they contain will slowly evaporate during storage. Spices and herbs can be preserved in vinegar. Alternative methods for preserving herbs include freezing in water or combining with unsalted butter. Herbs can also be air dried.

==== Meat ====
Unpreserved meat has only a relatively short storage life. Perishable meats should be refrigerated, frozen, dried promptly or cured. Storage of fresh meat is a complex discipline that affects cost, shelf life, and eating quality, and the appropriate techniques vary by meat type and specific requirements. For example, dry ageing techniques are sometimes used to tenderize gourmet meats by hanging them in carefully controlled environments for up to 21 days, while game animals of various kinds may be hung after shooting. Details depend on personal tastes and local traditions. Modern techniques of preparing meat for storage vary with the type of meat and special requirements of tenderness, flavor, hygiene, and economy.

Semi-dried meats like salamis and country-style hams are first processed with salt, smoke, sugar, acid, or other "cures," then hung in cool, dry storage for extended periods, sometimes exceeding a year. Some of the materials added during the curing of meats serve to reduce the risks of food poisoning from anaerobic bacteria such as species of Clostridium that release botulinum toxin that can cause botulism. Typical ingredients of curing agents that inhibit anaerobic bacteria include nitrates.

=== Food rotation ===
Food rotation is important to preserve freshness. When food is rotated, the oldest food is used first. As food is used, new food is added to the pantry to replace it; the essential rationale is to use the oldest food as soon as possible so that nothing is in storage too long and becomes unsafe to eat. Labeling food with paper labels on the storage container, marking the date the container is placed in storage, can simplify this practice.

=== Emergency preparation ===
Guides for surviving emergency conditions in many parts of the world recommend maintaining a store of essential foods. A food storage calculator can help determine how much of these staple foods a person needs to store to sustain life for one full year. In addition to storing basic food items, many people choose to supplement their food storage with frozen or preserved garden-grown fruits and vegetables, as well as freeze-dried or canned produce. An unvarying diet of staple foods prepared in the same manner can cause appetite exhaustion, leading to less caloric intake. Another benefit of having a basic supply of food stored in the home is the potential for cost savings. Costs of dry bulk foods (before preparation) are often considerably less than convenience and fresh foods purchased at local markets or supermarkets. There is a significant market in convenience foods for campers, such as dehydrated food products.

== Commercial food logistics ==
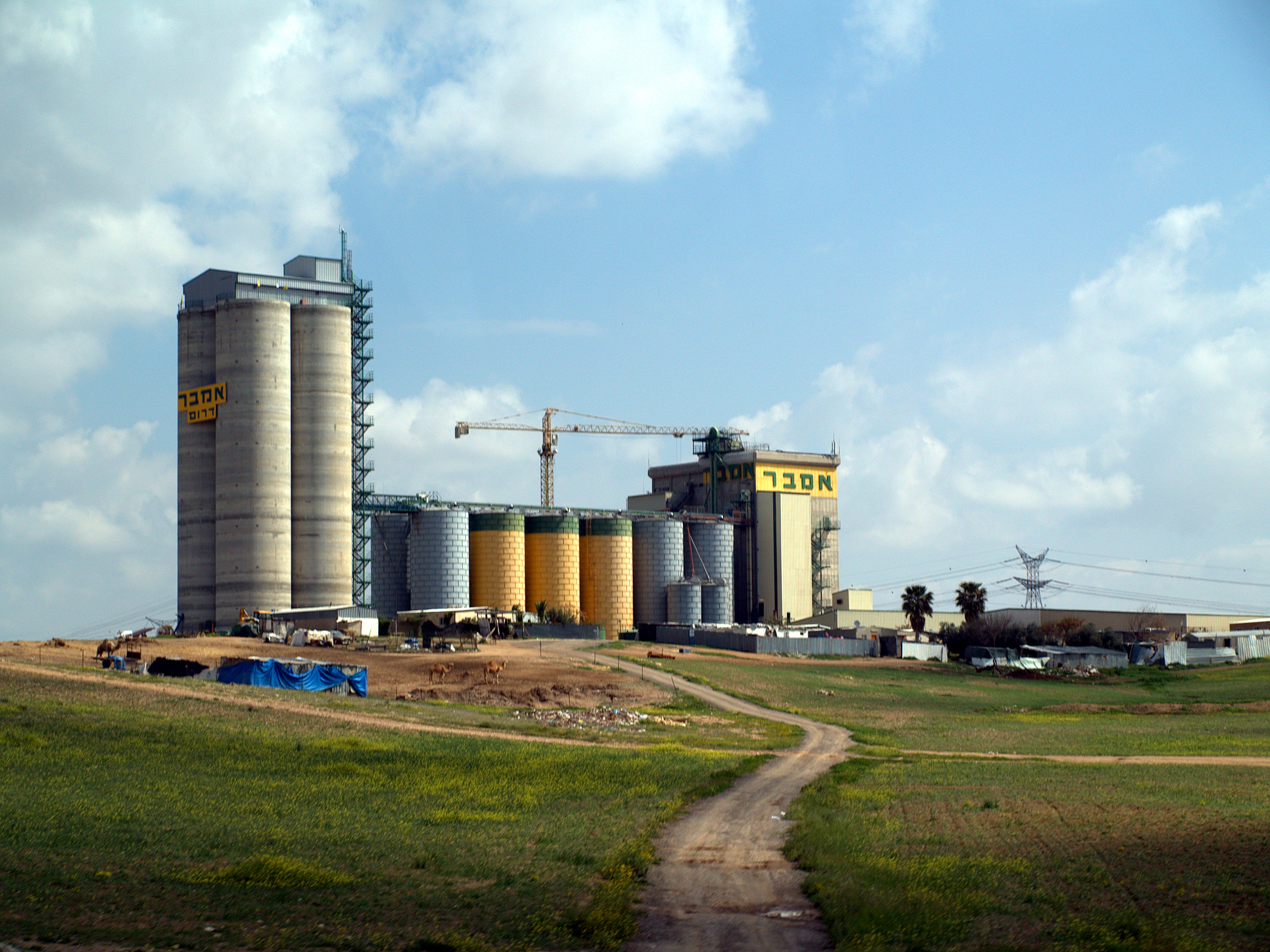
Silos connected to a grain elevator on a farm in Israel.

Grain and beans are stored in tall grain elevators, almost always at a railhead near the point of production. The grain is shipped to a final user in hopper cars. In the former Soviet Union grain was sometimes irradiated. In the U.S., threshing and drying are performed in the field, and transport is nearly sterile and in large containers that effectively suppress pest access, eliminating the need for irradiation.

Fresh fruits and vegetables are sometimes packed in plastic packaging and cups for premium fresh markets, or placed in large plastic tubs for sauce and soup processors. Fruits and vegetables are usually refrigerated at the earliest possible moment, and even so have a shelf life of two weeks or less.

In the United States, livestock is usually transported live, slaughtered at a major distribution point, hung, and transported for two days to a week in refrigerator cars before being butchered and sold locally. Before refrigerated rail cars, meat had to be transported live, which made it so expensive that only farmers and the wealthy could afford it every day. In Europe, much meat is transported live and slaughtered close to the point of sale. In much of Africa and Asia, most meat for local populations is raised, slaughtered, and eaten locally, which is believed to be less stressful for the animals involved and minimizes meat storage needs. In Australia and New Zealand, where a large proportion of meat production is for export, meat enters the cold chain early, being stored in large freezer plants before being shipped overseas in freezer ships.

== Food storage facilities ==
Food preservation methods include canning, food dehydration, pickling and more. Types of storage facilities include:

- Pantry
- Larder
- Root cellar

Fully dedicated food storage facilities include:

- Cool store — a large refrigerated room or building
- Cool warehouse — a very large refrigerated building
- Silo — used to store grains, like wheat and maize
- 2800 Polar Way — world's largest food freezer
- Controlled atmosphere storage — commercial facilities that regulate oxygen, carbon dioxide, and humidity to slow ripening and spoilage of fruits, extending storage life.

== See also ==
- Canning
  - Home canning
- Candying
- Food science
  - Food and Bioprocess Technology
  - Food chemistry
  - Food engineering
  - Food safety
  - Food microbiology
  - Food technology
- Dietary supplement
- Food dehydration
- Food fortification
- Food preservation
- Food rheology
- Food storage container
  - Food packaging
- Food supplement
- Hoarding (animal behavior)
- Nutraceutical
- Pickling
- Preserves
- Root cellar
- Shaker-style pantry box
- Storage clamp

== Sources ==
This article incorporates text from a free content work. Licensed under CC BY-SA 3.0 (license statement/permission). Text taken from The State of Food and Agriculture 2019. Moving forward on food loss and waste reduction, in brief, 24, FAO, FAO.
