= Food rheology =

Study of the fluid mechanical properties of food

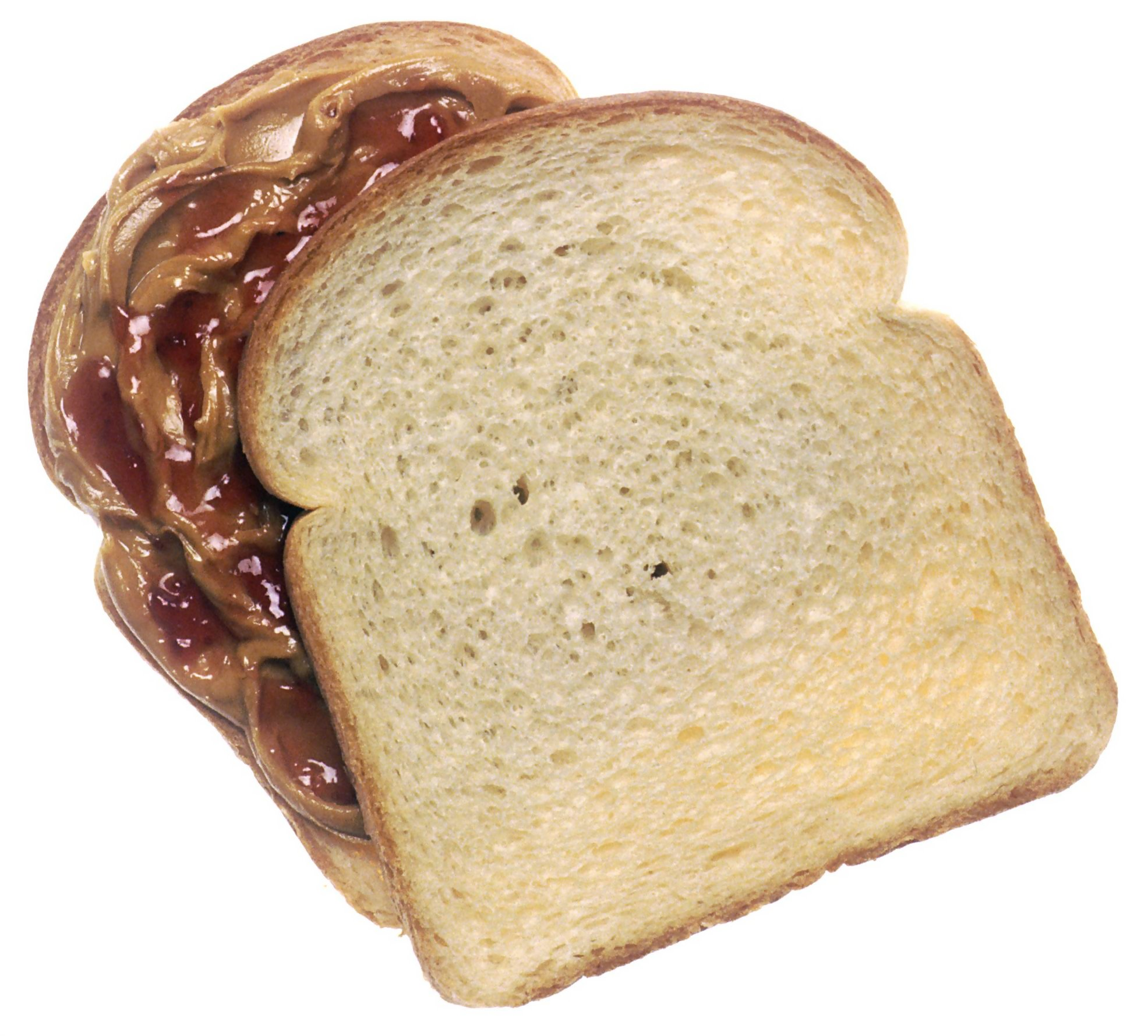
A peanut butter and jelly sandwich has various textural properties

Food rheology is the study of the rheological properties of food, that is, the consistency and flow of food under tightly specified conditions. The consistency, degree of fluidity, and other mechanical properties are important in understanding how long food can be stored, how stable it will remain, and in determining food texture. The acceptability of food products to the consumer is often determined by food texture, such as how spreadable and creamy a food product is. Food rheology is important in quality control during food manufacture and processing. Food rheology terms have been noted since ancient times. In ancient Egypt, bakers judged the consistency of dough by rolling it in their hands.

== Overview ==
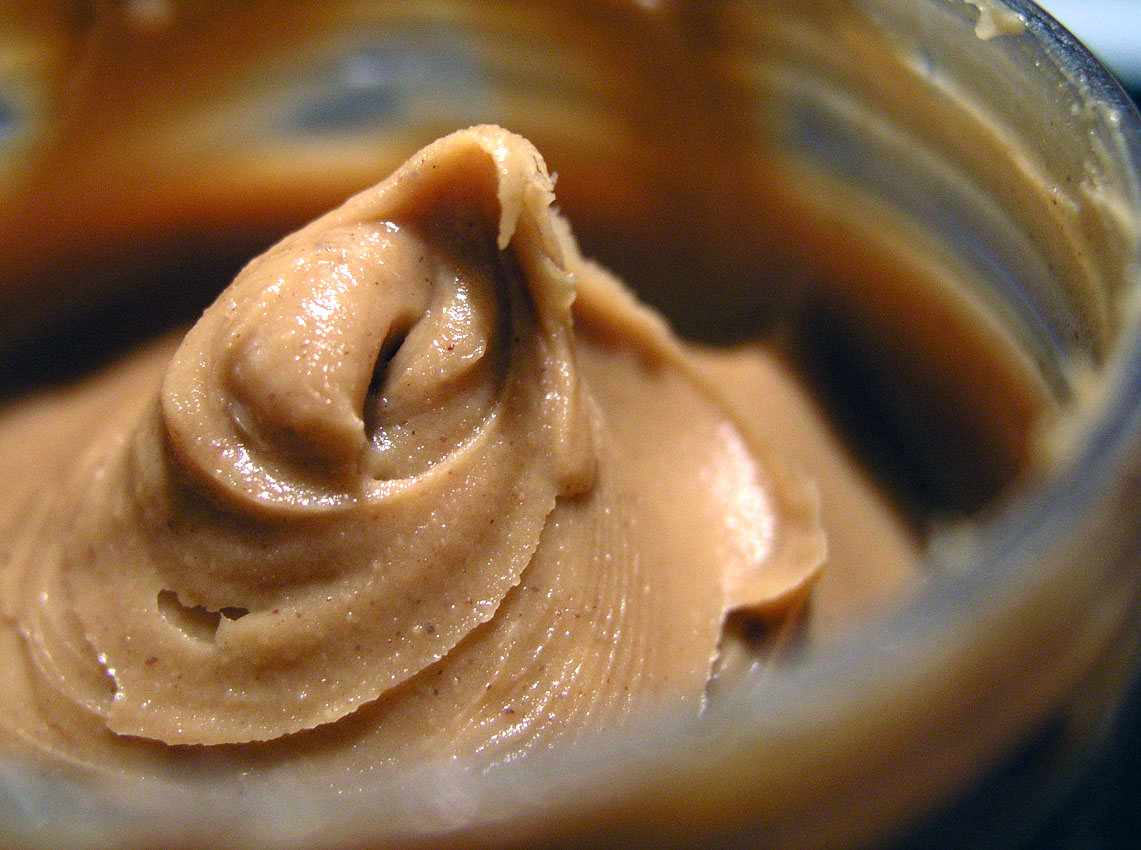
Peanut butter inside a jar

There is a large body of literature on food rheology because the study of food rheology entails unique factors beyond an understanding of the basic rheological dynamics of the flow and deformation of matter. Food can be classified according to its rheological state – such as a solid, gel, liquid, or emulsion – each with associated rheological behaviors, and its rheological properties can be measured. These properties will affect the design of food processing plants, as well as shelf life and other important factors, including sensory properties that appeal to consumers. Because foods are structurally complex, often a mixture of fluid and solids with varying properties within a single mass, the study of food rheology is more complicated than study in fields such as the rheology of polymers. However, food rheology is something we experience every day with our perception of food texture (see below) and basic concepts of food rheology well apply to polymers physics, oil flow etc. For this reason, examples of food rheology are didactically useful to explain the dynamics of other materials we are less familiar with. Ketchup is commonly used an example of Bingham fluid and its flow behavior can be compared to that of a polymer melt.

== Psychorheology ==
Psychorheology is the sensory judgement of rheological properties. It is a term used in the food industry, to describe how a food "feels" to the mouth. It is not necessarily straightforward to predict how a food will "feel" based purely on the true rheological properties.

The most important factor in food rheology is consumer perception of the product. This perception is affected by how the food looks on the plate as well as how it feels in the mouth, or "mouthfeel". Mouthfeel is influenced by how food moves or flows once it is in a person's mouth. This determines how desirable the food is judged to be.

== See also ==
- Aseptic processing
- Cosmetics
- Dietary supplement
- Food and Bioprocess Technology
- Food chemistry
- Food Engineering
- Food fortification
- Food grading
- Food microbiology
- Food packaging
- Food preservation
- Food safety
- Food science
- Food storage
- Food supplements
- Food technology
- Nutraceutical
- Nutrification (aka food enrichment or fortification)
- Pharmaceuticals
