= Magnetic Resonance in Chemistry =

- Discipline: Chemistry
- Language: English
- Edited by: Roberto R. Gil, Gary E. Martin

Publication details
- History: 1969-present
- Publisher: John Wiley & Sons
- Frequency: Monthly
- Impact factor: 2.447 (2020)

Standard abbreviations
- ISO 4: Magn. Reson. Chem.

Indexing
- CODEN: MRCHEG
- ISSN: 0749-1581 (print); 1097-458X (web)
- LCCN: 85647586
- OCLC no.: 639062734

Links
- Journal homepage; Online access; Online archive

Magnetic Resonance in Chemistry is a monthly peer-reviewed scientific journal covering the application of NMR, ESR, and NQR spectrometry in all branches of chemistry. The journal was established in 1969 and is published by John Wiley & Sons. The editors-in-chief are Roberto R. Gil (Carnegie Mellon University) and Gary E. Martin (Seton Hall University).

== Abstracting and indexing ==
The journal is abstracted and indexed in:

- Chemical Abstracts Service
- Scopus
- Science Citation Index

According to the Journal Citation Reports, the journal has a 2020 impact factor of 2.447.

== Highest cited papers ==
According to the Web of Science, the following papers have been cited most often (> 300 times):

1. Massiot, Dominique; Fayon, Franck; Capron, Mickael; King, Ian; Le Calvé, Stéphanie; Alonso, Bruno; Durand, Jean-Olivier; Bujoli, Bruno; Gan, Zhehong; Hoatson, Gina (2002). "Modelling one- and two-dimensional solid-state NMR spectra". Magnetic Resonance in Chemistry. 40: 70–76. doi:10.1002/mrc.984.
2. Willker, Wieland; Leibfritz, Dieter; Kerssebaum, Rainer; Bermel, Wolfgang (1993). "Gradient selection in inverse heteronuclear correlation spectroscopy". Magnetic Resonance in Chemistry. 31 (3): 287. doi:10.1002/mrc.1260310315.
3. Saitô, Hazime (1986). "Conformation-dependent13C chemical shifts: A new means of conformational characterization as obtained by high-resolution solid-state13C NMR". Magnetic Resonance in Chemistry. 24 (10): 835–852. doi:10.1002/mrc.1260241002.
