= Food engineering =

Field of applied physical sciences

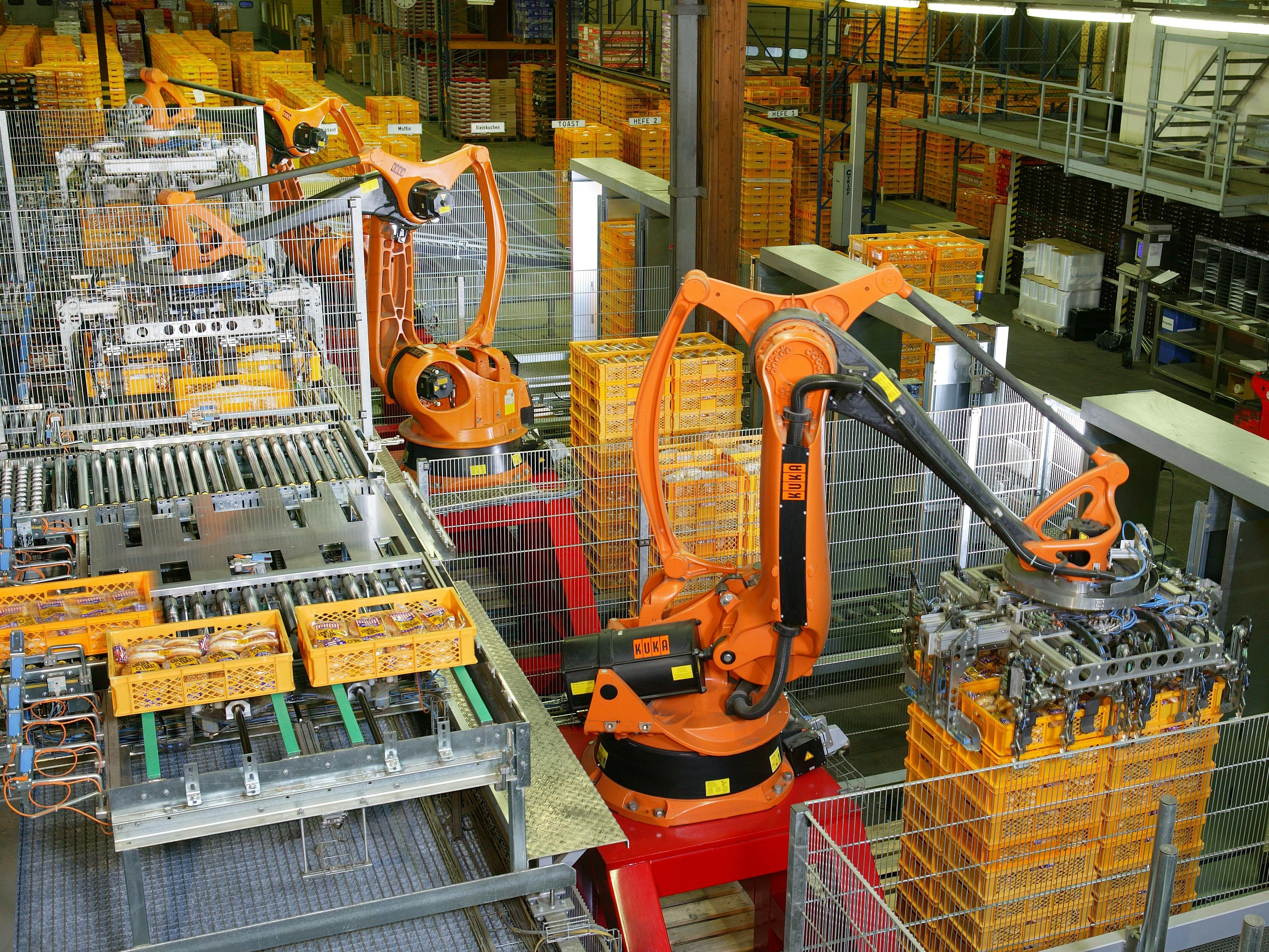
Bread factory in Germany

Food engineering is a scientific, academic, and professional field that interprets and applies principles of engineering, science, and mathematics to food manufacturing and operations, including the processing, production, handling, storage, conservation, control, packaging and distribution of food products. Given its reliance on food science and broader engineering disciplines, such as electrical, mechanical, civil, chemical, industrial and agricultural engineering, food engineering is considered a multidisciplinary and narrow field.

Due to the complex nature of food materials, food engineering also combines the study of more specific chemical and physical concepts, such as biochemistry, microbiology, food chemistry, thermodynamics, transport phenomena, rheology, and heat transfer. Food engineers apply this knowledge to the cost-effective design, production, and commercialization of sustainable, safe, nutritious, healthy, appealing, affordable and high-quality ingredients and foods, as well as to the development of food systems, machinery, and instrumentation.

== History ==
Although food engineering is a relatively recent and evolving field of study, it is based on long-established concepts and activities. The traditional focus of food engineering was preservation, which involved stabilizing and sterilizing foods, preventing spoilage, and preserving nutrients in food for prolonged periods of time. More specific traditional activities include food dehydration and concentration, protective packaging, canning and freeze-drying . The development of food technologies was greatly influenced and urged by wars and long voyages, including space missions, where long-lasting and nutritious foods were essential for survival. Other ancient activities include milling, storage, and fermentation processes. Although several traditional activities remain of concern and form the basis of today’s technologies and innovations, the focus of food engineering has recently shifted to food quality, safety, taste, health and sustainability.

== Application and practices ==
The following are some of the applications and practices used in food engineering to produce safe, healthy, and sustainable food that are well regarded by consumers:

=== Refrigeration and freezing ===
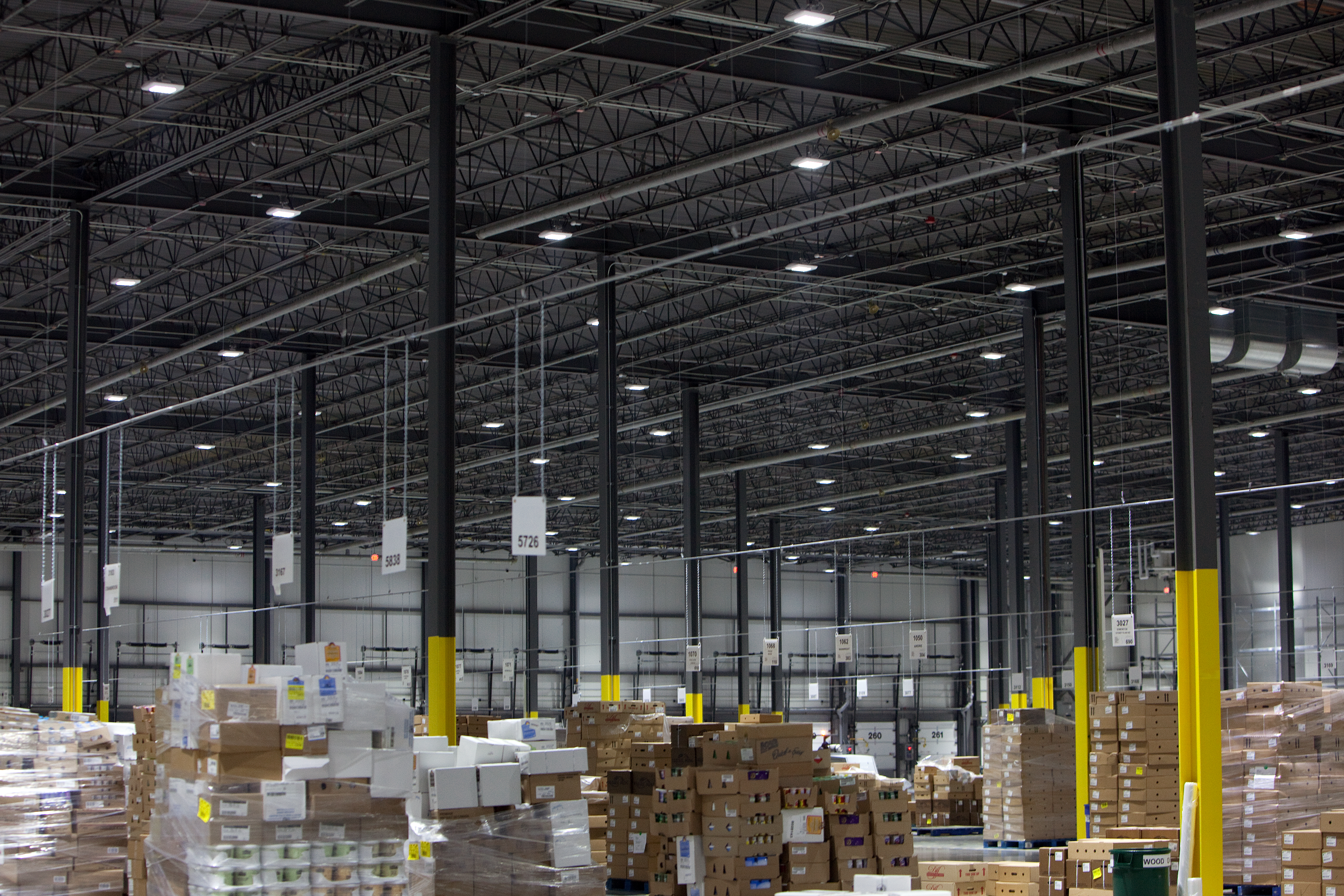
Food distribution center with refrigeration technologies

The main objective of food refrigeration and/or freezing is to preserve the quality and safety of food materials. Refrigeration and freezing contribute to the preservation of perishable foods, and to the conservation of some food quality factors, such as visual appearance, texture, taste, flavor and nutritional content. Freezing food slows the growth of bacteria that could potentially harm consumers.

=== Evaporation ===
Evaporation is used to pre-concentrate, increase the solid content, change the color, and reduce the water content of food and liquid products. This process is mostly seen when processing milk, starch derivatives, coffee, fruit juices, vegetable pastes and concentrates, seasonings, sauces, sugar, and edible oils. Evaporation is also used in food dehydration processes. The purpose of dehydration is to prevent the growth of molds in food, which only build when moisture is present. This process can be applied to vegetables, fruits, meats, and fish, for example.

=== Packaging ===
Food packaging technologies are used to extend the shelf-life of products, to stabilize food (preserve taste, appearance, and quality), and to maintain the food clean, protected, and appealing to the consumer. This can be achieved, for example, by packaging food in cans and jars. Because food production creates large amounts of waste, many companies are transitioning to eco-friendly packaging to preserve the environment and attract the attention of environmentally conscious consumers. Some types of environmentally friendly packaging include plastics made from corn or potatoes, bio-compostable plastic and paper products which disintegrate, and recycled content. Even though transitioning to eco-friendly packaging has positive effects on the environment, many companies are finding other benefits, such as reducing excess packaging material, helping to attract and retain customers, and showing that companies care about the environment.

=== Energy for food processing ===
To increase the sustainability of food processing, there is a need for energy efficiency and waste heat recovery. The replacement of conventional energy-intensive food processes with new technologies, like thermodynamic cycles and non-thermal heating processes, provides another potential to reduce energy consumption, reduce production costs, and improve the sustainability of food production.

=== Heat transfer in food processing ===
Heat transfer is important in the processing of almost every commercialized food product and is important to preserve the hygienic, nutritional and sensory qualities of food. Heat transfer methods include induction, convection, and radiation. These methods are used to create variations in the physical properties of food when freezing, baking, or deep frying products, and also when applying ohmic heating or infrared radiation to food. These tools allow food engineers to innovate in the creation and transformation of food products.

=== Food Safety Management Systems (FSMS) ===
A Food Safety Management System (FSMS) is "a systematic approach to controlling food safety hazards within a business in order to ensure that the food product is safe to consume." In some countries FSMS is a legal requirement, which obliges all food production businesses to use and maintain a FSMS based on the principles of Hazard Analysis Critical Control Point (HACCP). HACCP is a management system that addresses food safety through the analysis and control of biological, chemical, and physical hazards in all stages of the food supply chain. The ISO 22000 standard specifies the requirements for FSMS.

== Emerging technologies ==
The following technologies, which continue to evolve, have contributed to the innovation and advancement of food engineering practices:

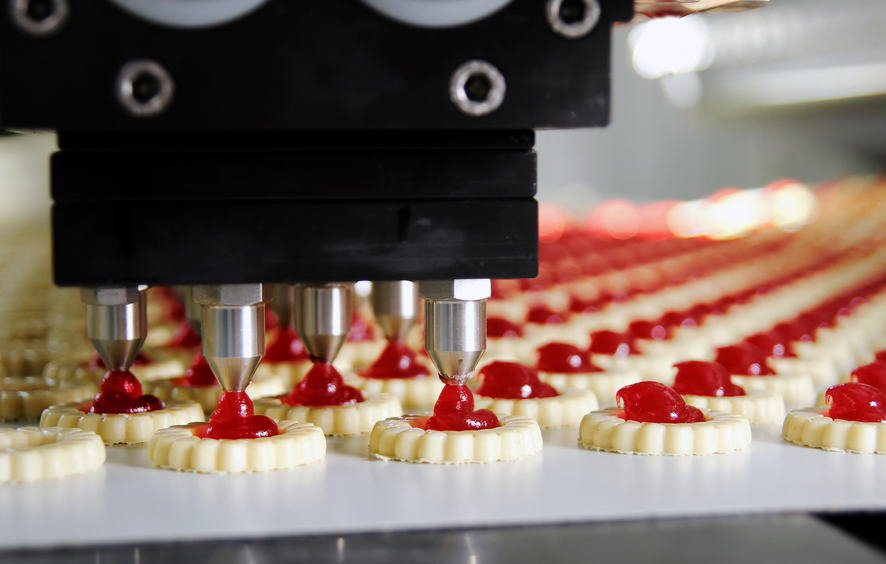
Production of cookies with automation

=== 3D printing ===
3D printing, also known as additive manufacturing, is the process of using digital files to create three dimensional objects. In the food industry, 3D printing of food is used for the processing of food layers using computer equipment. The process of 3D printing is slow, but is improving over time, with the goal of reducing costs and processing times. Some of the successful food items that have been printed through 3D technology are: chocolate, cheese, cake frosting, turkey, pizza, celery, among others. This technology is continuously improving, and has the potential of providing cost-effective, energy efficient food that meets nutritional stability, safety and variety.

=== Biosensors ===
Biosensors can be used for quality control in laboratories and at different stages of food processing. Biosensor technology is one way in which farmers and food processors have adapted to the worldwide increase in demand for food, while maintaining their food production and quality high. Furthermore, since millions of people are affected by food-borne diseases caused by bacteria and viruses, biosensors are becoming an important tool to ensure the safety of food. They help track and analyze food quality during several parts of the supply chain: in food processing, shipping and commercialization. Biosensors can also help with the detection of genetically modified organisms (GMOs), to help regulate GMO products. With the advancement of technologies, like nanotechnology, the quality and uses of biosensors are constantly being improved.

=== Milk pasteurization by microwave ===
When storage conditions of milk are controlled, milk tends to have a very good flavor. However, oxidized flavor is a problem that affects the taste and safety of milk in a negative way. To prevent the growth of pathogenic bacteria and extend the shelf life of milk, pasteurization processes were developed. Microwaved milk has been studied and developed to prevent oxidation compared to traditional pasteurized milk methods, and it has been concluded that milk has a better quality when it has microwaved milk pasteurization.

== Education and training ==
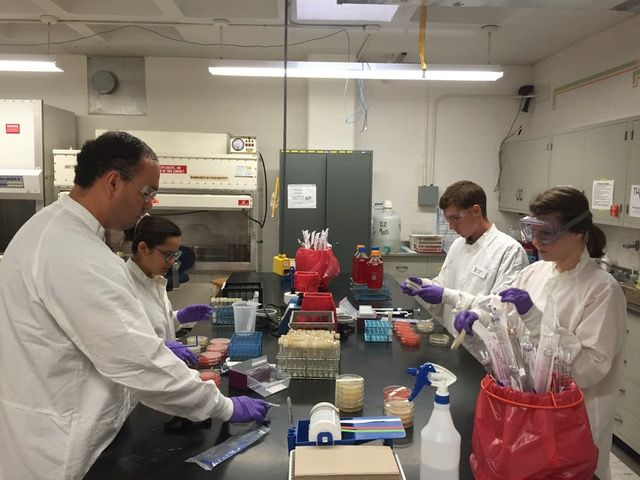
Students working in a food science laboratory

In the 1950s, food engineering emerged as an academic discipline, when several U.S. universities included food science and food technology in their curricula, and important works on food engineering appeared. Today, educational institutions throughout the world offer bachelor's, master's, and doctoral degrees in food engineering. However, due to the unique character of food engineering, its training is more often offered as a branch of broader programs in food science, food technology, biotechnology, or agricultural and chemical engineering. In other cases, institutions offer food engineering education through concentrations, specializations, or minors. Food engineering candidates receive multidisciplinary training in areas like mathematics, chemistry, biochemistry, physics, microbiology, nutrition, and law.

Food engineering is still growing and developing as a field of study, and academic curricula continue to evolve. Future food engineering programs are subject to change due to the current challenges in the food industry, including bio-economics, food security, population growth, food safety, changing eating behavior, globalization, climate change, energy cost and change in value chain, fossil fuel prices, and sustainability. To address these challenges, which require the development of new products, services, and processes, academic programs are incorporating innovative and practical forms of training. For example, innovation laboratories, research programs, and projects with food companies and equipment manufacturers are being adopted by some universities. In addition, food engineering competitions and competitions from other scientific disciplines are appearing.

With the growing demand for safe, sustainable, and healthy food, and for environmentally friendly processes and packaging, there is a large job market for food engineering prospective employees. Food engineers are typically employed by the food industry, academia, government agencies, research centers, consulting firms, pharmaceutical companies, healthcare firms, and entrepreneurial projects. Job descriptions include but are not limited to food engineer, food microbiologist, bioengineering/biotechnology, nutrition, traceability, food safety and quality management.

== Challenges ==
=== Sustainability ===
Food engineering has negative impacts on the environment, such as the emission of large quantities of waste and the pollution of water and air, which must be addressed by food engineers in the future development of food production and processing operations. Scientists and engineers are experimenting in different ways to create improved processes that reduce pollution, but these must continue to be improved in order to achieve a sustainable food supply chain. Food engineers must reevaluate current practices and technologies to focus on increasing productivity and efficiency, while reducing the consumption of water and energy, and decreasing the amount of waste produced.

=== Population growth ===
Even though food supply expands yearly, there has also been an increase in the number of hungry people. The world population is expected to reach 9-10 billion people by 2050 and the problem of malnutrition remains a priority. To achieve food security, food engineers are required to address land and water scarcity to provide enough growth and food for undernourished people. In addition, food production depends on land and water supply, which are under stress as the population size increases. There is a growing pressure on land resources, driven by expanding populations, leading to expansions of croplands; this usually involves the destruction of forests and exploitation of arable land. Food engineers face the challenge of finding sustainable ways to produce to adapt to the growing population.

=== Human health ===
Food engineers must adapt food technologies and operations to the recent consumer trend toward the consumption of healthy and nutritious food. To supply foods with these qualities, and for the benefit of human health, food engineers must work collaboratively with professionals in other domains, such as medicine, biochemistry, chemistry, and consumerism. New technologies and practices must be developed to increase the production of foods that have a positive impact on human health.

== See also ==
- Pharmaceuticals
- Food science
- Food technology
- Aseptic processing
- Dietary supplement
- Food and biological process engineering
- Food fortification
- Food preservation
- Food rheology
- Food supplements
- Future food technology
- Nutraceutical
- Nutrification
- Food and Bioprocess Technology
- Food safety
- Food chemistry
- Food physical chemistry
- Pasteurization
- Food dehydration
- Biosensors
- Biochemistry
- Microbiology
- Food quality
- Stabiliser
