= Food and Bioprocess Technology =

- Discipline: Food science
- Language: English
- Edited by: Da-Wen Sun

Publication details
- History: 2008–present
- Publisher: Springer Science+Business Media.

Standard abbreviations
- ISO 4: Food Bioprocess Technol.

Indexing
- ISSN: 1935-5130

Links
- Journal homepage

Food and Bioprocess Technology is a peer-reviewed scientific journal published by Springer Science+Business Media. The editor-in-chief is Da-Wen Sun (University College Dublin).

== Abstracting and indexing ==
Food and Bioprocess Technology is abstracted and indexed in:

- Science Citation Index Expanded
- Scopus
- Chemical Abstracts Service
- EBSCO databases
- CAB International
- Academic OneFile
- AGRICOLA
- CAB Abstracts
- Current Contents/Agriculture, Biology & Environmental Sciences
- EI-Compendex
- EMBiology
- Food Science and Technology Abstracts
- VINITI Database RAS

According to the Journal Citation Reports, the journal has a 2011 impact factor of 3.703, ranking it 4th out of 138 journals in the category "Food Science & Technology".
