= Fujii =

Fujii (written: 藤井 lit. "well of wisteria") is a Japanese surname. Notable people with the surname include:

- Akihito Fujii (藤井 彰人, born 1976), Japanese baseball player
- Akira Fujii (藤井 旭, 1941–2022), Japanese astronomer
- Atsushi Fujii (藤井淳志, born 1981), Japanese baseball player
- Benzō Fujii (藤井 勉三, 1840–1880), Japanese politician and governor of Hiroshima Prefecture
- Daisuke Fujii (藤井 大輔, born 1986), Japanese footballer
- Dennis Marc Fujii (born 1949), retired United States Army soldier
- Don Fujii, ring name of wrestler Tatsuki Fuji (藤井 達樹, born 1970)
- Fumiya Fujii (藤井 フミヤ, born 1962), Japanese musician
- Genki Fujii (藤井 厳喜, born 1952), Japanese political scientist
- Haruya Fujii (藤井 陽也, born 2000), Japanese footballer
- Henry Hajimu Fujii (1906–1976), American pioneer, farmer, lapidary, spokesman
- Hideki Fujii (藤井 秀樹, 1934–2010), Japanese photographer
- Hiroaki Fujii (藤井 宏昭, born 1933), Japanese diplomat and president of the Japan Foundation
- Hirohisa Fujii (藤井 裕久, 1932–2022), Japanese politician
- Hiroko Fujii (藤井 寛子, born 1982), Japanese table tennis player
- Hiromu Fujii (藤井 弘, 1935–2018), Japanese baseball player
- Hiroshi Fujii (藤井 啓史), engineer and manager for Mitsubishi Motors
- Isae Fujii (藤井 勇惠, 1944 or 1945–6 June 1994), murder victim in the 1994 Oriental Hotel Murder
- Izumi Fujii (藤井泉, born 1959), Japanese handball player
- Karen Fujii (藤井 夏恋, born 1996), Japanese singer, dancer, model and actress
- Katsuhisa Fujii (藤井 克久, born 1972), Japanese mixed martial artist and professional wrestler
- Kayoko Fujii (藤井 佳代子, born 1961), Japanese actress and voice actress
- Fujii Kaze (藤井 風, born 1997), Japanese singer-songwriter and musician
- Keinosuke Fujii (藤井 啓之助, 1888–1959), Japanese diplomat
- Kenta Fujii (藤井 謙汰, born 1994), Japanese Grand Prix motorcycle racer
- Kodai Fujii (藤井 航大, born 1991), Japanese footballer
- Kōichi Fujii (藤井 較一, 1858–1926), admiral in the Imperial Japanese Navy
- Kokoro Fujii (藤井 快, born 1992), Japanese sport climber and boulderer
- Kooyu Fujii (藤井 浩佑, 1882–1958), Japanese sculptor
- Kouya Fujii (藤井 皓哉, born 1996) Japanese baseball player
- Lena Fujii (藤井 リナ, born 1984), Japanese commercial fashion model, singer, and actress
- Mai Fujii (藤井 舞, born 1989), Japanese volleyball player
- Masao Fujii (藤井 将雄, 1968–2000), Japanese baseball player
- Megumi Fujii (藤井 恵, born 1974), Japanese mixed martial artist
- Michio Fujii (藤井 道雄, born 1939), Japanese tennis player
- Mihona Fujii (藤井 みほな, born 1974), shōjo manga artist
- Mina Fujii (藤井 美菜, born 1988), Japanese-American actress
- Mizuki Fujii (藤井 瑞希, born 1988), Japanese badminton player
- Motoo Fujii (藤井 基男, 1932–2009), Japanese table tennis player
- Nana Fujii (藤井 奈々, born 1998), Japanese shogi player
- Nanako Fujii (藤井 菜々子, born 1999), Japanese racewalker
- Naonobu Fujii (藤井 直伸, 1992–2023), Japanese volleyball player
- Nichidatsu Fujii (藤井 日達, 1885–1985), Buddhist monk and founder of the Nipponzan-Myōhōji order
- Norikazu Fujii (藤井 則和, 1925–1992), Japanese table tennis player
- Raika Fujii (藤井 来夏, born 1974), Japanese synchronized swimmer
- Rie Fujii (藤井 理絵, born 1978), known for abandoning her two infant children
- Rino Fujii (藤井 理乃), manga illustrator
- Ryo Fujii (藤井 亮, born 1996), Hong Kong-born Japanese footballer
- Ryota Fujii (藤井 亮太, born 1988), Japanese baseball player
- Sadakazu Fujii (藤井 貞和, born 1942), Japanese poet and scholar of Japanese literature
- Satoko Fujii (藤井 郷子, born 1958), avant-garde jazz pianist, accordionist and composer
- Satoshi Fujii (藤井 聡, born 1968), Japanese civil engineer, economist and social critic
- Sei Fujii (藤井 整, 1882–1954), human rights activist
- Shio Fujii (藤井 紫緒, born 1985), Japanese handball player
- Shōzō Fujii (藤猪 省太, born 1950), Japanese judoka
- Shugo Fujii (藤井 秀悟, born 1977), Japanese baseball player
- Shuuka Fujii (藤井 萩花, born 1994), Japanese dancer, fashion model, actress, and singer
- Sōta Fujii (藤井 聡太, born 2002), Japanese shogi player
- Tadamitsu Fujii (藤井 忠光, born 1954), Japanese ice hockey player
- Taiyo Fujii (藤井 太洋, born 1971), Japanese science fiction author
- Takao Fujii (藤井 孝男, born 1943), Japanese politician and member of the Japanese Diet
- Takashi Fujii (藤井 隆, born 1972), Japanese comedian
- Takashi Fujii (footballer) (藤井 貴, born 1986), Japanese footballer
- Takeshi Fujii (藤井 猛, born 1970), Japanese shogi player
- Takuro Fujii (藤井 拓郎, born 1985), Japanese swimmer
- Teruo Fujii (藤井 輝夫, born 1964), Japanese professor
- Tetsuya Fujii (藤井 哲也, born 1960), Japanese amateur astronomer and prolific discoverer of minor planets
- Tomio Fujii (藤井 富雄, 1924–2021), Japanese politician
- Tomonobu Fujii (藤井 誠暢, born 1980), Japanese racing driver
- Tomoya Fujii (藤井 智也, born 1998), Japanese footballer
- Yasuko Fujii (藤井 康子, born 1950), Japanese swimmer
- Yasuo Fujii (藤井 康雄, born 1962), Japanese baseball player
- Yoshitaka Fujii (藤井 善隆, born 1960), researcher in anesthesiology who fabricated data in at least 183 scientific paper
- Yuji Fujii (藤井 勇治, born 1950), Japanese politician and member of the Japanese Diet
- Yukiyo Fujii (藤井 ゆきよ, born 1985), Japanese actress and voice actress
- Yuko Fujii (藤井 優子, born 1990), Japanese table tennis player
- Yumiko Fujii (藤井 由宮子, born 1972), Japanese softball player
- Yuta Fujii (藤井 悠太, born 1991), Japanese footballer

== See also ==
- Fuji (disambiguation)
- Fujii Station, a railway station on the JR West Obama Line in Fukui, Japan
