= Fuji =

Fuji may refer to:

== Places ==
=== China ===
- Fuji, Xiangcheng City (付集镇), town in Xiangcheng City, Henan

=== Japan ===
- Mount Fuji, the tallest mountain in Japan
- Fuji River, river in Yamanashi and Shizuoka Prefectures
- Fuji-Hakone-Izu National Park in Central Honshu
- Fuji, Saga, town in Saga Prefecture
- Fuji, Shizuoka, city in Shizuoka Prefecture
- Fuji Speedway, a major race track at the base of Mt Fuji
- Another name for Fujiyoshida, city in Yamanashi Prefecture

=== Taiwan ===
- Fuji Fishing Port, Shimen District, New Taipei

== People ==
- Fuji (surname), a Japanese surname
- Fujianti Utami Putri (born 2002), an Indonesian actress
- Mr. Fuji, ring name of American professional wrestler and manager Harry Fujiwara (1934–2016)
- Mr. Fuji, one of many modern monikers of the creator of Fuji musical genre, Ayinde Barrister

=== Fictional characters ===
- Fuji (comics), a character in the Stormwatch series

== Music ==
- Mt. Fuji Jazz Festival, a jazz festival in Japan
- Fuji Rock Festival, a rock festival in Japan
- Fuji music, a music genre from Yorubaland of Nigeria
- Fuji (album), by Adekunle Gold, 2025

== Japanese companies ==
- FM Fuji, a radio station in Yamanashi Prefecture, Japan
- Fujifilm, a Japanese company producing cameras and photographic film
- Fuji Heavy Industries, Ltd., the former name of Subaru Corporation, a Japanese company producing industrial products
- Fuji TV, a Japanese television network
  - BS Fuji, a Japanese television channel
- Fuji Electric, a Japanese company producing electric products
- Fujitec, a Japanese company producing escalators and elevators
- Fujitsu, a computer company based in Japan
- Fuji Advanced Sports Inc., a U.S. distributor of bicycles made in Taiwan and the People's Republic of China
- Fuji Bank, a major bank in Japan which existed until 2002, now part of Mizuho Financial Group
- Fuji Iron & Steel, a steel company that existed from 1950 until its merger with Yawata Iron & Steel in 1970

== Plants ==
- Fuji (apple), a cultivar of apple
- Wisteria floribunda (Japanese: 藤, romanized: fuji), Japanese name of Japanese wisteria
- Prunus incisa (Fuji cherry), an endemic cherry species in Japan
- Arisaema serratum (Fuji cobra lily), found in damp forests of Japan
- Chrysanthemum × morifolium (Fuji mum), a hybrid species of perennial plant
- Cirsium purpuratum (Fuji thistle), a species of plume thistle native to Japan

== Other ==
- Ellipse Fuji, a French hang glider
- Fuji (film), a 1975 film by Robert Breer
- Fuji, the name of the three-pronged Atari logo
- Japanese ship Fuji
  - Japanese battleship Fuji, a late 19th-century Japanese battleship
  - Japanese icebreaker Fuji (AGB-5001), icebreaker of the JMSDF
- Fuji (train), a passenger train in Japan
- Fuji (spacecraft), a capsule type crewed spacecraft concept, proposed by NASDA
- Fuji (planchette writing), a traditional Chinese method for automatic writing
- Fuji University, a private university in Hanamaki, Iwate, Japan
- Fuji Women's University, a private university in Sapporo, Hokkaido, Japan

== See also ==
- Fiji (disambiguation)
- Fujian
- Fujii
