= Fuji (surname) =

Fuji is a Japanese surname. Notable people with the surname include:

- Ari Fuji, first woman pilot-in-command at a Japanese airliner
- Keiko Fuji, Japanese singer of the 1960s and 1970s, and mother of Hikaru Utada
- Naoya Fuji (藤 直也, born 1993), Japanese footballer
- Sumiko Fuji, Japanese actress
- Takako Fuji, Japanese actress
- Takeshi Fuji, American former professional boxer
- Yuki Fuji (冨士 祐樹, born 1981), Japanese footballer

== Fictional characters ==
- Shusuke Fuji, a character in the anime and manga The Prince of Tennis
- Chihiro Fuji, a character in the Inazuma Eleven
- Fuji Hakayito, Super Dave Osborne's assistant in Super Dave (TV series)
- Mr. Fuji, a recurring character in the Pokémon series

== See also ==
- Fujii (disambiguation)
- Fuji (disambiguation)
