= Fiji (disambiguation) =

Fiji is an island nation in the Pacific Ocean.

Fiji may also refer to:

- Crown Colony-class cruiser, Royal Navy class of light cruiser, the first eight vessels are known as Fiji class
- HMS Fiji (58), vessel of the above class
- Fiji Airways, the flag carrier airline of Fiji
- Fiji Water, a bottled water company
- Fiji, Saudi Arabia, a village
- Phi Gamma Delta, North-American college fraternity also known as Fiji
- Fiji (software), image processing software
- Fiji, codename for some models of the AMD Radeon Rx 300 series of graphics processor by AMD
- George Veikoso (1970–2025), Fijian singer-songwriter known by his stage name Fiji
- Little Fiji, female professional wrestler from the Gorgeous Ladies of Wrestling
- Mountain Fiji, female professional wrestler from the Gorgeous Ladies of Wrestling

== See also ==
- Fidji (disambiguation)
- Fuji (disambiguation)
