= IARU =

IARU or Iaru may refer to:

- International Amateur Radio Union
- International Alliance of Research Universities
- Irish Amateur Rowing Union, former title of Rowing Ireland
- Aaru, the heavenly paradise in Egyptian mythology
