= Yuko Fujigaki =

Japanese sociologist(1962-)

Yuko Fujigaki (Japanese: 藤垣 裕子; born 1962) is a Japanese academic and researcher specializing in science and technology studies (STS) and scientometrics. She is a professor at the University of Tokyo's Graduate School of Arts and Sciences and has held several senior academic leadership positions at the university. In September 2026, she was selected as the university's 32nd president, becoming the first woman chosen to lead the institution since its establishment in 1877. She is scheduled to assume office on April 1, 2027, succeeding Teruo Fujii.

Fujigaki's research examines relationships between scientific knowledge, public policy, and society, with particular emphasis on the social responsibility of scientists, scientific expertise, research evaluation, and public engagement in science and technology. She has contributed to the development of science and technology studies in Japan through academic publications, professional society leadership, and international scholarly collaboration.

== Early life and education ==
Fujigaki was born in 1962 in Japan. She studied at the University of Tokyo, graduating from its College of Arts and Sciences in 1985. She subsequently pursued graduate studies at the same university, completing a master's degree in 1987 and a doctorate in 1990 in interdisciplinary scientific studies.

Her academic training preceded a research career focused on the interaction between science, technology, institutions, and society.

== Academic career ==
Fujigaki began her academic career as an assistant professor at the University of Tokyo in 1990, a position she held until 1996. She subsequently joined Japan's National Institute of Science and Technology Policy, where she worked from 1996 to 2000 in a research leadership position.

In 2000, she returned to the University of Tokyo as an associate professor, serving in that capacity until 2009. She became a professor in January 2010 at the Graduate School of Arts and Sciences, where her academic work focused on science and technology studies, scientometrics, and the social organization of scientific research.

Fujigaki served as president of the Japanese Society for Science and Technology Studies from 2013 to 2016. She was also program chair of the 2010 joint conference of the Society for Social Studies of Science and the Japanese Society for Science and Technology Studies.

Within the University of Tokyo, she served as chair of the Department of Interdisciplinary Studies in 2014 and vice dean of the College and Graduate School of Arts and Sciences from 2015 to 2016. She subsequently served as an executive vice president of the university, contributing to its academic administration and institutional leadership.

== Research and scholarship ==
Fujigaki's research focuses on the relationship between scientific expertise and society, particularly the ways in which scientific knowledge is evaluated, communicated, and used in public decision-making. Her work addresses the social responsibilities of scientists, research evaluation, public participation in science, and the relationship between scientific and social rationality.

Her scholarship has also explored the development of science and technology studies in Japan and East Asia. In a 2009 article published in East Asian Science, Technology and Society, she examined the history of Japanese science and technology studies, focusing on the governance of science and public engagement.

Fujigaki has undertaken research on responsible research and innovation, scientific misconduct, public communication of emerging technologies, and comparisons of scientific responsibility across national and disciplinary contexts. Her publications include studies of public discourse surrounding microplastics and the development of research practices and scientific institutions.

She has also participated in the editorial activities of international academic journals, including Social Studies of Science, Science and Public Policy, and East Asian Science, Technology and Society: An International Journal.

== Selection as University of Tokyo president ==
On September 28, 2026, the University of Tokyo's University President Screening and Inspection Committee selected Fujigaki as the institution's next president. She was chosen to succeed Teruo Fujii, whose term ends on March 31, 2027. Her six-year term is scheduled to run from April 1, 2027, through March 31, 2033.

Her selection marked the first time a woman had been chosen to lead the University of Tokyo in its nearly 150-year history. The appointment attracted national and international attention in the context of gender representation in Japanese higher education leadership.

At a press conference on September 29, 2026, Fujigaki addressed the university's responsibilities to society and the importance of rebuilding public confidence in academic institutions. Her selection followed a period of public scrutiny of the university over research ethics, governance, and financial oversight issues.

Reporting in The Japan Times discussed her appointment in relation to demands for institutional reform and wider debates about women's representation in university leadership. The selection process and its public reception also became the subject of discussion about governance and gender equality in Japanese academia.

== Selected publications ==
Fujigaki has authored and edited works on science and technology studies, the social responsibility of scientists, and the governance of scientific research. Selected publications include:

- Fujigaki, Yuko (1998). "Filling the Gap between the Discussion on Science and Scientist's Everyday Activities: Applying the Autopoiesis System Theory to Scientific Knowledge." Social Science Information, 37(1), 5–22.
- Fujigaki, Yuko, and Loet Leydesdorff (2000). "Quality Control and Validation Boundaries in a Triple Helix of University-Industry-Government: 'Mode 2' and the Future of University Research." Social Science Information, 39(4), 635–655.
- Fujigaki, Yuko (2002). "Analysis on Dynamics of Development in Research Themes in Interdisciplinary Fields: Analysis Using Personal Distribution versus Papers." Scientometrics, 54(1), 63–74.
- Fujigaki, Yuko (2009). "STS in Japan and East Asia: Governance of Science and Technology and Public Engagement." East Asian Science, Technology and Society: An International Journal, 3, 511–518.
- Fujigaki, Yuko, editor (2015). Lessons from Fukushima: Japanese Case Studies on Science, Technology and Society. Springer.
