= Junichi Hamada =

Japanese academic administrator

Jun'ichi Hamada
- 濱田 純一

29th President of the University of Tokyo
- In office April 1, 2009 – March 31, 2015
- Preceded by: Hiroshi Komiyama
- Succeeded by: Makoto Gonokami

Personal details
- Born: March 14, 1950 (age 76) Akashi, Japan
- Education: University of Tokyo
- Profession: Academic

Junichi Hamada (濱田 純一, Hamada Jun'ichi ; born March 14, 1950) is the 29th President of the University of Tokyo in Tokyo, Japan. He was born in Akashi in Hyōgo Prefecture, graduated from Nada High School and is the first University of Tokyo President to be born after World War II. He is also a Professor of Law, specializing in media law, constitutional law, the freedom of speech, and human rights law. He earned his Bachelor's, Master's, and Doctorate degrees from the University of Tokyo.

Academic offices
Preceded by Hiroshi Komiyama	President of University of Tokyo; April 2009 – March 2015	Succeeded by Makoto Gonokami
