= Fidji (disambiguation) =

Fidji or Fiji is an island nation in the Pacific Ocean.

Fidji may also refer to:

- Fidji (perfume), a perfume by Guy Laroche
- Fidji Simo (born 1985), French-American businesswoman

== See also ==
- Fiji (disambiguation)
