= Makoto Gonokami =

Japanese physicist

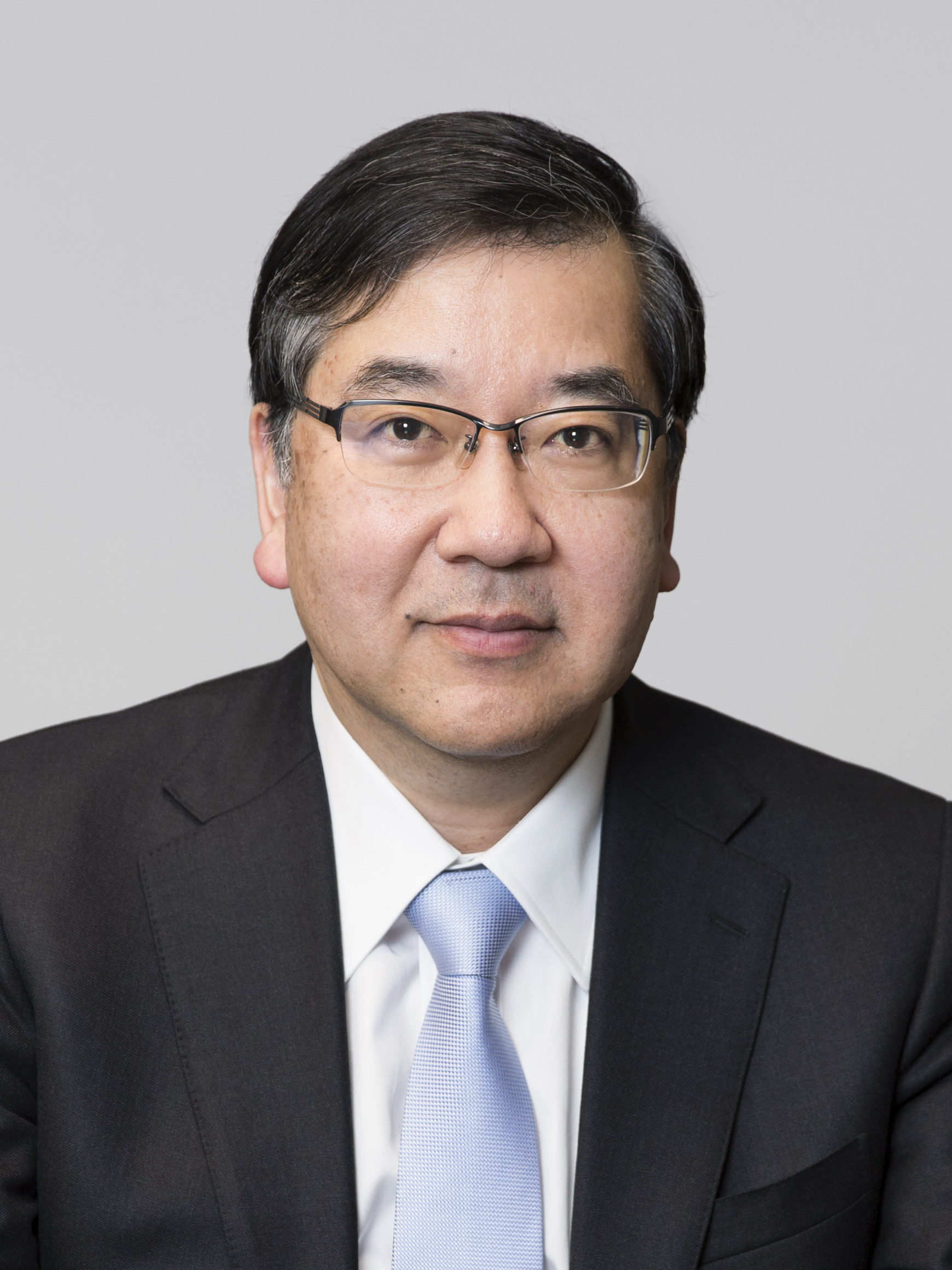
- Gonokami in 2018
- Born: 1957 (age 68–69); Komae City, Tokyo
- Education: University of Tokyo (PhD)
- Occupations: Researcher, teacher
- Title: President of University of Tokyo
- Term: April 2015 - March 2021
- Predecessor: Junichi Hamada
- Successor: Teruo Fujii

Makoto Gonokami (五神 真, Gonokami Makoto; born 1957) is a Japanese professor of science and engineering at the University of Tokyo (UTokyo), mostly in the field of physics. He served as the 30th president of UTokyo, after succeeding Junichi Hamada who retired in 2015, and until March 2021. After his presidency at UTokyo, he has served as the president of Riken since 2022.

He works in the graduate school of science, school of engineering in the institution before being dean in graduate school of science and vice president of the university.

He holds a PhD in optical physics at University of Tokyo and most of his research based on Quantum physics and participate in Center for Quantum Materials.

He served as the chair of IARU for two years (2018–2020).

== Notes ==
Academic offices
Preceded by Junichi Hamada	President of University of Tokyo; April 2015 – March 2021	Succeeded by Teruo Fujii
