= Tokyo Metropolitan Toyama High School =

Public high school in Tokyo, Japan

- 東京都立戸山高等学校

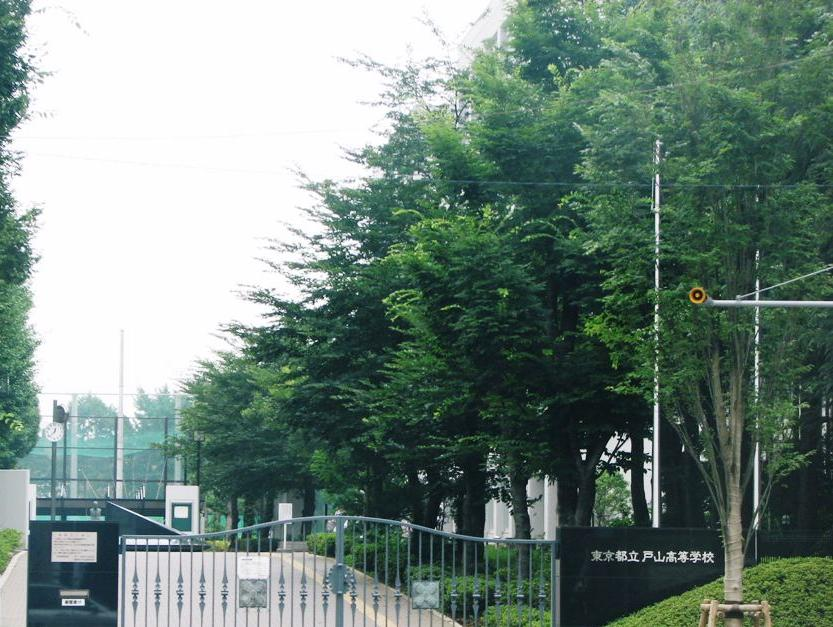

Location
- 3-19-1 Toyama, Shinjuku-ku, Tokyo 162-0052, Japan; 35°42′24″N 139°42′37″E

Information
- Type: Public secondary school
- Established: 16 September 1888
- Gender: Coeducational
- Website: www.metro.ed.jp/toyama-h/

Tokyo Metropolitan Toyama High School (東京都立戸山高等学校, Tōkyō-toritsu Toyama Kōtōgakkō) is a public secondary school operated by the Tokyo Metropolitan Government in Toyama, Shinjuku, Tokyo, Japan.

The school has been designated as a Super Science High School (SSH) by the Ministry of Education, Culture, Sports, Science and Technology (MEXT). It is also part of the Team Medical (TM) programme administered by the Tokyo Metropolitan Government Board of Education, which supports students intending to pursue careers in medicine.

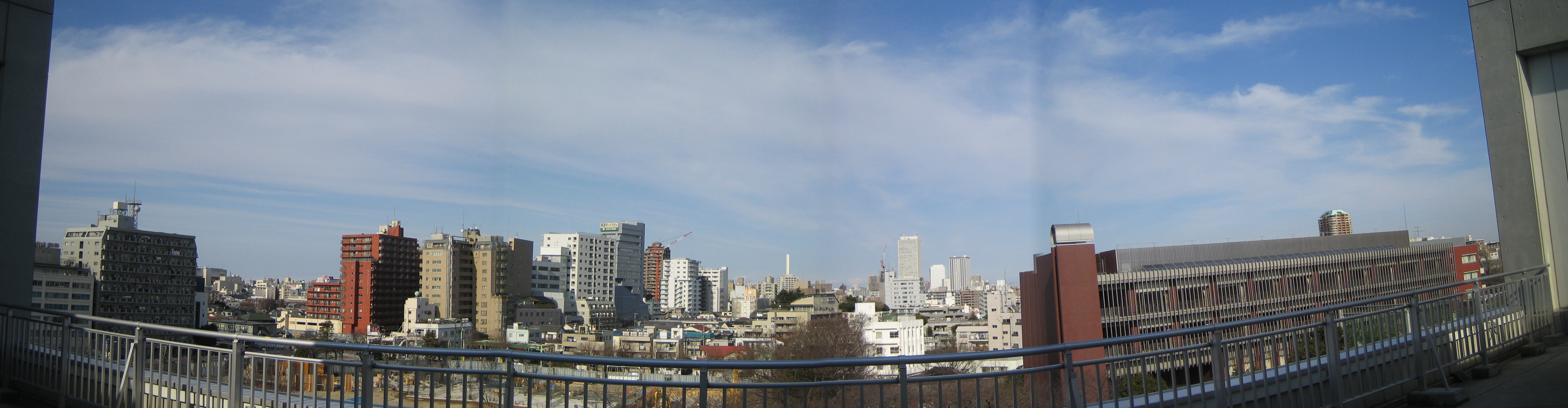
View towards Mejiro from the school's roof (2007)

== Educational philosophy ==
- Develop individuality
- Value effort and take responsibility
- Cultivate both intellect and physical well-being

== History ==
Tokyo Metropolitan Toyama High School was established on 16 September 1888. It is one of the long-established public high schools in Tokyo and has developed a reputation for academic achievement.

The school has been designated multiple times as a Super Science High School (SSH), a programme established by MEXT to promote advanced science education. It has also participated in the Team Medical (TM) initiative, which encourages students to pursue medical and healthcare-related careers.

== Timeline ==
- 2004 — Designated as a Super Science High School (SSH) for a three-year period
- 2007 — Second SSH designation (five-year period)
- 2012 — Begins a two-year transitional SSH period
- 2014 — Third SSH designation (five-year period)
- 2016 — Designated as a Team Medical (TM) school
- 2017 — Celebrates its 130th anniversary; renovation of the martial arts building begins
- 2019 — Fourth SSH designation (five-year period)
- 2024 — Enters a transitional period following the fourth SSH designation

== Campus ==
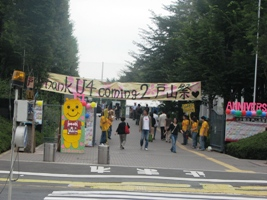
School building in 2006

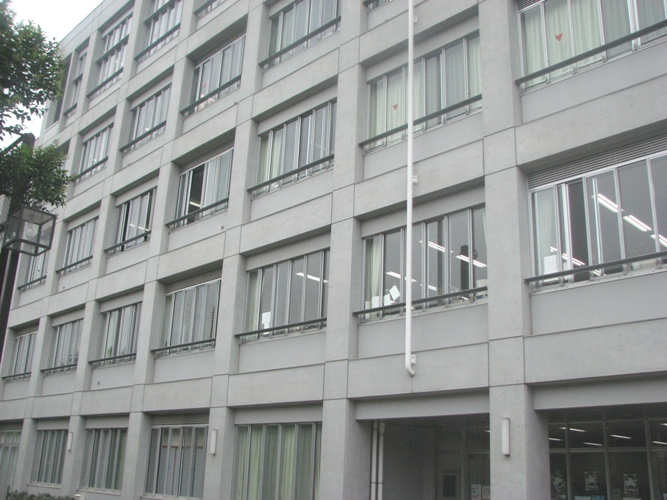
New school building

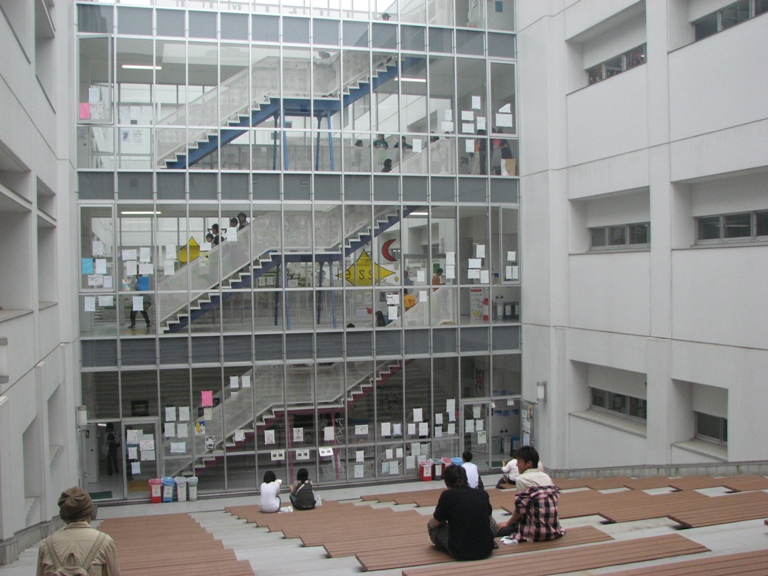
Atrium staircase

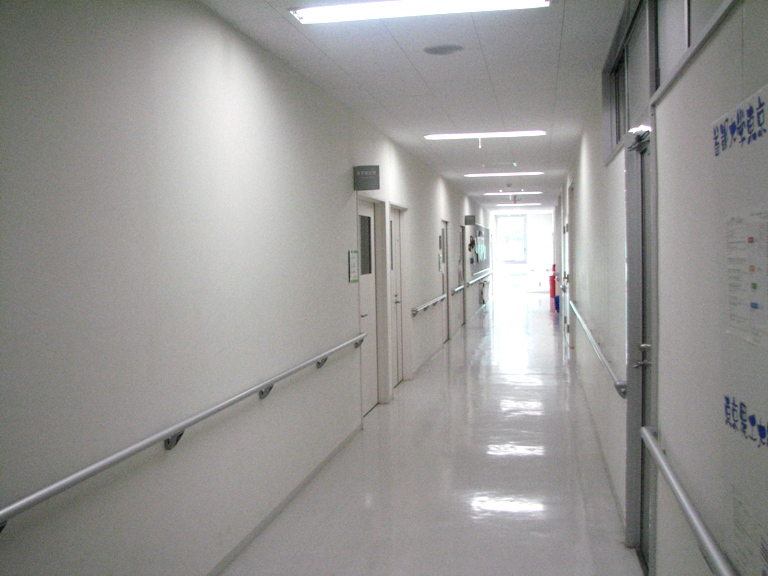
School corridor

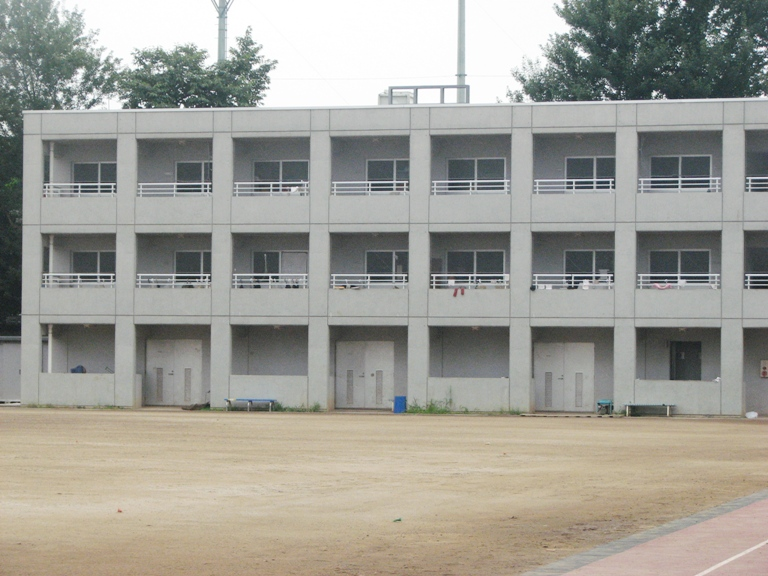
Clubroom building

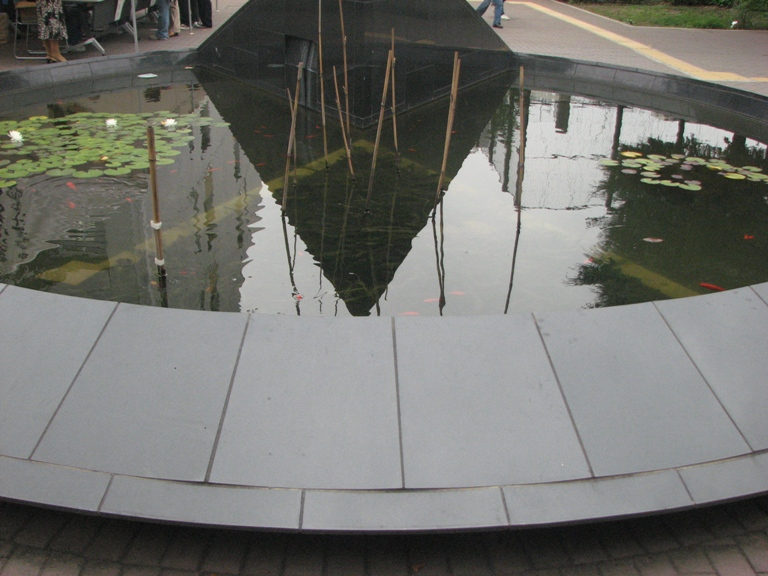
Radian Pond on campus

== Access ==
- 1 minute on foot from Nishi-waseda Station on the Tokyo Metro Fukutoshin Line
- 10 minutes on foot from Takadanobaba Station on the Yamanote Line, Seibu Shinjuku Line, and Tokyo Metro Tozai Line

== Notable alumni ==
- Tadatoshi Fujimaki (manga artist)
- Masato Hagiwara (actor)
- Tomoyuki Hoshino (author)
- Kiyoshi Jinzai (novelist)
- Nana Katase (actress)
- Hiroshi Komiyama (scientist)
- Shinichiro Kurimoto (author and politician)
- Ichiro Miyashita (politician)
- Tadashi Sasaki (banker)
- Hideo Shima (engineer)
- Mitsuru Yoshida (author)
