= Takeshi Sasaki (political scientist) =

Japanese political scientist

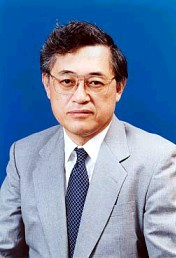
- Sasaki in 2001
- Born: July 15, 1942 (age 84); Akita, Japan

Academic background
- Education: University of Tokyo
- Thesis: 主権・抵抗権・寛容-ジャン・ボタンの国家哲学- (1973)
- Academic advisor: Kanichi Fukuda

Academic work
- Discipline: Political science
- Institutions: University of Tokyo

Takeshi Sasaki (佐々木毅; born July 15, 1942) is a Japanese political scientist who served as the 27th president of the University of Tokyo. He has served as the chairman of the Japan Academy since 2022.

== Overview ==
Sasaki was born in a village called Senya (now Misato) in the northeastern prefecture of Akita in 1942, during the Second World War. His father, Chohachi, served as the mayor of the village. After graduating from Akita High School in 1961, he went on to study political science at the Faculty of Law, University of Tokyo (UTokyo), where he was supervised by Kanichi Fukuda (福田歓一). He earned his PhD from the same university in 1973, with a thesis entitled 'Sovereignty, Resistance, and Tolerance: Jean Bodin's Philosophy of State' (主権・抵抗権・寛容――ジャン・ボダンの国家哲学).

In the 1980s, he broadened his analysis to contemporary American political thought, and at the same time, he became active in the debate on contemporary Japanese politics, focusing especially on the keyword 'lateral input (横からの入力)' (American pressure).

During his four-year presidency at the university from 2001, the university gained more independence but started receiving less support from the government.

During the tenure of President Hasumi, Japanese society was beset by a financial and economic debacle of profound severity, a period marked not by the smooth and continuous march of history but by abrupt and profound disjunctions. The complacency wrought from three or four decades of economic prosperity has dulled our collective sensibility to such rudimentary truths, a malaise of the spirit that obscures even the most basic of understandings.

— Takeshi Sasaki, 学内広報. University of Tokyo, 11 April 2001

He placed this turiningpoint in the university's governance in the wider context of the country's first long-term economic and political stagnation since the Second World War and the widespread pessimism that became widespread in the country.

Striving for excellence involves a commitment to being first-rate in both intellectual and practical endeavours. This quest is intrinsically linked to the continual self-improvement and potential expansion in all life's facets. Essentially, it is a profound dedication to self-cultivation beyond comparison. It embodies a mentality of self-care, whereas neglect in self-cultivation can lead to a loss of self-identity, resulting in a tendency to merely follow others without a clear sense of personal direction.

— Takeshi Sasaki, Speech at the matriculation ceremony, 2004,

Analogous to this mentality he wished for first-year students, he advocated that the university itself should not be satisfied with merely being the premier academic and educational authority in the world's second-largest economy as it had been. Instead, it should stand on its own feet and commit to self-improvement, especially in the forthcoming era of the country's gradual decline.

Academic offices
Preceded by Shigehiko Hasumi	President of University of Tokyo; April 2001 – March 2005	Succeeded by Hiroshi Komiyama
