= Hiroshi Komiyama =

Japanese scientist

Hiroshi Komiyama (小宮山 宏, Komiyama Hiroshi; born December 15, 1944) is a Japanese scientist. He was the president of University of Tokyo from April 2005 to March 2009. He is also the chairman of Mitsubishi Research Institute. His major research fields are Chemical engineering, Environmental engineering, functional material science and CVD reaction engineering. He is member of the World Knowledge Dialogue Scientific Board. When he was an undergraduate, he belonged to the American football club at University of Tokyo.

== Biography ==
- On December 15, 1944, he was born in Tochigi Prefecture.
- In 1963, he graduated from Tokyo Metropolitan Toyama High School in Tokyo.
- In 1967, he graduated the Chemical Engineering course of Engineering department, University of Tokyo.
- In 1972, he got Ph.D. the School of Chemical Engineering, University of Tokyo
- In December 1972, he was hired by University of Tokyo (assistant professor)
- In 1977, he became a lecturer at University of Tokyo
- In 1981, he became assistant professor at University of Tokyo
- In July 1988, he became a professor at University of Tokyo
- In April 2000, he became the head of Engineering Department at University of Tokyo
- In 2002, he became the president of Society for Chemical Engineers of Japan.
- In 2003, he became a vice president of University of Tokyo.
- In 2005, he became the 28th president of University of Tokyo.
- In 2013, he became a judge for the Queen Elizabeth Prize for Engineering.

== Awards ==
Komiyama was awarded the Sheikh Mohammed bin Rashid Al Maktoum Knowledge Award in 2017.

== Writings ==
- Vision 2050: Roadmap for a Sustainable Earth, published by Springer Science+Business Media, 2008. ISBN 978-4-431-09430-2.
- Structuring the Knowledge (知識の構造化, Chishiki no kōzōka), published by Ōpun-narezzi (オープンナレッジ), December 2004. ISBN 4-902444-03-8.
- Technology to Sustain the Earth (地球持続の技術, Chikyū-Zizoku no gijutsu), published by Iwanami Shoten Publishing, December 1999. ISBN 4-00-430647-7.
- Answering to the Issues of Global Warming (地球温暖化問題に答える, Chikyū-ondanka-mondai ni kotaeru), published by University of Tokyo Press, December 1999. ISBN 4-13-002072-2.

Academic offices
Preceded by Takeshi Sasaki	President of University of Tokyo; April 2005 – March 2009	Succeeded by Junichi Hamada
