= Japanese ship Fuji =

Two ships of the Imperial Japanese Navy were named Fuji:

- Japanese battleship Fuji, a Fuji-class battleship launched in 1896 and stricken in 1922
- Japanese destroyer Fuji, a Momi-class destroyer launched in 1920 and scrapped in 1946
