= Mai Fujii =

Japanese volleyball player

Personal information
- Full name: Mai Fujii
- Nickname: Salla
- Born: April 12, 1989 (age 37); Kitakyushu, Fukuoka, Japan
- Height: 1.74 m (5 ft 9 in)
- Weight: 62 kg (137 lb)
- Spike: 299 cm (118 in)
- Block: 275 cm (108 in)

Volleyball information
- Position: Wing Spiker
- Current club: Denso Airybees
- Number: 17

Mai Fujii (藤井 舞 Fujii Mai, born 12 April 1989) is a Japanese volleyball player who plays for Denso Airybees.

== Clubs ==
- Kyushubunka High School → Denso Airybees (2008-)

== National team ==
- (Japan) 2008 - 1st AVC Women's Cup

== Honors ==
- Team
  - Japan Volleyball League/V.League/V.Premier
    Runners-up (1): 2007-2008
  - Kurowashiki All Japan Volleyball Championship
    Champions (1): 2008
