= Hiroaki Fujii =

Japanese diplomat

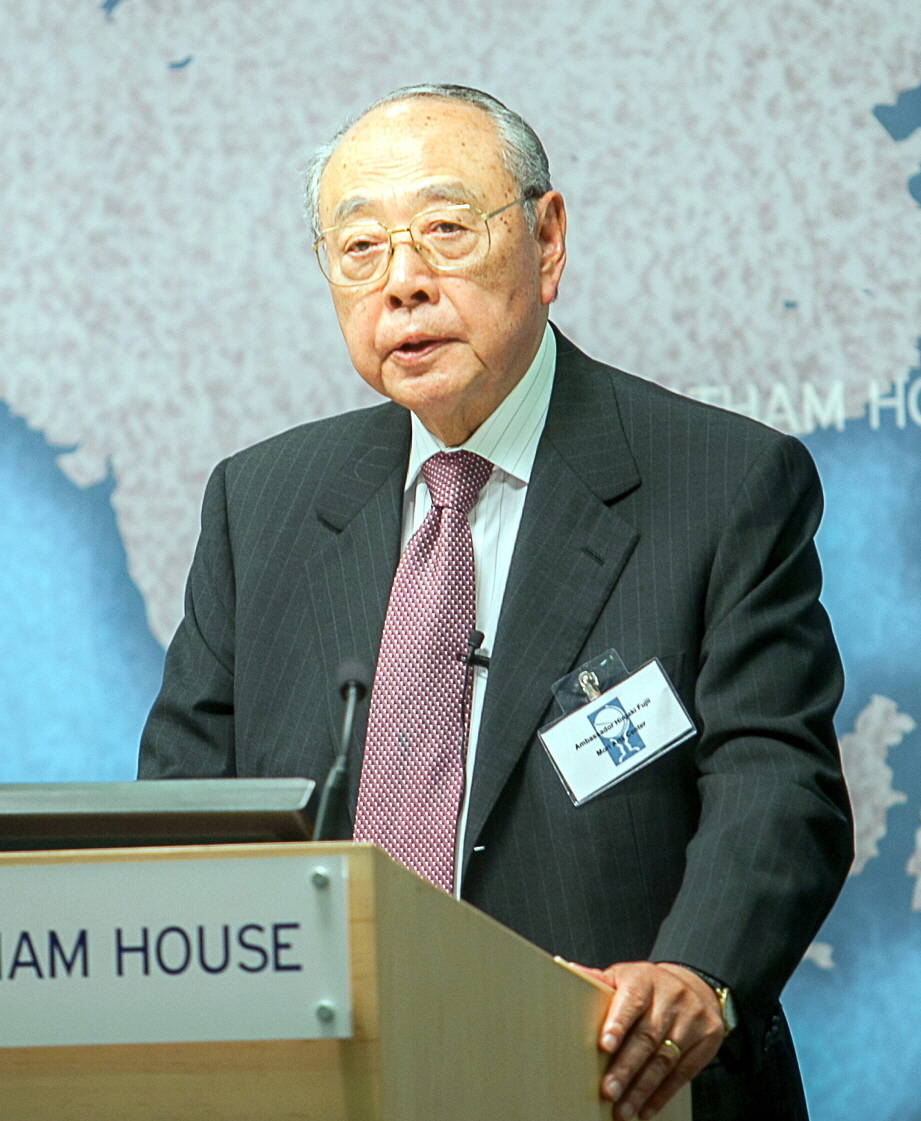
Hiroaki Fujii on 20 June 2013

Hiroaki Fujii (藤井 宏昭, Fujii Hiroaki) is a former Japanese diplomat and current president of the Japan Foundation.

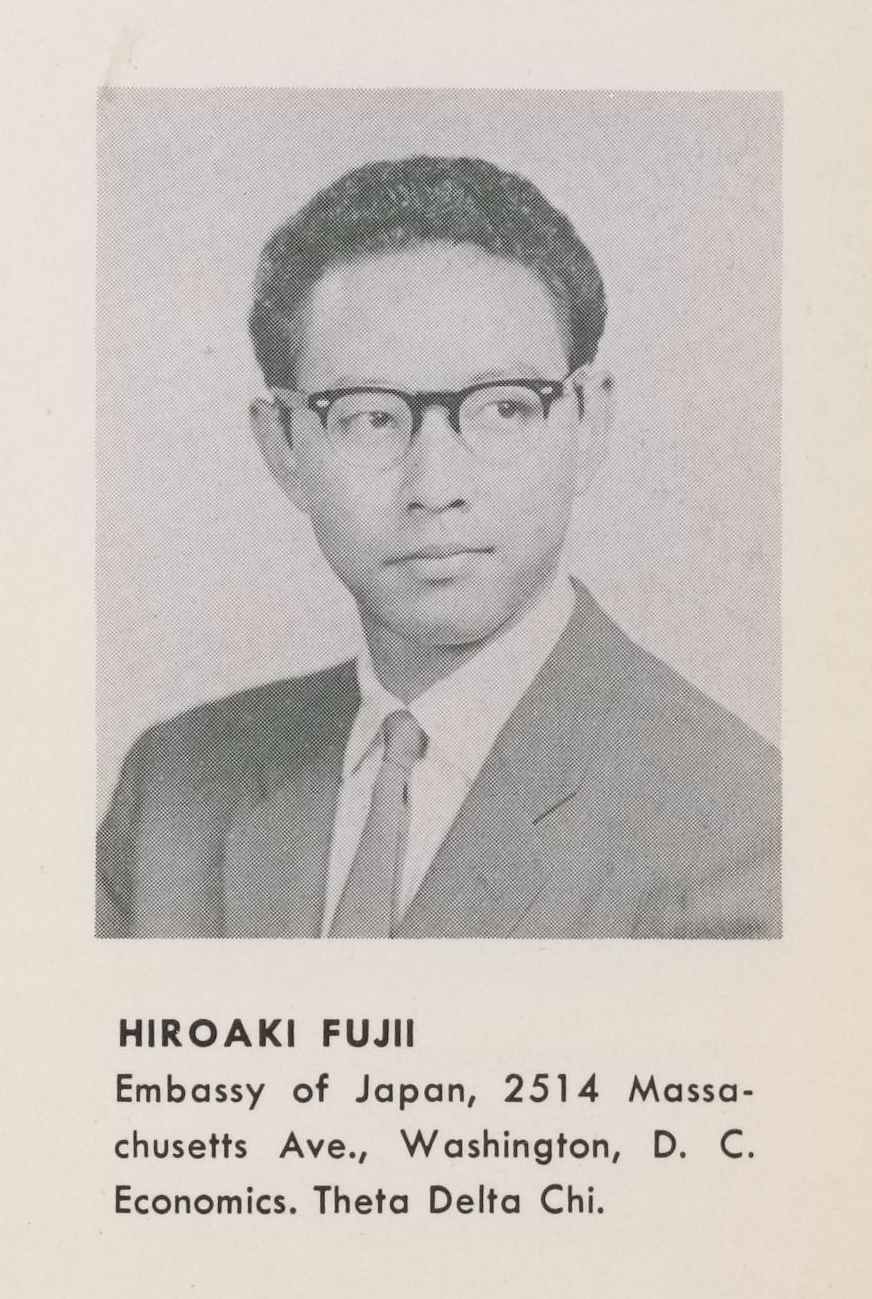
Fujii in the Amherst College yearbook, 1958

He studied at the University of Tokyo, Amherst College and Harvard University.

He entered the Japanese Ministry of Foreign Affairs in 1956. He served as the Japanese ambassador to the Organisation for Economic Co-operation and Development, Thailand and the United Kingdom. In 1997, he became the president of the Japan Foundation.
