= International Alliance of Research Universities =

Research body for universities

The International Alliance of Research Universities (IARU) was launched on 14 January 2006 as a co-operative network of 10 leading, international research-intensive universities who share similar visions for higher education, in particular the education of future leaders. The IARU Chair is elected from among the IARU Presidents for a period of 2 years. Past IARU Chairpersons: At the launch the presidents elected Professor Ian Chubb, 2005 - 2008 (Australian National University); Professor Tan Chorh Chuan, 2009 - 2012 (National University of Singapore); Professor Ralph Eichler, 2013 - 2014 (ETH Zurich); Professor Ralf Hemmingsen, 2015 - 2016 (University of Copenhagen); Professor Nicholas Dirks, 2017 (University of California, Berkeley); Chancellor Carol Christ, 2017 - 2018 (University of California, Berkeley); President Makoto Gonokami, 2018 - 2020 (University of Tokyo); Vice-Chancellor Stephen Toope, 2021-2022 (University of Cambridge); Vice-Chancellor Anthony Freeling (2022–2023). The current chairperson of IARU is Professor Daya Reddy, the Interim Vice-Chancellor of the University of Cape Town.

In January 2016, the University of Cape Town joined as the 11th member.

Its Presidents meet annually at a host university venue to discuss joint initiatives under the following categories:

- Global education initiatives, which includes the flagship Global Summer Program;
- Institutional joint networking;
- Grand Challenge, and most notably its Campus Sustainability; and,
- Research initiatives.

== List of institutions ==
- (Australia) Australian National University
- (Switzerland) ETH Zurich
- National University of Singapore
- (China) Peking University
- (United States) University of California, Berkeley
- (United Kingdom) University of Cambridge
- (South Africa) University of Cape Town
- (Denmark) University of Copenhagen
- (United Kingdom) University of Oxford
- (Japan) University of Tokyo
- (United States) Yale University
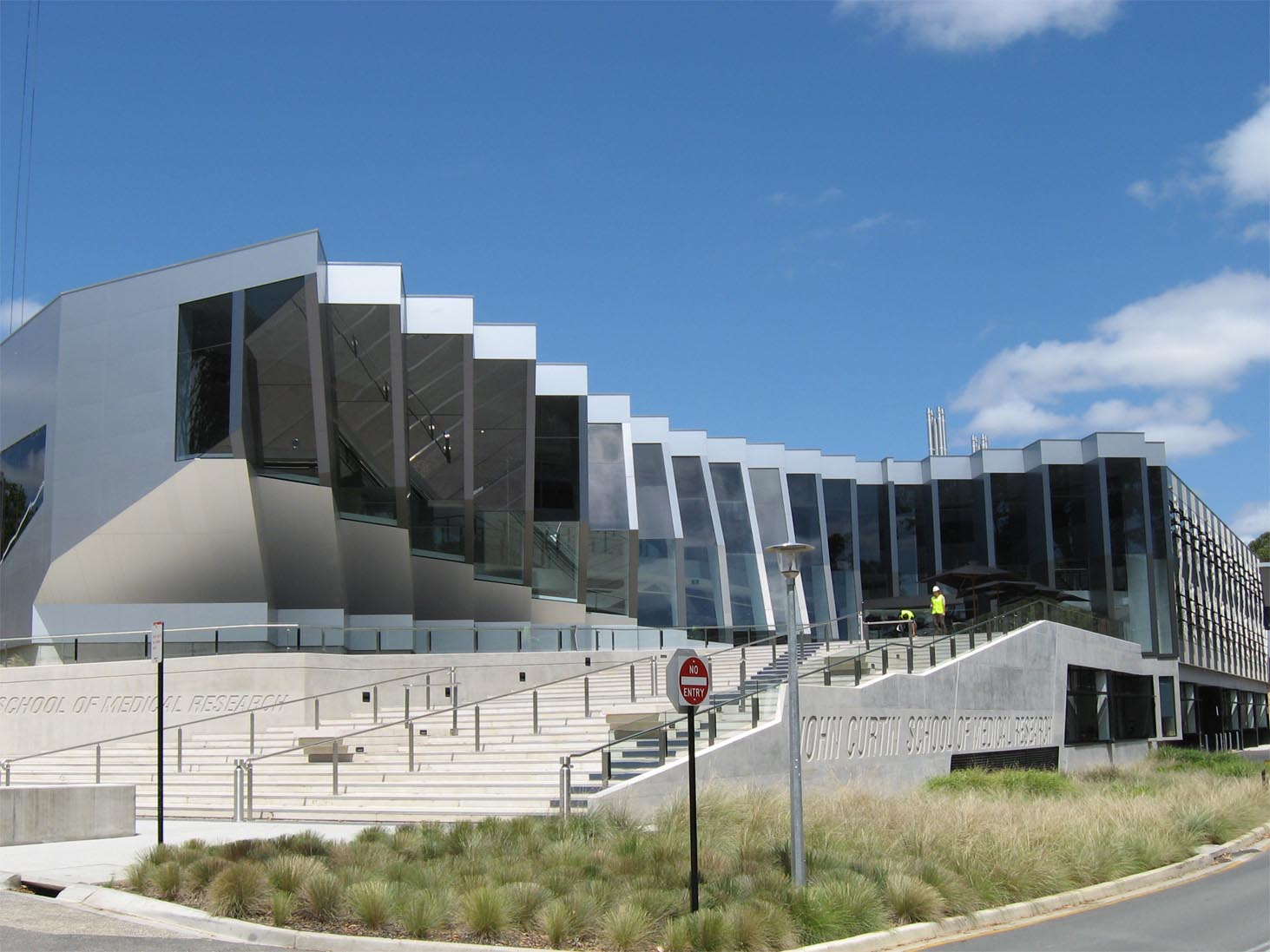
Australian National University

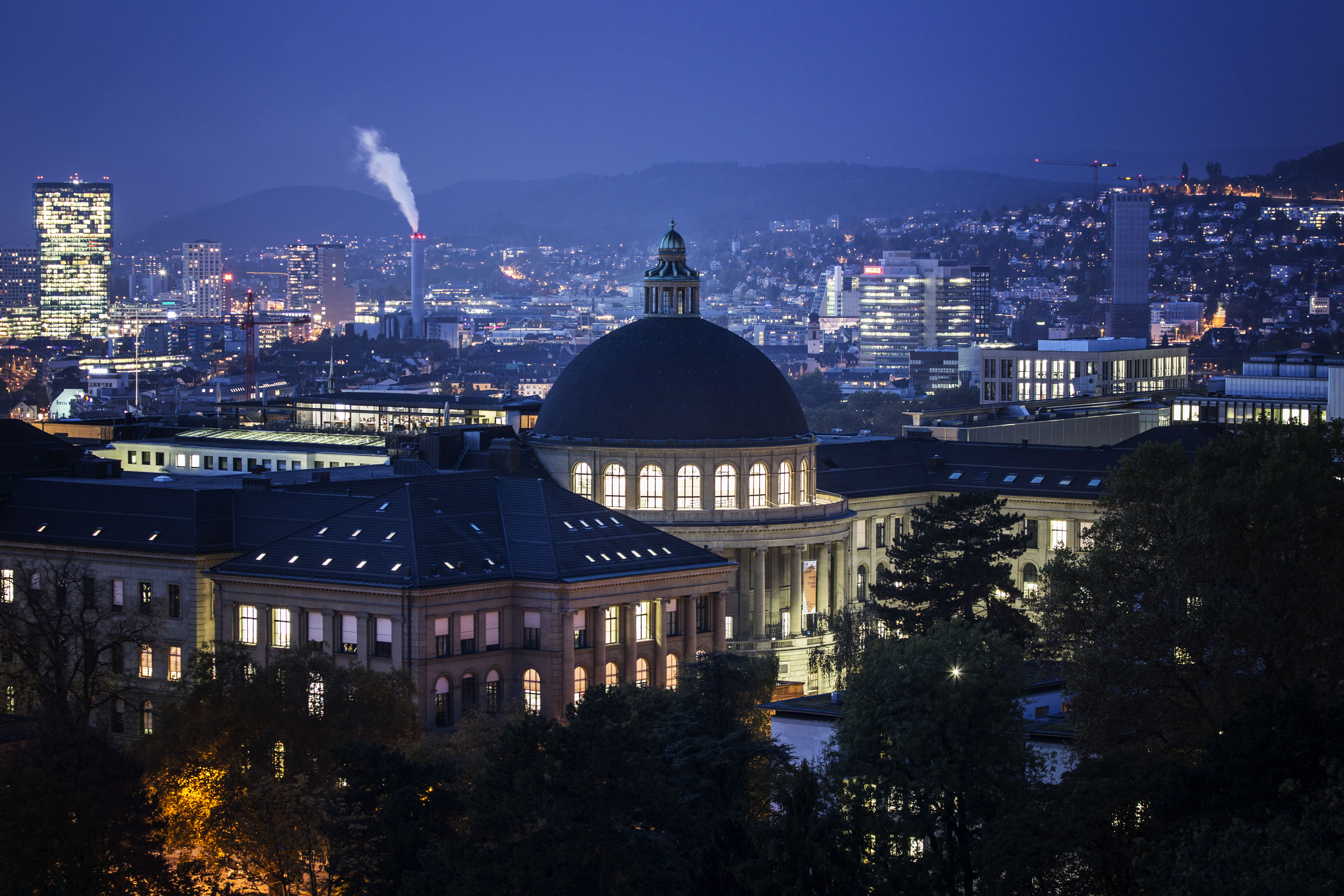
ETH Zürich

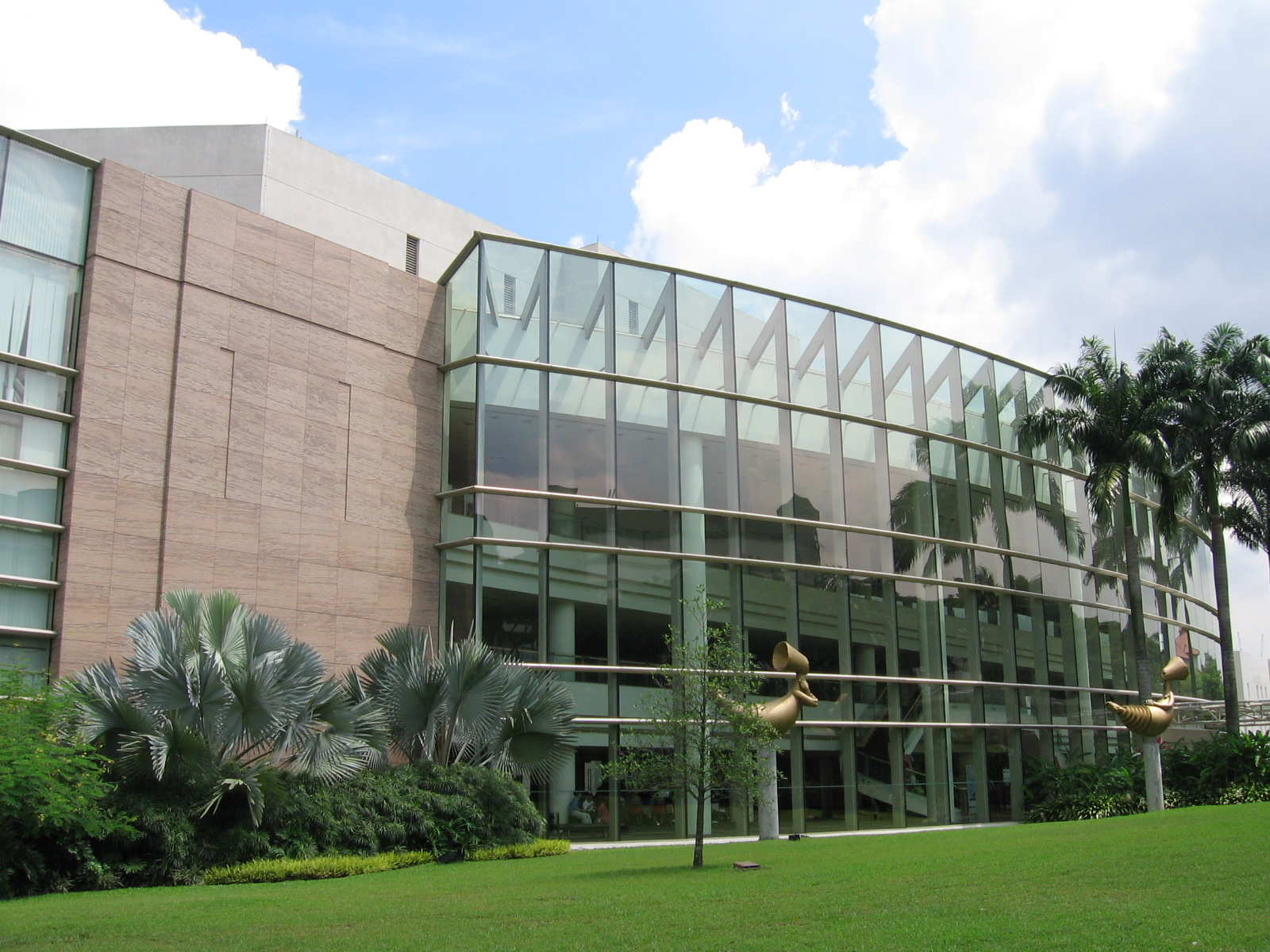
National University of Singapore

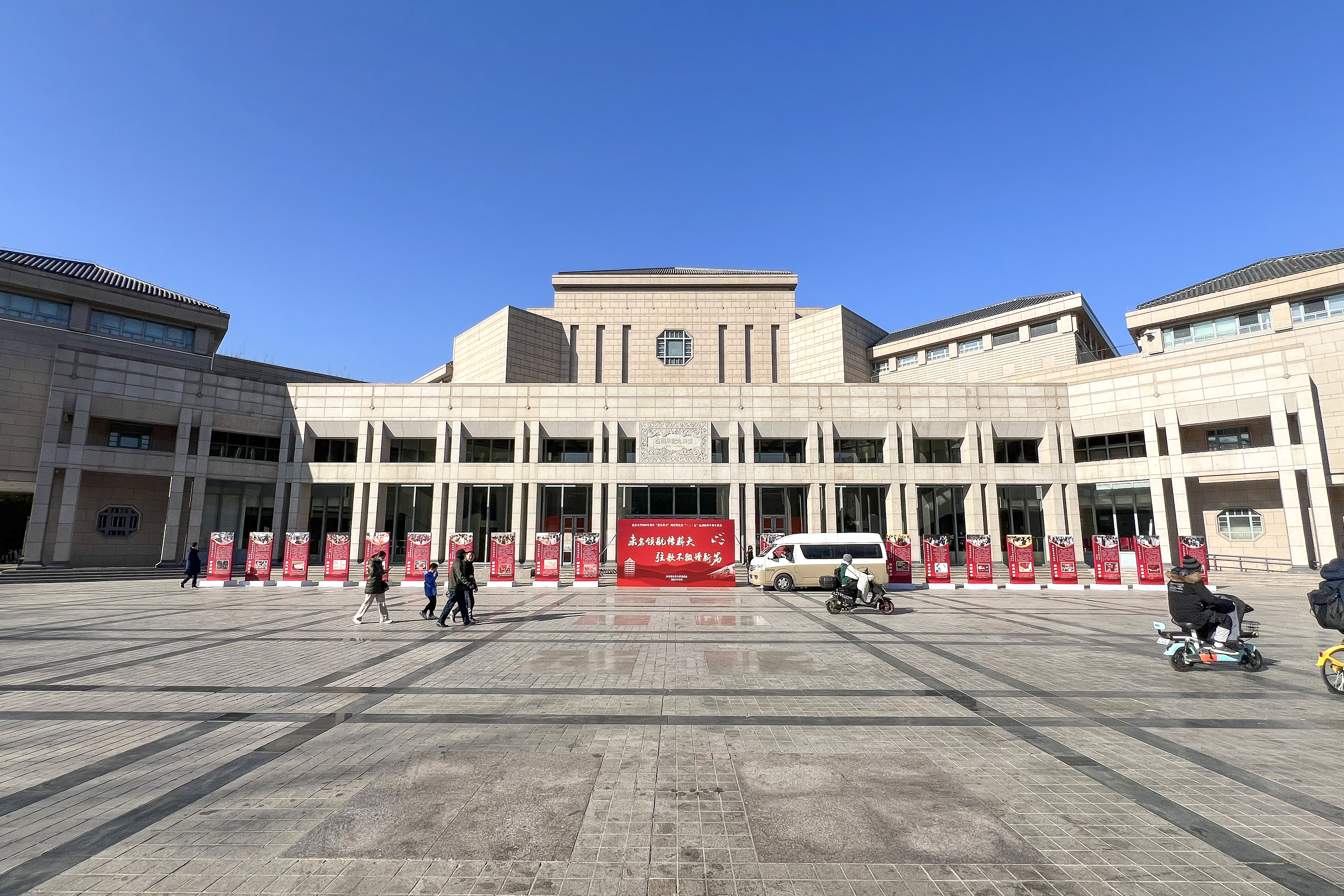
Peking University

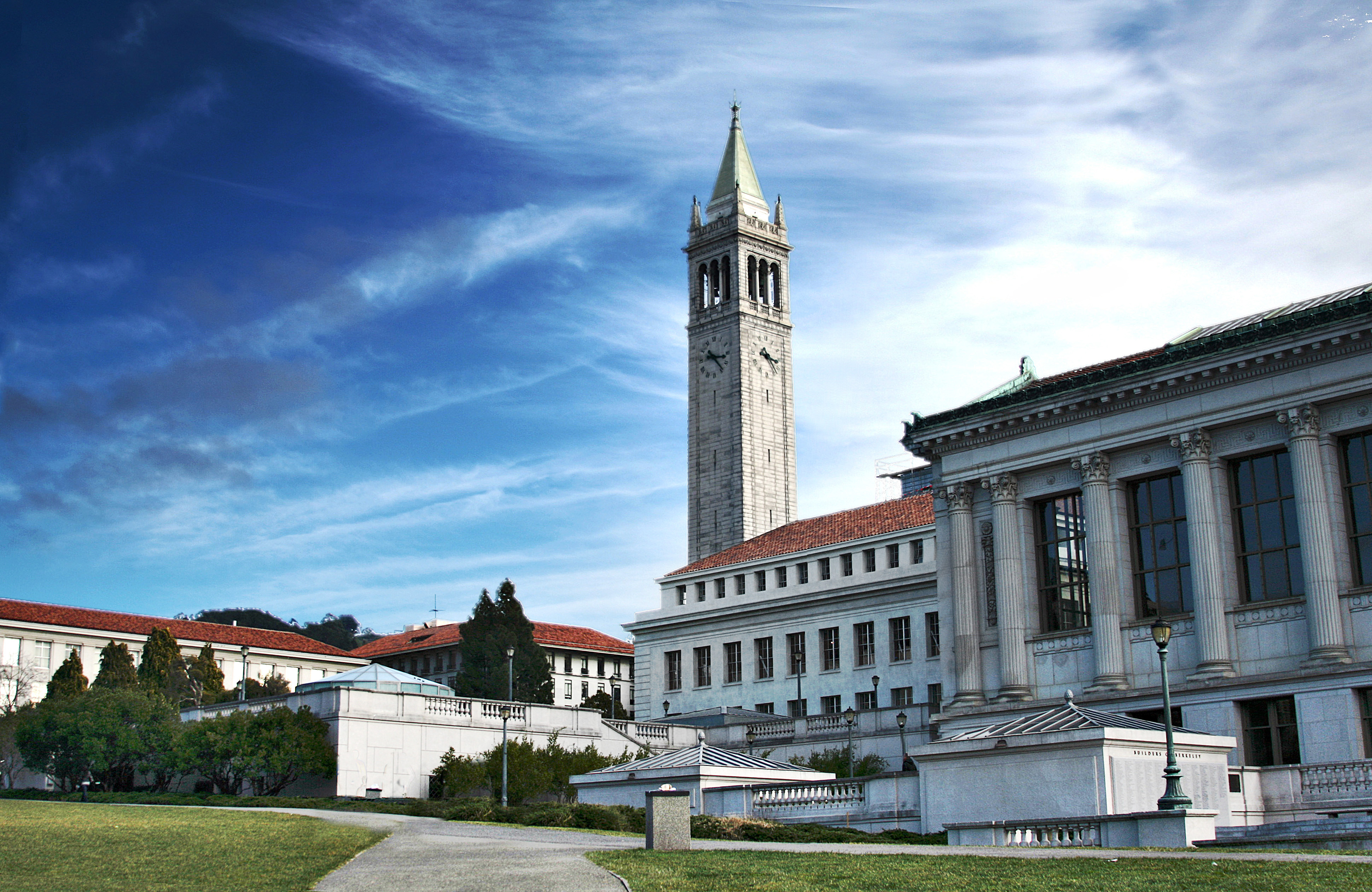
University of California, Berkeley

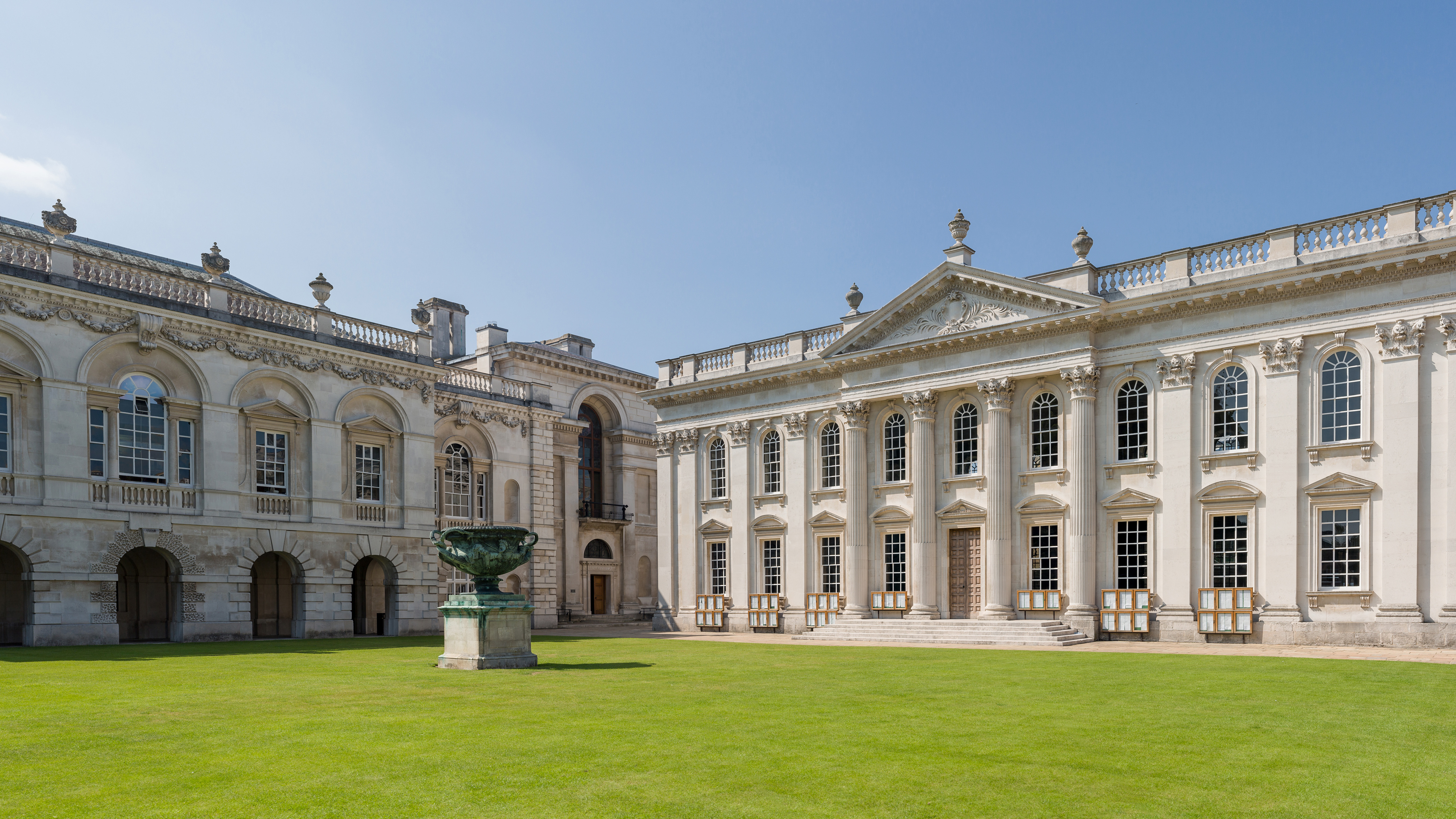
University of Cambridge

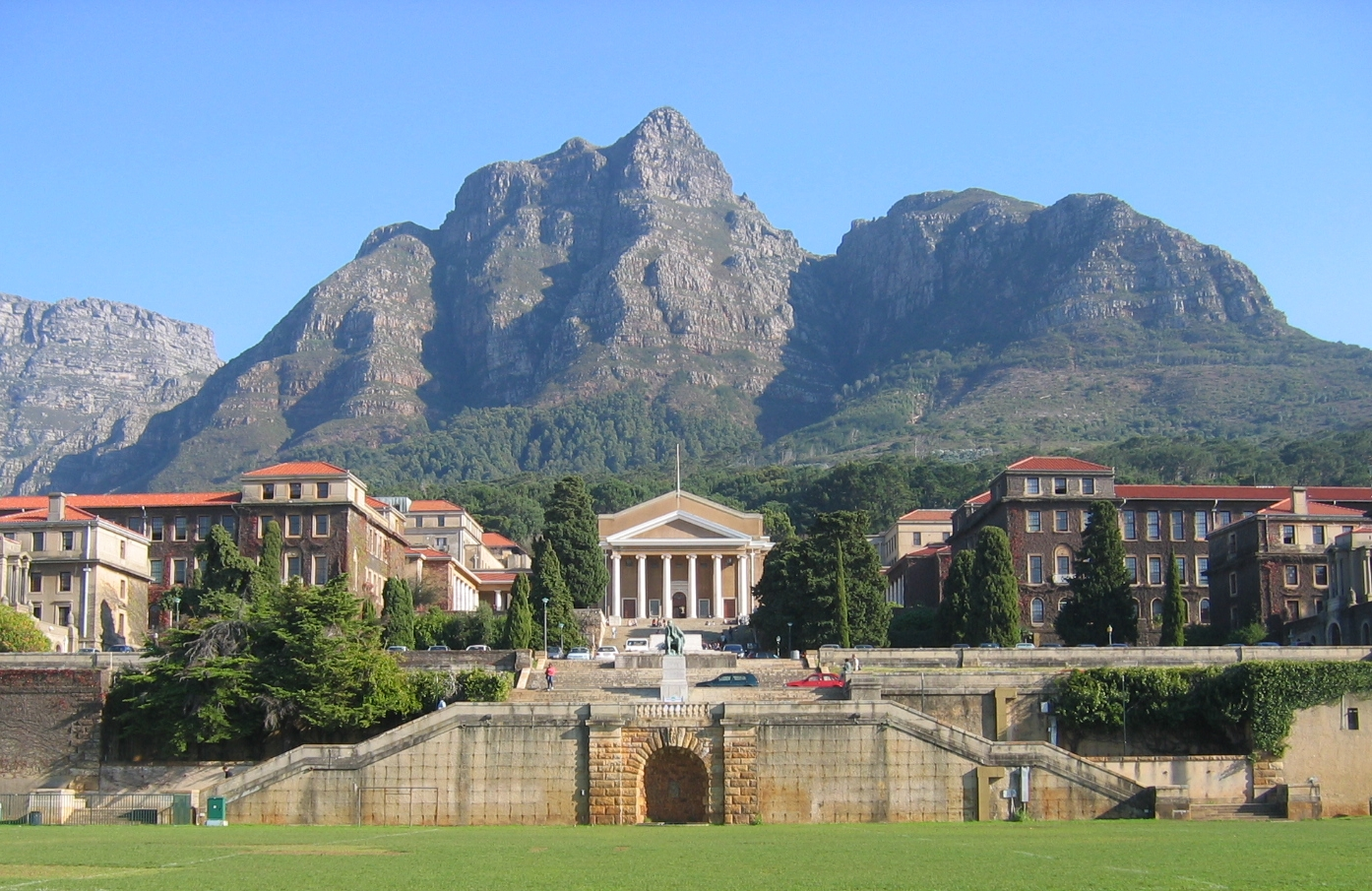
University of Cape Town

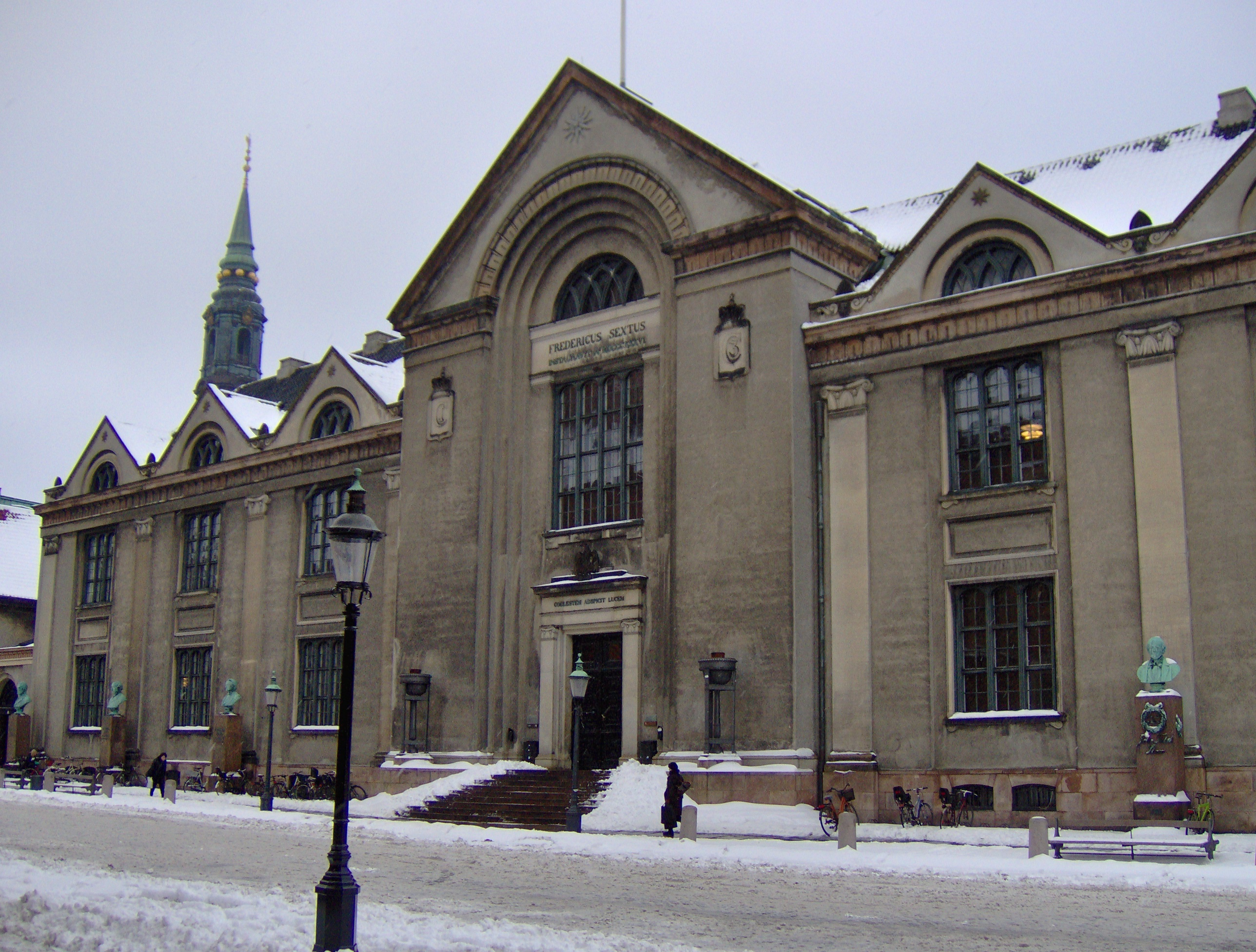
University of Copenhagen

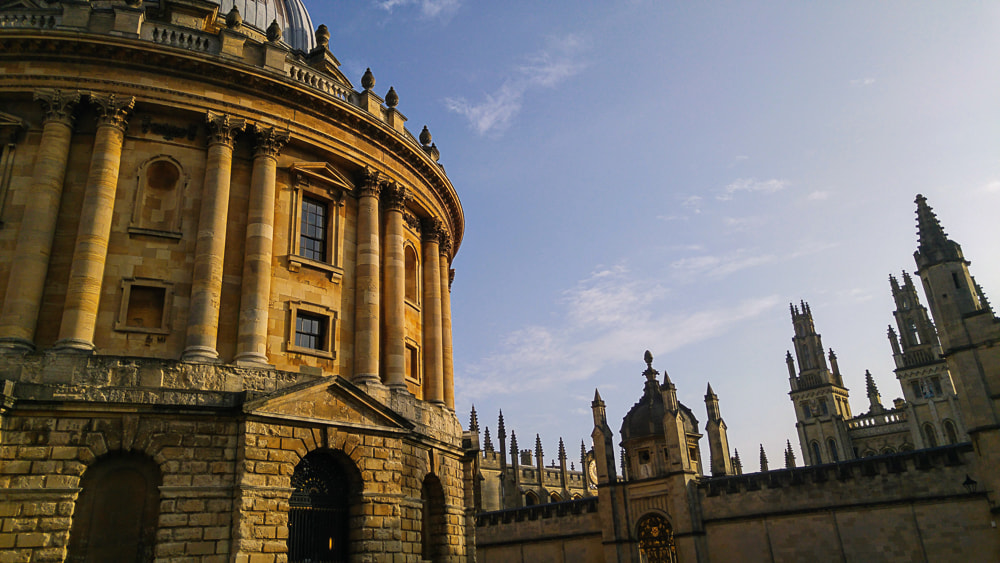
University of Oxford

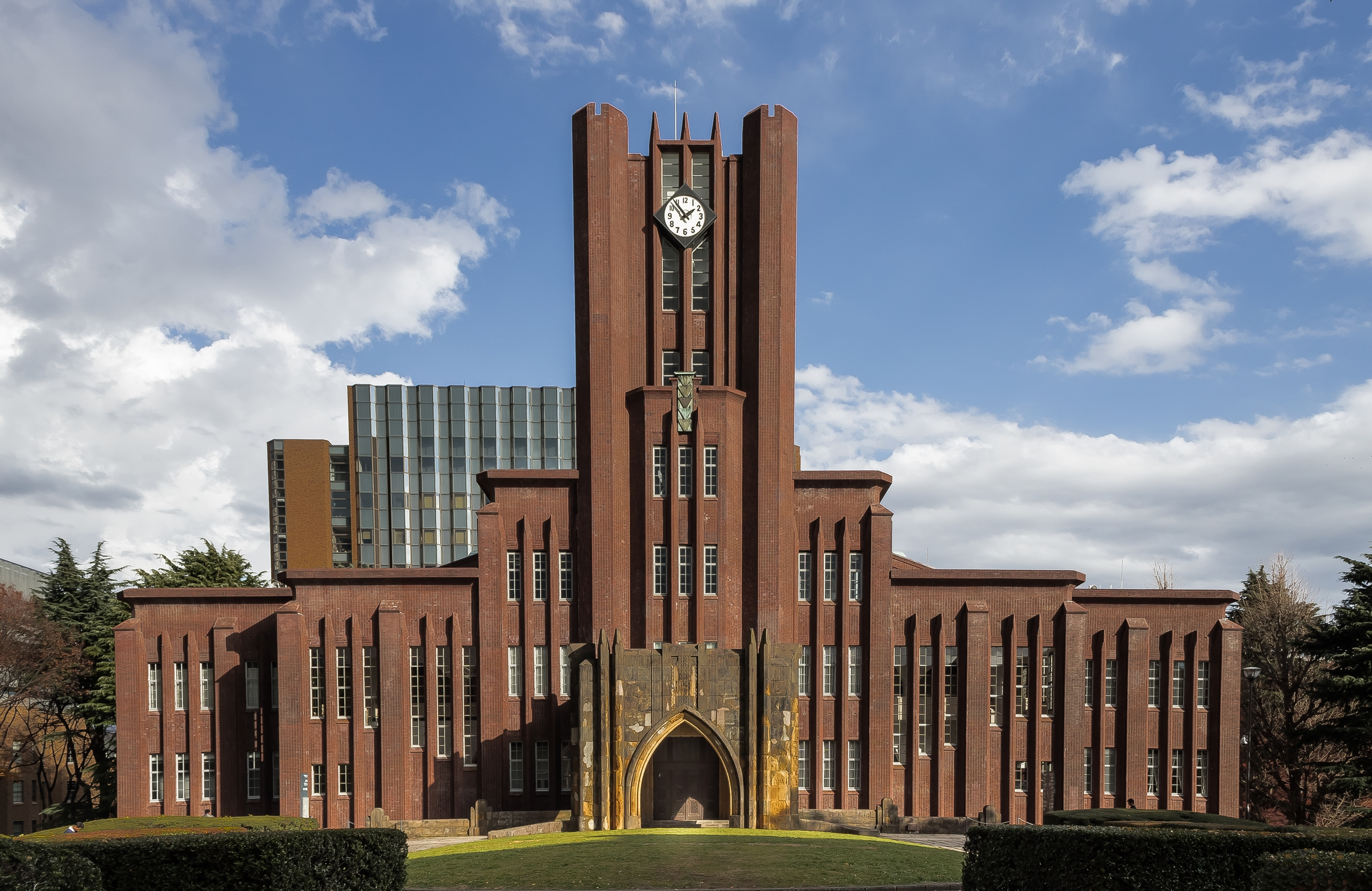
University of Tokyo

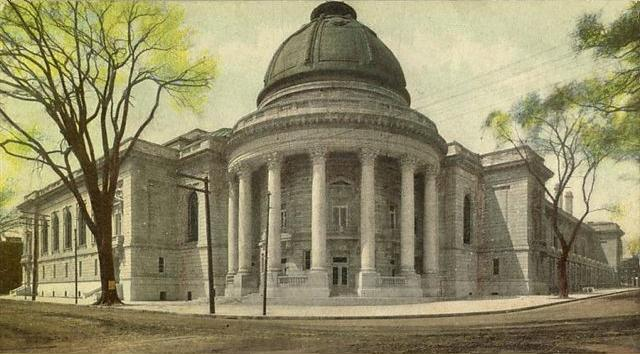
Yale University
