= Hiroshi Fujii =

Japanese engineer

Hiroshi Fujii (藤井 啓史) is the chief engineer and platform manager for the research and development department of manufacturing company Mitsubishi Motors. As the head of a 100-strong team responsible for the continued development of the Mitsubishi Lancer Evolution, he has become known as Dr Evo.

Mitsubishi acknowledged Fujii's contributions at the 2005 Los Angeles Auto Show, when they distributed a comic book featuring a concept car dubbed "Goku Shin Ka" (三菱, Gōku Shin Ka) ("The Ultimate Evolution"). Developed by a character named Dr. Evo as the "perfect Los Angeles-area vehicle", it was a combination of sports car, convertible, pickup truck, and sports utility vehicle. Despite the references to Fujii, the comic book and concept car were both created by staff at Mitsubishi Motors North America's Californian design studio.
