= Fiji, Saudi Arabia =

Fiji
- Village
- Location in Saudi Arabia
- Coordinates: 24°16′N 38°34′E
- Country: Saudi Arabia
- Province: Al Madinah Province
- Time zone: UTC+3 (AST)

Fiji (Arabic: فجي) is a village in Al Madinah Province, in western Saudi Arabia.

== See also ==
- List of cities and towns in Saudi Arabia
- Regions of Saudi Arabia
