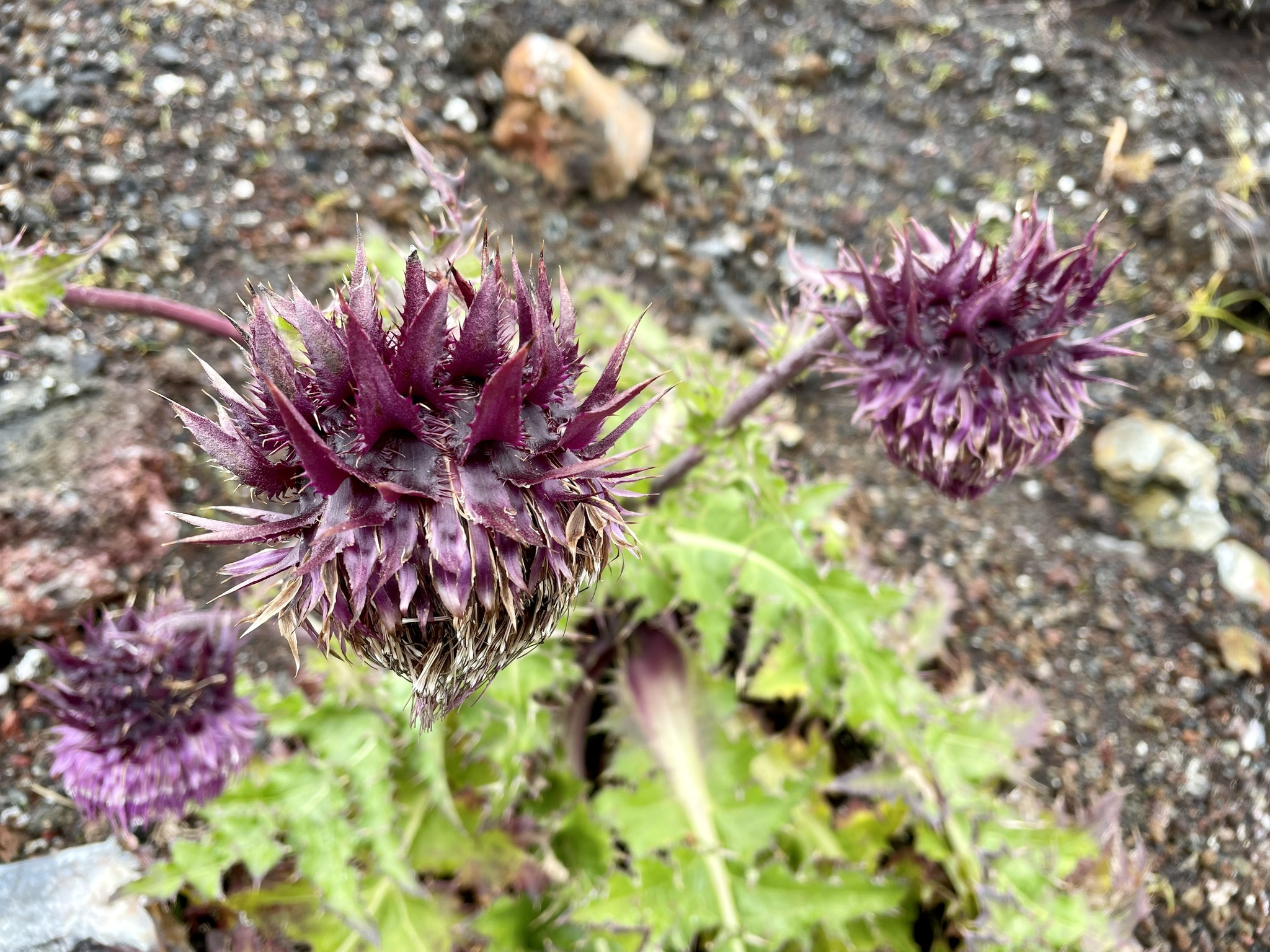

Scientific classification
- Kingdom: Plantae
- Clade: Embryophytes
- Clade: Tracheophytes
- Clade: Angiosperms
- Clade: Eudicots
- Clade: Asterids
- Order: Asterales
- Family: Asteraceae
- Genus: Cirsium
- Species: C. purpuratum

Binomial name
- Cirsium purpuratum (Maxim.) Matsum., 1895

Synonyms
- Cnicus purpuratus Maxim., 1879

= Cirsium purpuratum =

Species of plant

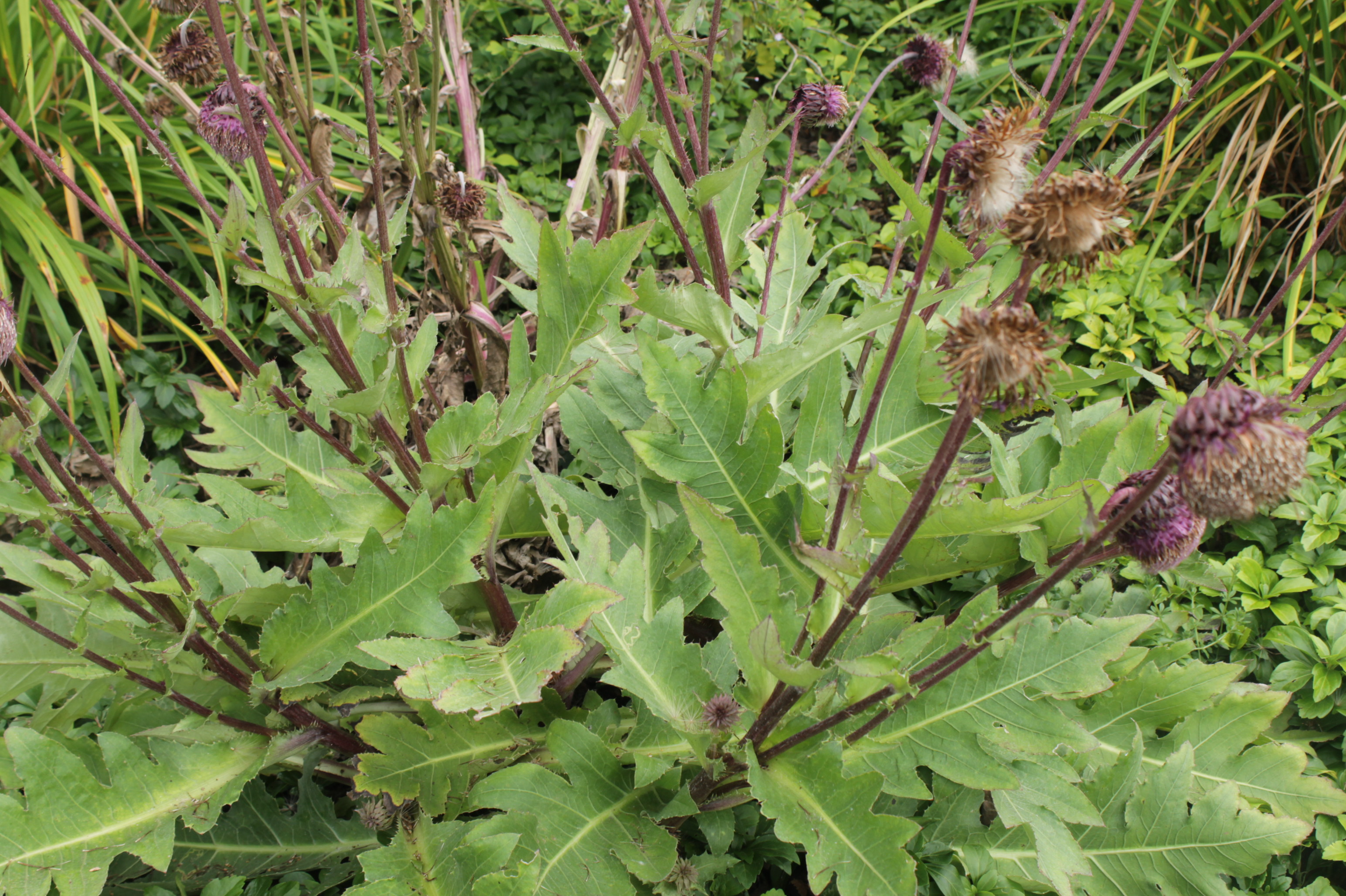
Foliage, Cirsium purpuratum

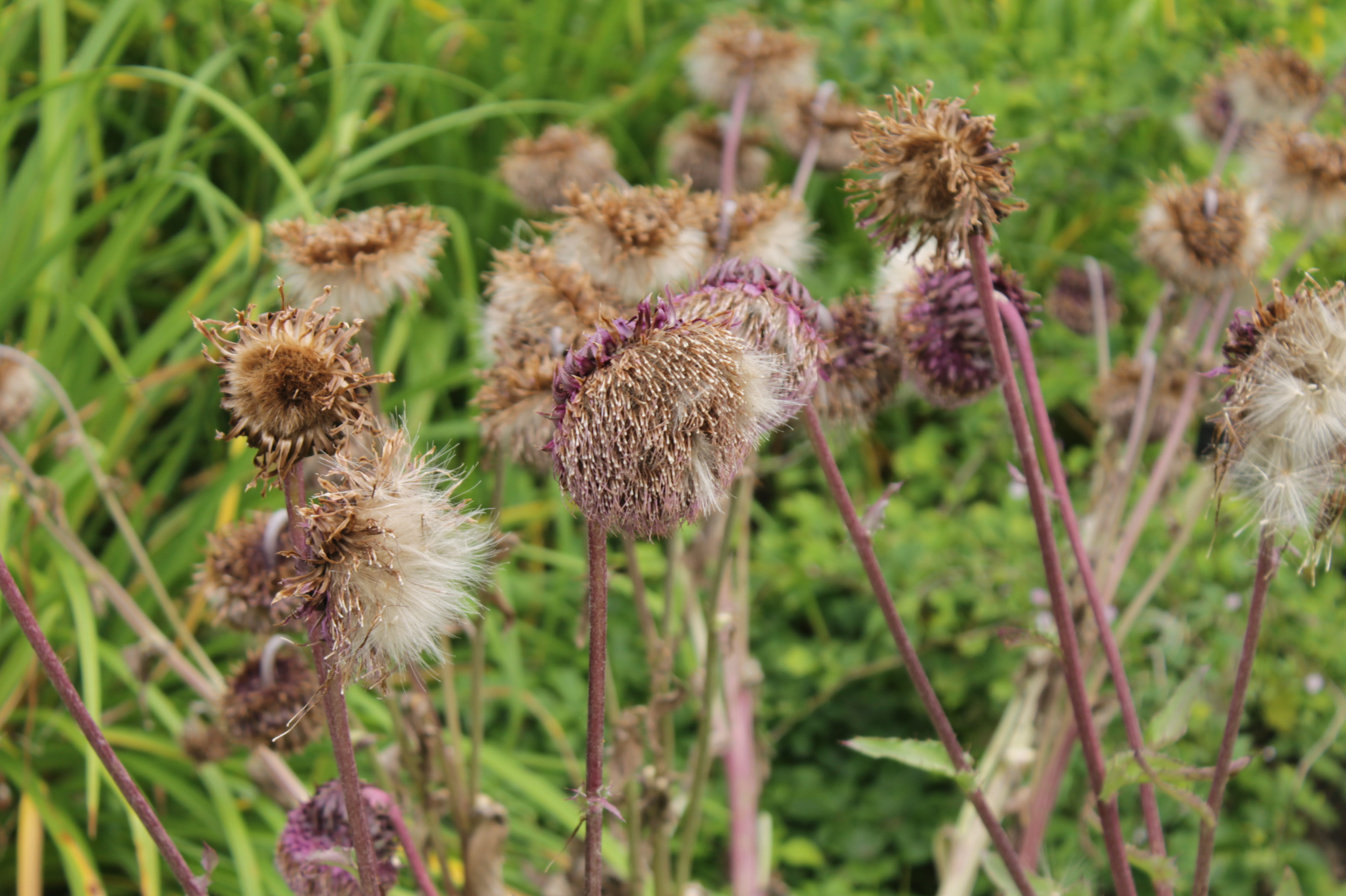
Dead flowerheads, Cirsium purpuratum

Cirsium purpuratum, also known as Fuji thistle, is a species of plume thistle native to Japan.

The plant grows to around 1.5m in height and the flower heads are up to 10 cm in diameter.
