= Henry Hajimu Fujii =

American community leader (1886–1976)

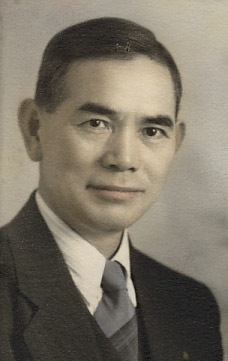
- Born: August 17, 1886; Takashiro, Tottori Prefecture, Japan
- Died: November 4, 1976 (aged 90); Nampa, Idaho, United States
- Occupation(s): Farmer, lapidary, spokesman
- Spouse: Fumiko (Mayeda) Fujii (1891-1984)
- Children: 6

Henry Hajimu Fujii (Japanese: 藤井 肇, August 17, 1886 – November 4, 1976) was a pioneer and Japanese American community leader in the state of Idaho. His primary vocation was in agriculture. In the 1930s, Fujii was recognized as a pioneer in large-scale onion farming, advancing the acreage scale of which a farmer could raise crops. In 1936, he established the Japanese Onion Growers Association and served as the organization's president for over 30 years.

As a Japanese immigrant living away from the West Coast of the United States, Fujii was not part of the Japanese American internment, maintaining a residence in Nampa, Idaho, throughout World War II. Although he, like most other Japanese Americans, was the subject of significant racial persecution in the mid-1940s, Fujii maintained strong community relationships and leadership. His community presence served as a significant contributor to the well-being and rights preservation for Asians in the northwestern United States. The Emperor of Japan awarded Fujii the 6th Order of the Rising Sun, Silver Rays, which represents the sixth highest of eight classes associated with this award. This decoration was presented as a way of acknowledging his efforts in furthering the relationships between Japan and the United States.

In his retirement, Fujii turned to rockhounding and amassed one of the most extensive gem and mineral collections in the northwestern United States. In 1974, Fujii donated a portion of his collection to the State of Idaho, with Governor Cecil D. Andrus personally accepting the donation. The remainder of Fujii's gem and mineral specimens were donated to the Idaho Museum of Mining and Geology in 1994, and is on permanent display as "The Fujii Collection" in Boise, ID.

== Background ==
Hajimu Fujii was born August 17, 1886, in Tottori Prefecture, Japan. He was the fifth son to Yasujiro and Tsune Fujii. As a boy, he helped raise rice and silkworms on their one-ox, 3-acre (12,000 m^{2}) farm. In high school, Fujii and a classmate decided to immigrate to America upon finishing school. Hajimu, whose name means "The Beginning," didn't pass his physical examination because of an eye infection, so his classmate, Katsuji Hashitani, went on to America alone. Fujii taught school for a year while returning to full health and borrowed $500 for his fare to America.

Fujii left Japan for America at the beginning of April 1906 on the ship Keemun. After an 18-day voyage he arrived in Victoria, British Columbia, Canada. He continued on his journey by train to Vancouver, British Columbia, finally arriving in Seattle, Washington, on May 1 where he joined Hashitani. Hashitani told Fujii that his first name was difficult for Americans to pronounce, so he'd taken the name Henry. Hajimu, not knowing any other common U.S. names, took the name Henry as well.

In December 1908, Fujii partnered with Hashitani and George Shigeya Takeuchi, assuming a lease of an 80-acre (320,000 m^{2}) farm and house in Emmett, ID. They raised vegetables and fruit, and supplied produce by horse and wagon to the town of Emmett, and Pearl, a nearby gold mine camp. During each winter farming off-season, Fujii, Hashitani, and Takeuchi studied English, taking lessons three nights a week with a local church pastor.

Within five years of arriving in the U.S., Fujii had paid back the $500 he had borrowed to come to America and amassed $500 in savings, as well as funding to return to Japan to get married. On December 29, 1911, he married Fumiko Mayeda at Takashiro, Tottori-ken, Japan. Fumiko Mayeda was born on July 12, 1891, at Kochi, Maniwa, Okayama Prefecture, Japan. She was the daughter of a history teacher Fujii had admired when he was a teacher. Fujii returned to the U.S. with his new bride, traveling aboard the SS Inaba Maru and arriving on April 23, 1912.

== Japanese land law ==
Fujii's ability to purchase land was partly due to his own efforts in fighting the alien land law that had been introduced in the Idaho State Legislature in 1915. Eight years after joining the Japanese Association of Western Idaho (JAWI), Fujii was elected president. His election was the beginning of a 26-year leadership for the JAWI. The association's usual activities involved such matters as arranging trips to Japan, marriages, funerals, and buying property.

One of the most serious matters of the JAWI was that of the Japanese land law. California, Oregon, Washington, and other western states had passed laws that prohibited Japanese from owning or leasing land. Idaho's five Japanese associations organized a federation and elected Fujii, as well as other representatives, to fight a similar law in Idaho. This team successfully lobbied to delay passage of the law, defeat it, and introduce a new law. This new law allowed renewable leases of up to five years. With its passage in 1923, Idaho remained the only state in the West where Japanese immigrants could lease land.
