= Teruo Fujii =

President of the University of Tokyo

- 藤井 輝夫
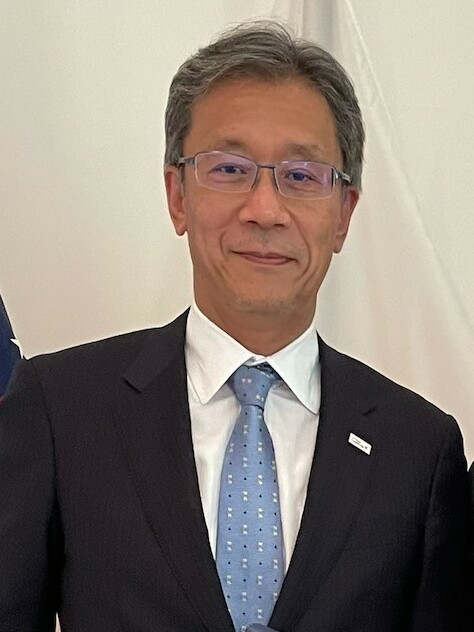

31st President of the University of Tokyo
- Incumbent
- Assumed office April 2021
- Preceded by: Makoto Gonokami

Director General of the Institute of Industrial Science
- In office 2015–2018

Personal details
- Born: April 5, 1964 (age 62) Zürich, Switzerland
- Education: University of Tokyo (PhD)
- Occupation: University professor Researcher

Teruo Fujii (藤井 輝夫, Fujii Teruo; born 5 April 1964) is a Japanese professor of Engineering and Applied Microfluidic Systems and the 31st President of the University of Tokyo. Since 2007 he has served as a professor at the Institute of Industrial Science (IIS) of the university (Director General of the institute from 2015 to 2018 ) has been conducting research on Microfluidics.^{[a]} He received his Ph.D. in engineering from the University of Tokyo (1993). Fujii was also co-director of LIMMS-CNRS/IIS, a joint research lab between CNRS, France, and IIS, from 2007 to 2014. He served as the President of The Chemical and Biological Microsystems Society(CBMS).

In April 2021, Fujii succeeded Makoto Gonokami, who retired in 2021, as the President of the University.

On 30 September 2021, Fujii announced "UTokyo Compass", as a statement of the guiding principles of the University of Tokyo, sub-titled "Into a Sea of Diversity: Creating the Future through Dialogue". He emphasized that it was not only a mission statement like those announced by successive presidents each time they take office. He presented UTokyo Compass as a basic framework that scholars, researchers and student could use to set a course with a view to solving global issues by fundamentally elaborating questions and dialogues from the standpoint of academics.

When Fujii took office as President of the UTokyo, he set "Diversity & Inclusion" as one of the pillars to formulate new action guidelines, and made an epoch-making personnel affairs in which the composition of directors of the new executive department (including the president) is a majority of women.

Fujii has served as an executive member of the Cabinet Office's Council for Science, Technology and Innovation (CSTI) since 2021.

== Notes ==
a. Fujii says that his motivation for Microfluidic Devices research was that when he was a senior research scientist at RIKEN in the late 1990s, his boss encouraged him to find a new research field.

Academic offices
Preceded by Makoto Gonokami	President of University of Tokyo; April 2021 – present
