= Society of Women Engineers =

American educational and service organization

- Formation: May 27, 1950; 75 years ago
- Type: Engineering Society
- Headquarters: Chicago, Illinois
- Region served: International
- Website: swe.org

The Society of Women Engineers (SWE) is an international not-for-profit educational and service organization. Founded in 1950 and headquartered in the United States, the Society of Women Engineers is a major advocate for women in engineering and technology. SWE has over 47,000 members in nearly 100 professional sections, 300 collegiate sections, and 60 global affiliate groups throughout the world.

== Antecedents ==
The SWE archives contain a series of letters from the Elsie Eaves Papers (bequeathed to the Society), which document the origins of the Society in the early 20th century. In 1919, a group of women at the University of Colorado helped establish a small community of women with an engineering or science background, called the American Society of Women Engineers and Architects. While this organization was only recognized within the campus community, it set the foundation for the development of the international Society of Women Engineers. This group included Lou Alta Melton, Hilda Counts, and Elsie Eaves. These women wrote letters to engineering schools across the nation asking for information on female engineering students and graduates. They received responses from 139 women throughout 23 universities. They also received many negative responses from schools that did not admit women into their engineering programs. From the University of North Carolina, Thorndike Saville, Associate Professor of Sanitary Engineering wrote: "I would state that we have not now, have never had, and do not expect to have in the near future, any women students registered in our engineering department." Some responses were generally supportive of women in engineering, but not of a separate society in particular. North Carolina State University's Dean Blake R Van Leer felt differently and encouraged future SWE president Katharine Stinson to be one of the first women to enroll and his daughter Maryly would later open a branch.

Many of the women contacted as a result of the inquiries wrote about their support for such an organization. Besides the Hazel Quick letter from Michigan, there was a reply from Alice Goff, expressing her support of the idea of a society for women in engineering and architecture: "Undoubtedly an organization of such a nature would be of great benefit to all members, especially to those just entering the profession." The women in Michigan organized a group in 1914 called the T-Square Society. Although it was not clear if this group was a business, honorary, or social organization, it was proposed as a safe space for women to collaborate and share their ideas comfortably.

== History ==
Though the Society of Women Engineers did not become a formal organization until 1950, its origins date to the late 1940s, when shortages of men due to World War II provided new opportunities for women to pursue employment in engineering. Female student groups at Drexel Institute of Technology in Philadelphia and at Cooper Union and City College of New York in New York City began forming local meetings and networking activities. On April 3, 1949, seventy students attended a conference at Drexel to start organizing. These seventy students traveled from 19 universities. National vice president Maryly Van Leer Peck and her mother Ella Lillian Wall Van Leer a women's right activist became heavily involved early on. They opened one of the first branches at Georgia Tech after her father Blake R Van Leer successfully lobbied to allow women to attend. Blake also encouraged numerous women to join his engineering program while at NC State. The Van Leers would actively support the organization throughout their lives.

On the weekend of May 27–28, 1950, about fifty women representing the four original districts of the Society of Women Engineers – New York City, Philadelphia, Washington, D.C., and Boston – met for the first national meeting at The Cooper Union's Green Engineering Camp in northern New Jersey. During this first meeting, the society elected the first president of SWE, Beatrice Hicks. The first official annual meeting was held in 1951, in New York City.

In 1957, the USSR launched Sputnik and widespread interest in technological research and development intensified. This caused many engineering schools to begin admitting women. Membership in SWE doubled to 1,200 and SWE moved its headquarters to the United Engineering Center, in New York City.

Over the next decade, an increasing number of young women chose engineering as a profession, but few were able to rise to management-level positions. SWE inaugurated a series of conferences (dubbed the Henniker Conferences after the meeting site in New Hampshire) on the status of women in engineering, and in 1973 signed an agreement with the National Society of Professional Engineers in hopes of recruiting a larger percentage of working women and students to its ranks.

At the same time, SWE increasingly became involved in the spirit and activities of the larger women's movement. In 1972, a number of representatives from women's scientific and technical committees and societies (including SWE) met to form an alliance and discuss equity for women in science and engineering. This inaugural meeting eventually led to the formation of the Business and Professional Women's Foundation (BPWF). In addition, SWE's council resolved in 1973 to endorse ratification of the Equal Rights Amendment, and a few years later, resolved not to hold national conventions in non-ERA-ratified states. The Equal Rights Amendment was first proposed by Alice Paul in the 1920s, after women gained the right to vote, and still has not been ratified to this day.

By 1982, the Society had swelled to 13,000 graduate and student members spread out over 250 sections across the country. The Council of Section Representatives, which in partnership with an Executive Committee had governed the Society since 1959, had become so large that SWE adopted a regionalization plan designed to bring the leadership closer to the membership. Today, SWE has over 47,000 collegiate and professional members and continues its mission as a 501(c)(3) non-profit educational service organization.

The Society of Women Engineers organization exists today largely because the gender balance in engineering does not proportionally reflect population breakdowns of men and women. Encouragement of female students and promotion of engineering as a field of study for women is a necessary and fundamental function of the organization. Engineering and related fields are heavily male-dominated, in part because of gender socialization and artificially reinforced gender norms. Theories such as the STEM pipeline seek to understand and balance how different science, math, and engineering fields tend to over- or under-represent different groups of people in the United States. The Van Leer family still supports the organization to this day.

== Mission ==
The SWE's mission statement is to "Empower women to achieve full potential in careers as engineers and leaders, expand the image of the engineering and technology professions as a positive force in improving the quality of life, and demonstrate the value of diversity and inclusion." The organization is open to every gender and background in an effort to support and promote diversity.

The Society of Women Engineers awards multiple scholarships each year to women in undergraduate and graduate STEM degree programs. In 2019, SWE disbursed nearly 260 new and renewed scholarships valued at more than $810,000. Because the Society is a not-for-profit organization, its scholarships are funded by private donations and corporate sponsors. SWE's CEO and executive director Karen Horting stated that SWE "could not have such a successful program without our corporate and foundation partners and generous individuals who support our scholarships, and our hope is to continue to grow the program and provide financial resources to those studying for a career in engineering and technology."

== Archives ==
While developing the Society, the organizers assembled masses of information into archives. A committee for these archives was established in 1953. The Society's archives were established in 1957 by the Archives Committee, who voluntarily collected and maintained the Society's records. The archives are currently located at the Walter P. Reuther Library at Wayne State University in Detroit, Michigan. Some of the media includes information about a short-lived society involving both architects and engineers from 1920. The archives detail the history and creation of SWE as an organization and the history of women's involvement in engineering. Due to these collections of women's work on scientific projects, the archives show an alternate perspective on events such as the Space Race, which have traditionally been viewed as male-dominated endeavors but depended on the contributions of many women as well. In 1993, SWE designated the Walter P. Reuther Library as the official repository of its historical materials.

Located within the Carey C. Shuart Women's Archive and Research Collection, the Houston Area Section of the Society of Women Engineers contains correspondence, business and financial records, photographs, and publications of the organization.

== Current work ==
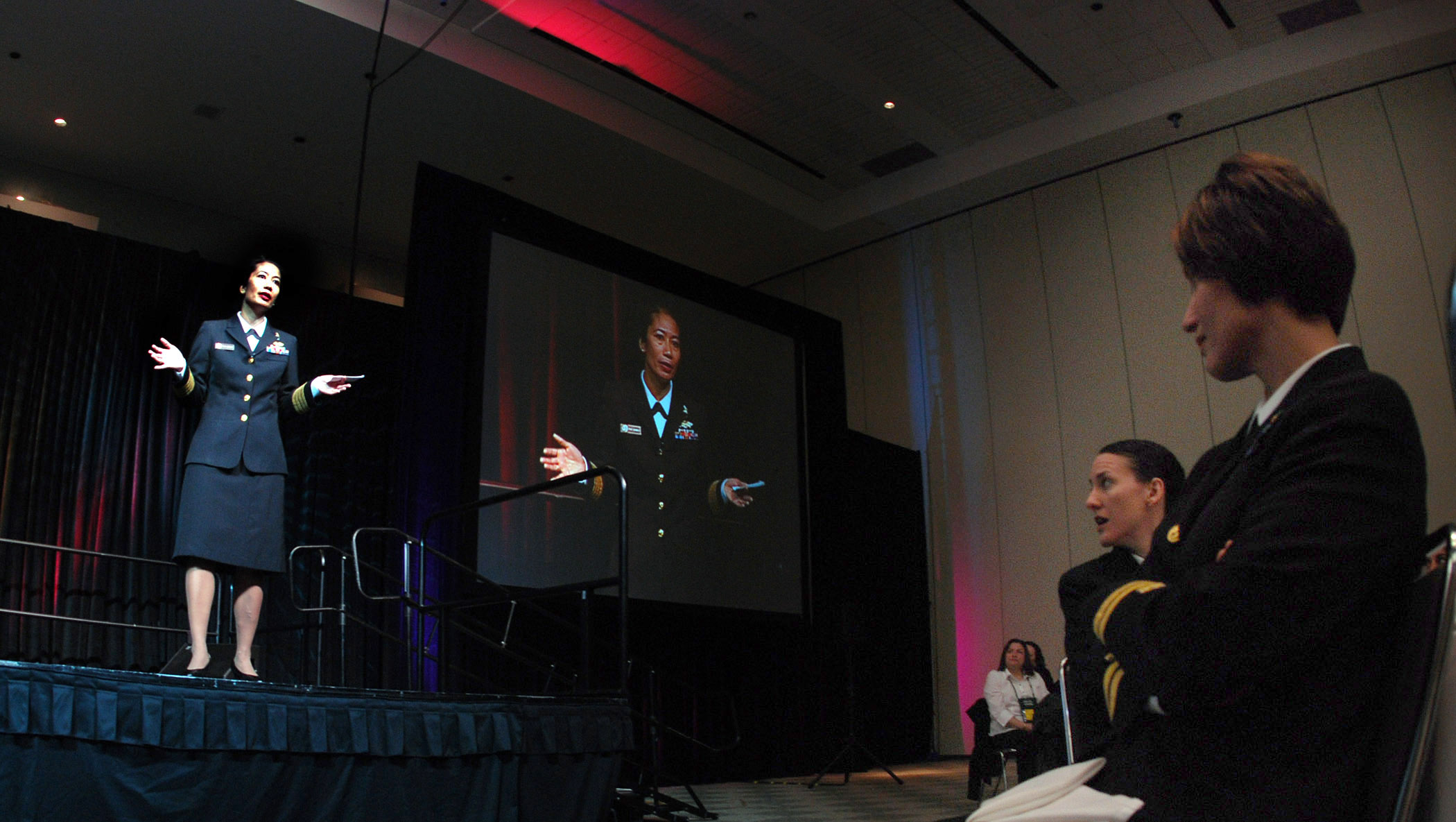
United States Navy Captain Paz B. Gomez delivers the keynote address at the Society of Women Engineers conference in Baltimore

SWE offers support at all levels, from K-12 outreach programs and collegiate sections to professional development in the workplace. Programs are in place to help collegiate and professional members interact with their local communities.

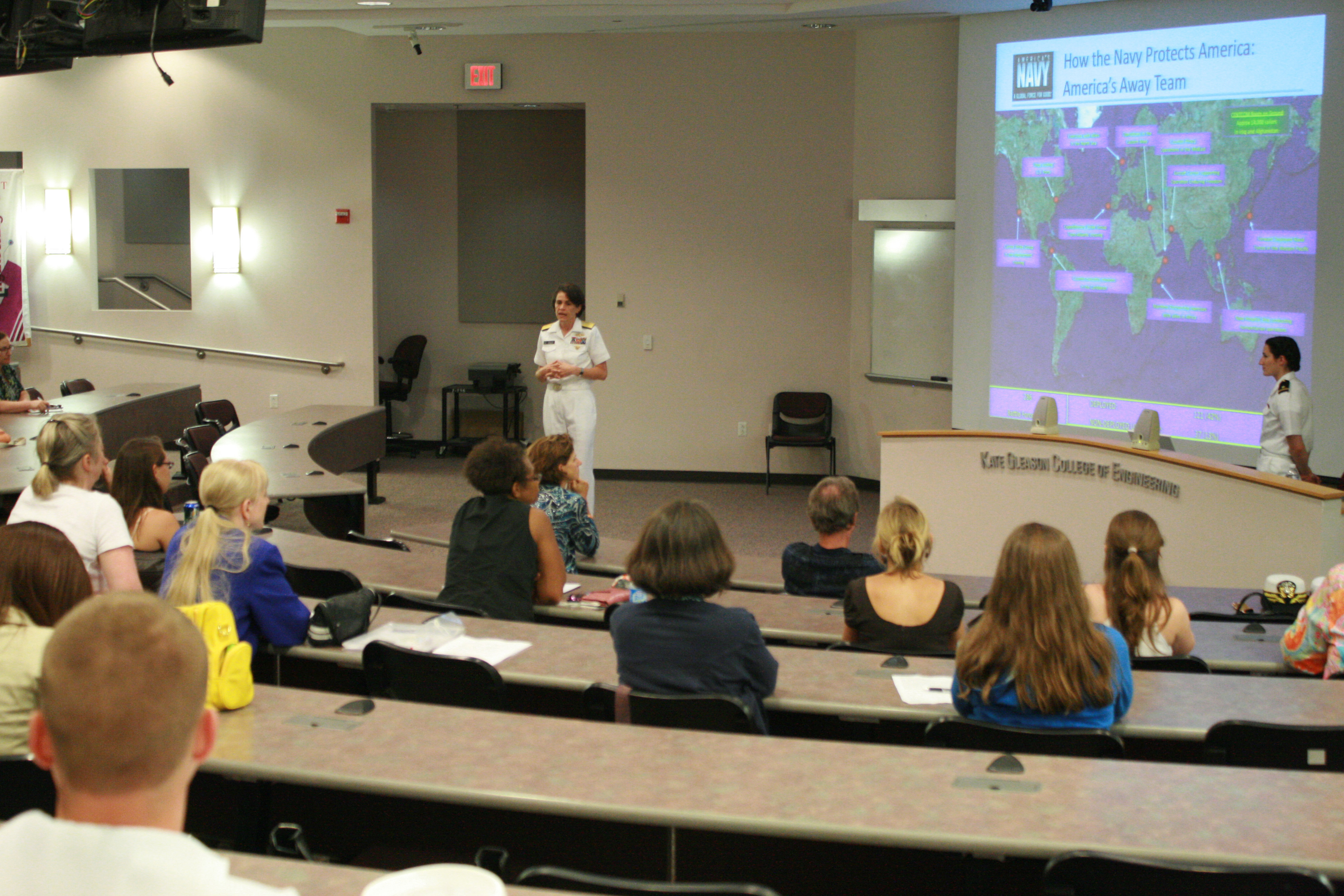
Rear Admiral Gretchen S. Herbert speaks with young women at an event sponsored by the Society of Women Engineers

=== Conferences ===
The Society of Women Engineers is organized at the local and Society levels. SWE hosts annual We Local regional events across the world. These events connect members in all stages of their careers and host similar events to the larger annual conference. SWE hosts one annual conference in a different location each year. As of 2024, the annual conference registration was over 20,000 attendees for the three-day conference, making it the largest event of its kind. This conference includes professional development workshops, inspirational speakers, and a career fair.

=== Outreach ===
Every year, SWE sections all over the world host events to help female students in primary and secondary school to understand and explore the possibilities of engineering as future careers. In the 2022 financial year, over 200 outreach events took place across the globe, impacting over 10,000 girls. SWE sponsors SWENext, a way for students aged 5-18 to join the SWE community. SWENext hosts many events including the Invent It. Build It. competition at the annual conference. In 2018, SWE launched a podcast series called SWE’s Diverse Podcasts, which focus on women in engineering and technology.

== Awards ==
=== SWE Achievement Award ===
In 1952, the Society of Women Engineers conferred its first and highest tribute, the Achievement Award, to Dr. Mária Telkes for her “meritorious contributions to the utilization of solar energy”. The Achievement Award has been presented annually since and recognizes a woman engineer for outstanding contributions over a significant period of time in any field of engineering.

- 1952 - Mária Telkes
- 1953 - Elsie Gregory MacGill
- 1954 - Edith Clarke
- 1955 - Margaret H. Hutchinson Rousseau
- 1956 - Elise Harmon
- 1957 - Rebecca Sparling
- 1958 - Mabel MacFerran Rockwell
- 1959 - Désirée Le Beau
- 1960 - Esther M. Conwell
- 1961 - Laurel van der Wal
- 1962 - Laurence Delisle Pellier
- 1963 - Beatrice Hicks
- 1964 - Grace Murray Hopper
- 1965 - Martha J. B. Thomas
- 1966 - Dorothy Martin Simon
- 1967 - Marguerite Rogers
- 1968 - Isabella Karle
- 1969 - Alice Stoll
- 1970 - Irmgard Flugge-Lotz
- 1971 - Alva T. Matthews
- 1972 - Nancy Fitzroy
- 1973 - Irene Peden
- 1974 - Barbara Crawford Johnson
- 1975 - Sheila Widnall
- 1976 - Ada Pressman
- 1977 - Mildred Dresselhaus
- 1978 - Giuliana Cavaglieri Tesoro
- 1979 - Jessie G. Cambra
- 1980 - Carolyn M. Preece
- 1981 - Thelma Estrin
- 1982 - Harriett B. Rigas
- 1983 - Joan Berkowitz
- 1984 - Geraldine Cox
- 1985 - Y.C.L. Susan Wu
- 1986 - Yvonne Brill
- 1987 - Nance K. Dicciani
- 1988 - Roberta Nichols
- 1989 - Doris Kuhlmann-Wilsdorf
- 1990 - Lynn Conway
- 1991 - Julia Weertman
- 1992 - Evangelia Micheli-Tzanakou
- 1993 - Elsa Reichmanis
- 1994 - Elsa Garmire
- 1995 - Manijeh Razeghi
- 1996 - Barbara Liskov
- 1997 - Ilene Busch-Vishniac
- 1998 - Lisa C. Klein
- 1999 - Shirley E. Schwartz
- 2000 - F. Suzanne Jenniches
- 2001 - Judith A. Clapp
- 2002 - Ümit Özkan
- 2003 - Mitra Dutta
- 2004 - Kristina M. Johnson
- 2005 - Bonnie J. Dunbar
- 2006 - Elaine S. Oran
- 2007 - Pamela Kay Strong
- 2008 - Melanie Cole
- 2009 - Aslaug Haraldsdottir
- 2010 - Chieko Asakawa
- 2011 - Cristina Amon
- 2012 - Yildiz Bayazitoglu
- 2013 - Eve Sprunt
- 2014 - Frances Hurwitz
- 2015 - Naira Hovakimyan
- 2016 - Stephanie Watts Butler
- 2017 - Frances H. Arnold
- 2018 - Jacqueline Chen
- 2019 - Not Awarded
- 2020 - Jayshree Seth
- 2021 - Qian Lin
- 2022 - Tina M. Nenoff
- 2023 - Thea Feyereisen
- 2024 - Lori Zipes
- 2025 - Priti Wanjara

=== SWE Annual Awards Program ===
SWE Awards celebrate high levels of achievement in engineering, engineering technology, engineering education, or science related to engineering. The APEX level awards recognize the achievements from those attained in late career. ASCENT recognizes collegiate and early to mid-career accomplishments. Recipients are recognized at the annual SWE conference. In 2021, SWE started organizing virtual awards ceremony called The WE Awards Hall. Awards are also offered for Collegiate Competitions and the K12 SWENext community.

=== SWE Recognition Program ===
SWE Recognitions acknowledge members, SWE groups, sections/affiliates, and organizations for their accomplishments, such as patents, and their support of the SWE mission, goals and objectives through excellence in programming. .

== Publications ==
In 1951, only a year after the society was first established, SWE began publishing the Journal of the Society of Women Engineers, which included both technical articles and society news. In 1954, the journal was superseded by the SWE Newsletter, a magazine format that focused primarily on SWE and industry news. In 1980, it was again renamed, this time to US Woman Engineer. In 1993, the title was changed yet again to SWE, which remains its current periodical title, with the subtitle "magazine of the Society of Women Engineers". The fifth volume of SWE was published in 2011 to celebrate the society’s 60th anniversary and to explore SWE's history in more depth using its archives. The current SWE Magazine is published five times per year.

== Past presidents ==
- 1950–1952, Beatrice Hicks
- 1952–1953, Lillian Murad
- 1953–1955, Katharine Stinson
- 1955–1956, Lois Graham
- 1956–1958, Miriam Gerla
- 1958–1961, Catherine Eiden
- 1961–1963, Patricia Brown
- 1963–1964, Aileen Cavanagh
- 1964–1966, Isabelle French
- 1966–1968, Alice Martin
- 1968–1970, Lydia Pickup
- 1970–1974, Olive Salembier
- 1972–1974, Naomi McAfee
- 1974–1976, Carolyn Phillips
- 1976–1978, Lt. Col. Arminta Harness
- 1978–1979, Paula Loring (now Simon)
- 1979–1980, Ada Pressman
- 1980–1981, Sharon Loeffler
- 1981–1982, Helen Grenga
- 1982–1983, Evelyn Murray-Lenthall
- 1983–1984, Barbara Wollmershauser
- 1984–1985, Sharon Lindquist-Skelley
- 1985–1986, Susan Whatley
- 1986–1987, Bette A. Krenzer
- 1987–1988, Kathleen Harer
- 1988–1989, Suzanne Jenniches
- 1989–1990, Glynis Hinschberger
- 1990–1991, Margaret Hickel
- 1991–1992, Jill Baylor now Jill Tietjen
- 1992–1993, Anna Salguero
- 1993–1994, Kathryn Cunningham
- 1994–1995, Jaclyn Spear
- 1995–1996, Ruthann Omer
- 1996–1997, Margaret Layne
- 1997–1998, Gloria Montano
- 1998–1999, Roberta Banaszak Gleiter
- 1999–2000, Sherita T. Ceasar
- 2000–2001, Gail G. Mattson
- 2001–2002, Shelley A. M. Wolff
- 2002–2003, Rachel A. B. McQuillen
- 2003–2004, Alma Martinez Fallon
- 2004–2005, Violettee V. Brown
- 2005–2006, Ronna F. Robertson
- 2006–2007, Jude A. Garzolini
- 2007–2008, Michelle Tortolani
- 2008–2009, Virginia Counts
- 2009–2010, Nora Lin
- 2010–2011, Siddika Demir
- 2011–2012, Melissa Tata
- 2012–2013, Alyse Stofer
- 2013–2014, Stacey DelVecchio
- 2014–2015, Elizabeth Bierman
- 2015–2016, Colleen Layman (now Scholl)
- 2016–2017, Jessica Rannow
- 2017–2018, Jonna Gerken
- 2018–2019, Cindy Hoover
- 2019-2020, Penny Wirsing
- 2020-2021, Heather Doty
- 2021-2022, Rachel Morford
- 2022-2023 Dayna Johnson
- 2023-2024 Alexis McKittrick
- 2023-2024 Karen Roth
- 2024-2025 Inaas Darrat

== Notable historical members ==
- Joy Lim Arthur
- Mary Blade
- Yvonne Clark
- Lois Cooper
- Hilda Counts
- Elsie Eaves
- Margaret R. Fox
- Lillian Moller Gilbreth (First Honorary Member)
- Isabel Hardwich
- Judith Arlene Resnik
- Harriett B. Rigas
- Ruth Schnapp
- Ruth Shafer
- Dorothy Martin Simon
- Cicely Thompson
- Maryly Van Leer Peck
- Olwen Wooster

== See also ==
- Engineering
- Glossary of engineering
- Engineering ethics
