= Bayazıtoğlu =

Bayazıtoğlu is a Turkish surname. Notable people with the name include:

- Yıldız Bayazıtoğlu (fl. 1967), Turkish-American engineer
- Almila Ada Bayazıtoğlu (born 1994), Turkish actress, model and ballerina
