= Gerla =

Gerla may refer to:

- Gerla, a minor planet
- Mario Gerla, Italian engineer
- Miriam Gerla, American engineer
