= Lisa Klein =

Lisa Klein may refer to:

- Lisa Klein (writer)
- Lisa Klein (cyclist)
- Lisa C. Klein, American engineer
