= Harriett B. Rigas =

Canadian electrical engineer (1934–1989)

- Born: 30 April 1934; Winnipeg, Manitoba, Canada
- Died: 26 July 1989 (aged 55); Michigan, U.S.
- Education: PhD
- Occupation: Professor of Engineering
- Employer(s): Washington State University, Michigan State University

Harriett B. Rigas (30 April 1934 – 26 July 1989) was a Canadian electrical engineer and innovative lecturer who was recognised worldwide for her hybrid computer and computer simulation research.

== Early life and education ==
Rigas was born on 30 April 1934 in Winnipeg, Manitoba. She graduated from Queens University in 1956 with a bachelor's degree. She completed her master's in electrical engineering in 1959, the same year she got married. Rigas completed her doctorate in 1963 also from Kansas University as the first woman to do so.

== Career ==
She worked in academia, as chair of the Washington State University Department of Electrical and Computing Engineering between 1966 and 1984 where she developed the computer engineering curriculum, she became a professor in 1976. During her time as a professor, she was chair of the Commission on the Status of Women, as she was an avid supporter and advocate of women seeking higher education.

Rigas was instrumental in creating the concept of automatic software patches. She then went on to become the chair of the Michigan State University Department of Electrical Engineering. Rigas also spent time on the National Academy of Sciences committee for scientific programs in Eastern Europe and the Soviet Union. Rigas was also professor at the Naval Postgraduate School in Monterey, California.

Rigas was named an Institute of Electrical and Electronics Engineers Fellow in 1984 for contributions to programming of analog/hybrid computers and to the development of computer engineering curricula. In 1988 Rigas was on the IEEE Board of Directors. She was the IEEE Division V Director.

Rigas was known for her advocacy of women in engineering. She was locally and nationally involved with the Society of Women Engineers, receiving the SWE Achievement Award in 1982.

She died in Michigan in 1989.

== Award & Scholarship ==
Washington state set up the Harriet B. Rigas Memorial Scholarship Fund which is awarded to Computer Engineering students. Michigan State has named the graduate program the Harriett B. Rigas Graduate Engineering Program. The IEEE has an award was founded in her name, the Harriett B. Rigas Award to recognize the outstanding engineering faculty women who have made a significant contribution to undergraduate education.
