= Alice Mary Stoll =

- fair use image only
- Born: August 25, 1917; Long Island
- Died: March 5, 2014 (aged 96)
- Other name: AM Stoll
- Engineering career
- Discipline: aerospace medicine, biophysics
- Institutions: Cornell University; Hunter College
- Employer(s): United States Navy Reserve; Naval Air Development Center; Cornell University Medical School; The New York Hospital
- Projects: Stoll Curve used in heat transfer and biotechnology. Stoll Curve used in acceleration and g-forces on the body
- Significant advance: effects of thermal tissue damage and pain sensation leading to the development of fire-resistant fibers and fabrics

Alice Mary Stoll (August 25, 1917 – March 5, 2014) was an American biophysicist and pioneer in aerospace medicine whose life work has saved thousands of lives through fire-resistant fabrics and the foundational research that led to the understanding of how burns occur as a function of time and temperature.

Stoll's seminal contributions occurred at the Naval Air Development Center. There, she developed two different Stoll Curves. One demonstrated human tolerance to centrifugal acceleration. The knowledge and application of this Stoll Curve would later enable designers of aircraft and space vehicles to determine when pilots needed to be protected against high-g-force conditions.

Her second Stoll Curve is foundational to the understanding of how to protect humans from flames. It led to the development by DuPont of Nomex®, a fabric used in everything from military uniforms to aircraft upholstery to hospital bed linens to ironing board covers.

Stoll received many awards during her lifetime, including the Society of Women Engineers Achievement Award (1969). She was inducted into the National Inventors Hall of Fame.

== Early life ==
Stoll was born in Long Island. She grew up on Staten Island, attending parochial schools there, and graduating from St. Peter High School. She completed her bachelor's degree in chemistry and physics at Hunter College in 1938.

== Career and further education ==
Jobs were hard to come by when she graduated from college, and she volunteered at The New York Hospital until she was hired into a permanent job there as a chemist in the Allergy Research Lab. She later moved into Infra-red Spectrophotometry at the Cornell University Medical School.

In 1943, she enlisted in the United States Naval Reserves, graduating from Officer Candidate School in 1944. She was released to inactive duty in 1946. During the years of World War II and until her release, Stoll performed research in parasitology. She remained in the U.S. Naval Reserves until her retirement with the rank of Commander in 1966.

Upon her release from the Navy, Stoll returned to Cornell University in New York. There, she earned a Masters in physiology and biophysics in 1948. Subsequent to earning her MS, she served as a research and teaching assistant and research associate. She was employed by the Department of Physiology, where she worked in environmental physiology, instrumentation, and research methods. While she was at Cornell, she and others filed paperwork for a patent that was awarded August 10, 1954. U.S. Patent Number 2,685,795 was for a pan-radiometer, an instrument for measuring environmental radiation. Her areas of research at Cornell included pain, thermal exchange with the environment, and burns. She stayed at Cornell until 1953.

In 1953 she joined the Naval Air Development Center (NADC), where she stayed until her retirement in 1980. Her positions included physiologist, special technical assistant to the research director, Head of Physiology Department, Head of Thermal Division, and Head of Biophysics and Bioastronautics for the crew systems department.

Although when she arrived at NADC she was a special technical assistant in the thermal laboratory, the laboratory was not completed. The head of the Department of Physiology told her that acceleration data were available from the human centrifuge located at the Aviation Medical Acceleration Laboratory (AMAL). From that data, Stoll developed the G-time tolerance curve ("Stoll curve") which is used to protect pilots from G-LOC. and published in 1956. She demonstrated that grayout, blackout and unconsciousness were affected by the rate of onset, and acceleration level of aviation pilots. These results are useful for humans who experience high-g forces such as during space travel and in air combat.

Once the laboratory was completed, her focus changed to thermal tissue damage and pain sensation. She showed the relationship between incident radiant energy density and exposure time. Stoll's thermal model was verified by blackening the volar surfaces of the forearms to thermal radiation and exposure to sources of heat, and recording levels of sensation and temperature rise, and further experiments on anesthetized rats and pigs. The near reciprocal relationship between maximum safe energy and exposure time, is referred to as a 'Stoll curve' – meaning that there are two sets of Stoll Curves, for two separate and unrelated scientific results.

She led the thermal laboratory between 1960 and 1964 during which time she conducted studies in thermal radiation and flame contact effects, developed fire-resistant materials, and devised methods of study. Stoll's guidelines on thermal safety resulted in the development of Nomex, a polymer based fiber with outstanding thermal properties. Nomex® was developed by DuPont in the 1960s and first came to market in 1967. Nomex® is the standard-issue fire-retardant clothing for all branches of the military. Hospitals use Nomex® for bed linens and sleepwear for paraplegics. It is used in protective clothing for race car drivers and firemen, and in many other everyday uses, from thermal underwear to ironing board covers to aircraft upholstery. It is used by industrial workers, especially those who could be exposed to hazards, including flash fires and electrical arcs. Her work also led to efforts on the part of textile manufacturers to develop better fire-resistant fibers and fabrics.

In 1964 she became the lead for the biophysical and bioastronautical division. Her work there included understanding the effects on crews of extremely cold temperatures at high altitudes, breaking the sound barrier, and the danger of fire in a close environment. She was made the lead of the biophysical laboratory at NADC in 1970 and worked there until she retired in 1980.

== Awards and honors ==
In 1969, Stoll received the Society of Women Engineers' Achievement Awards "In recognition of her significant contributions in the field of the development of fire-resistant fibers and fabrics, based on her pioneering studies of heat transfer from flame contact." In 1972, she received the Aerospace Medical Association's Paul Bert Award, which recognizes outstanding research contributions in aerospace physiology. Stoll was a Fellow of the American Association for the Advancement of Science and the Aerospace Medical Association.

Stoll received many awards from the NADC including incentive awards for publications of technical papers in acceleration research, flame contact studies, thermal protection capacity of aviator's textiles, a thermistor temperature-gradient measuring device, atmospheric oxygen enrichment effects on burning rates, skin temperature measurements, thermal protection principles, chapter on heat transfer in biotechnology, and invention disclosure and patent of instrument for heat transfer analysis. Stoll was named the Civil Servant of the Year in 1965 by the Federal Business Administration and the Federal Personnel Council of Philadelphia for significant achievements in thermal research. She also received a letter of commendation in the Navy Officer's Jacket for efforts within the Office of Naval Research. In 1980 she was named Honorary Member of the Wing.

Stoll was inducted into the National Inventors Hall of Fame in 2024 in recognition of her development of fire-resistant fibers and fabrics.

== Affiliations ==
Stoll was a member of the American Physiological Society, the American Society of Mechanical Engineers (ASME), the American Geophysical Union, and the Artic Institute of North America. She was active in the heat transfer and biotechnology sections of the ASME. Stoll served as Chairman of Technical Committee K-17 (Heat Transfer in Biotechnology) of the Heat Transfer Division for ASME from 1965–1958.

== Legacy ==
Alice Stoll has not one, but two curves name after her as "Stoll Curves". The first Stoll Curve relates to the force of acceleration and g-forces on the body and provided important fundamental data needed to safely put humankind in space and to protect fighter pilots. The second Stoll Curve relates heat exposure over time and predicts burn levels. It led to DuPont's fire-resistant fabric Nomex® today used by firefighters, race car drivers, industrial workers, hospital linens, infants' clothing, and more all around the world.

The Stoll Curve for heat flux is still applied today. It is used in computer programs for applications in arc flash and flash fire laboratories. The calculations help determine the ability of fabrics to serve as personal protective equipment for industrial workers.

Stoll was very proud to be the first woman to be subjected to extreme gravitational force, riding the AMAL human centrifuge to grayout at 7.5Gs. Her efforts led the way to many additional NADC women riding the centrifuge and the gathering of significant data on their experiences as well as those of the men.

In 1998, the Maria Chianta and Alice M. Stoll Professor of Physics Chair at was established at Hunter College.

== Additional reading ==
Tietjen, Jill (2025). "Chapter 23: Alice Mary Stoll". In Craig, Cecilia; Teig, Holly; Kimberling, Debra; Williams, Janet; Tietjen, Jill; Johnson, Vicki (eds.). Women Engineering Legends 1952–1976: Society of Women Engineers Achievement Award Recipients. Springer Cham. ISBN 9783032002235.
