= Nance Dicciani =

American chemical engineer

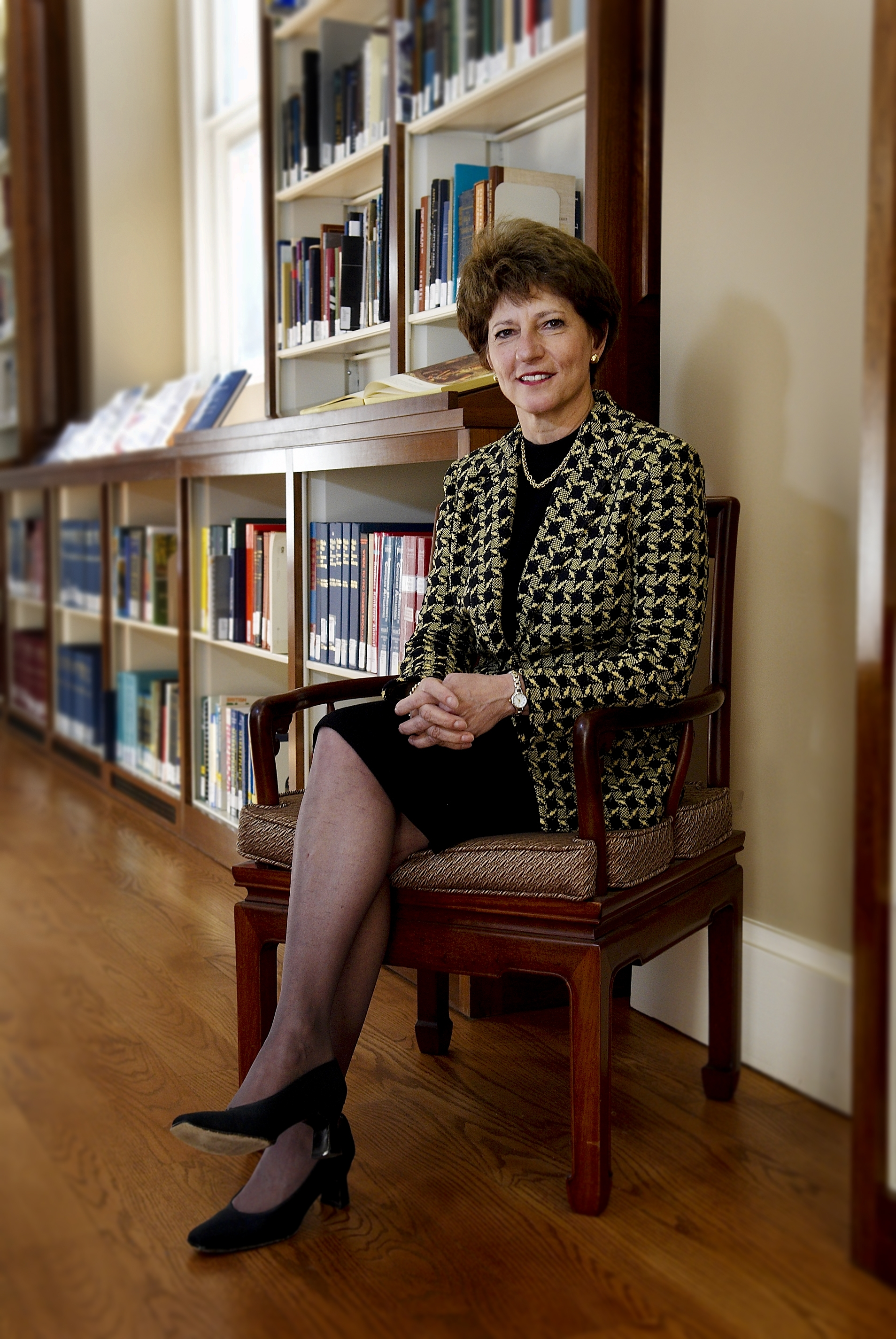
- Born: 1947 (age 78–79); Philadelphia, Pennsylvania, U.S.
- Education: Villanova University, University of Virginia, University of Pennsylvania, Wharton Business School
- Scientific career
- Fields: Chemical engineering
- Workplaces: Specialty Materials

Nance Dicciani (born 1947) is an American chemical engineer. She contributed significantly to the development of ultrasonic scanners for examining pregnant women with her doctoral dissertation, "Ultrasonically-Enhanced Diffusion of Macro Molecules in Gels." Her experience in chemistry and business have resulted in her achieving top positions in several companies, most recently Specialty Materials, a strategic business group of Honeywell. Forbes magazine has ranked her as one of The World's 100 Most Powerful Women.

== Background and education ==
Nance Dicciani was born in 1947 in Philadelphia, Pennsylvania. Her father was an industrial engineer, who supported her interest in the sciences. She studied chemical engineering, obtaining a bachelor's degree at Villanova University in 1969, a masters at the University of Virginia in 1970, and her doctoral degree from the University of Pennsylvania in 1977. In her doctoral dissertation, "Ultrasonically-Enhanced Diffusion of Macro Molecules in Gels," she applied chemical engineering to medical imaging, work that significantly contributed to the development of ultrasonic scanners for examining pregnant women. In 1987, she earned an M.B.A. from the Wharton Business School.

== Career ==
In 1977, Dicciani became an engineer with Air Products and Chemicals. She was promoted to various positions in research and development, achieving the position of director of commercial development in 1988. She was involved in developing the company's first non-cryogenic process for the separation of nitrogen and oxygen from air, and in identifying a new catalyst for producing benzene from coke.

In 1991, Dicciani was hired by Rohm and Haas as business director for its Petroleum Chemicals Division. By 1999, she had become senior vice president.

In November 2001, Dicciani became president and chief executive officer of Specialty Materials, a strategic business group of Honeywell. Specialty Materials, based in Morristown, New Jersey, provides specialty materials, including fluorine products; specialty films and additives; advanced fibers and composites; intermediates; specialty chemicals; electronic materials and chemicals; and technologies and materials for petroleum refining. Dicciani is credited with having cut costs, boosted sales and emphasized innovation at Specialty Materials. Nance Dicciani retired from Honeywell as of April 14, 2008.

== Honors and awards ==
In 2006, Dicciani was appointed by President George W. Bush to the President's Council of Advisors on Science and Technology (PCAST). She also currently serves on the executive committee of the American Chemistry Council and chairs the Board Research Committee. Dicciani is also a vice president of SCI, the Society of Chemical Industry and serves on their executive committee.

Dicciani serves on the boards of directors for Halliburton, Praxair, and Rockwood Holdings, Inc. She also serves on the board of trustees of Villanova University.

She has received a number of awards, including a 1987 Achievement Award from the Society of Women Engineers. She was the 2003 Warren K. Lewis Lecturer in Chemical Engineering at the Massachusetts Institute of Technology and has been ranked one of “The World's 100 Most Powerful Women” by Forbes magazine.

In 2025, Dicciani was elected to the National Academy of Engineering.
