= Naomi McAfee =

American engineer and President of the Society of Women Engineers

Naomi J. McAfee
- Born: October 27, 1934 (age 91); Hart County, Kentucky
- Education: Western Kentucky University
- Engineering career
- Discipline: Reliability Engineering
- Employer: Westinghouse Electric Corporation

Naomi J. McAfee is an American former reliability engineer who worked for the Westinghouse Electric Corporation, becoming the first woman to rise to the rank of supervisory engineer. She later became president of the Society of Women Engineers.

== Early life and education ==
McAfee was born in Hart County, Kentucky, in 1934 and grew up in Hardin County, where she graduated from Glendale High School in Glendale. McAfee graduated from Western Kentucky University in 1956 with a bachelor's degree in Physics, being the first woman to do so.

== Career ==
McAfee joined the Westinghouse Electric Corporation, Baltimore, in 1955 where she introduced reliability engineering to the company, ensuring it became embedded in their design processes. She was the third woman to be hired by Westinghouse, however the other two women left shortly after joining and it was another five years before other women were employed.

Over her 38-year career at Westinghouse, McAfee led a number of different initiatives. She was promoted to the level of supervisor, the first woman to hold this title at Westinghouse Defense and Electronic Systems Center in Baltimore. In this role she led the group that developed the camera system used on Skylab and Apollo 11. She also worked on the measurement of micrometeorite bombardment which informed the hull design of the Apollo spacecraft.

McAfee also played a role in bringing principles of reliability engineering to the US Army through her role on the Army Science Board.

In 1982, she was appointed to the President's Commission on the National Medal of Science.

== Memberships and legacy ==
As well as being a Fellow of the society, McAfee was the thirteenth president of the Society of Women Engineers from 1972 to 1974 after Olive Salembier. She was succeeded by Carolyn Phillips. During McAfee's presidency the Equal Rights Amendment was being debated in Congress. In the interest of gender equality SWE passed a motion to enable allowed male members to join the society. During this time she led research into women in engineering careers, publishing the results and later reflections.

McAfee's other honors include:

- SWE Fellow
- President of Reliability Society 1983–84
- US Army Commendation for Patriotic Civilian Service
- Edwards Medal by the American Society for Quality Control
- Reliability Society Engineer of the Year in 1995.
- Naomi Jones McAfee SKyTeach Scholarship Fund
