= Alva T. Matthews =

American engineer

Alva Matthews P.E.
- Born: Alva T. Matthews; August 29, 1933; Great Neck, New York, U.S.
- Died: August 24, 2022; New Canaan, Connecticut, U.S.
- Education: Columbia University B.S. Soil Mechanics, M.S. Structures (with honors), Eng.Sc.D. Engineering Mechanics and Applied Mathematics
- Occupation: Research engineer
- Known for: Shock analysis, elasticity, structural design
- Spouse: A.R. "Hap" Solomon (m. 1959)
- Children: 1
- Awards: Achievement Award Society of Women Engineers
- Engineering career
- Discipline: Engineering mechanics and applied mathematics
- Employer: Weidlinger Associates
- Significant advance: Development of material models for wave propagation in real materials including soil and rock

Alva T. Matthews (August 29, 1933 – August 24, 2022) was an American research engineer in the field of structural analysis and wave propagation in solids. Dr. Matthews made significant contributions to the field of engineering mechanics and applied mathematics in the areas of shock analysis, elasticity and structural design.

Dr. Matthews held a Doctorate in Engineering Science (Eng.Sc.D.) and a New York State Professional Engineering license. She was recognized in 1971 by the Society of Women Engineers with its highest honor, the Achievement Award.

== Early life and education ==
Matthews was an only child and grew up in Great Neck, New York. Her mother was a homemaker and her father was a civil engineer who owned an industrial construction firm.

After attending Middlebury College and Barnard College, Matthews completed her B.S in 1955. in Soil Mechanics at Columbia University. She gained practical experience through summer work: drafting at her father's construction firm one summer, working in the Columbia University Graphics Department another summer and writing planning reports for a contractor's field office another summer.

In 1955, Matthews became the first women engineering instructor in the Civil Engineering Department at Columbia University, where she taught Strengths of Materials and laboratory courses. She earned her M.S., with honor (Tau Beta Pi and Sigma Xi), in structures at Columbia University in 1957.

== Career ==
Many of Matthews' professors at Columbia were associated with the firm Paul Weidlinger Consulting Engineers, which was also known as Weidlinger Associates, located in New York City. Professor Hans H. Bleich, who would become her doctoral advisor, was a consultant for Weidlinger. Professor Mario Salvadori, who was quite helpful in her career, was a Partner in the firm. Through this connection, Matthews began work full-time at Weidlinger as a Design Engineer in the Applied Science division in 1957. Her boss at Weidlinger for several years was Professor Melvin L. Baron, who was the Director of Research there.

In 1958, she became a Research Engineer at Weidlinger and started work towards her doctoral thesis. Her research was on the mechanical behavior of materials which had been subjected to dynamic impact loads. In 1965, she completed her Doctor of Engineering Science degree, in Engineering Mechanics and Applied Mathematics, at Columbia. She was then promoted to Senior Research Engineer at Weidlinger.

Matthews spent the rest of her working career at Weidlinger. She carried on original research and development in a variety of fields. Her primary area of expertise was on waves, particularly shock waves. She designed models of the actions of soils subjected to a bomb blast, including the effects of a nuclear bomb blast to structures. This research was used in the design of underground silos and thin shell concrete structures as well as for the analysis of shock wave impacts on large gas storage tanks. Her research also simplified the iterative calculations of wave propagation in underwater acoustics, which was important for submarine hull design. Dr. Matthews’ research work advanced the fields of wave diffraction in elastic media and wave propagation in nonlinear and linear inelastic media. Because of her expertise in shock waves, the University of Rochester asked Matthews to serve on a committee for shock effects on head injuries.

Matthews participated in several technical reviews and reports for offices including the Aberdeen Proving Grounds, Office of Naval Research Lab, US Army Corps of Engineers, US Airforce Space Technology Lab, American Electronic Lab, and the Defense Atomic Support Agency. She co-authored several technical papers that appeared in leading peer-reviewed Journals such as the ASCE Journal of Engineering Mechanics, the ASME Journal of Applied Mechanics, and the International Journal of Solids and Structures. Her work is considered to be of fundamental importance in the study of wave propagation in Von Mises and Coulomb materials, and has had particular influence on the development of material models for wave propagation in real materials including soil and rock.

As a wave propagation specialist, Matthews also studied earthquakes to see how shock waves are transmitted through soil and rocks, and how buildings can be designed to withstand earth tremors. She has analyzed auto accidents to build safer cars and developed programming that was used in the development of the Telstar satellite tracking antenna and helicopter blade design.

Matthews was an adjunct lecturer at the University of Rochester starting in 1965 for the Mechanical and Aerospace Science department. She also taught undergraduate classes at Swarthmore College.

== Awards and organizations ==
Matthews was a member of the American Society of Civil Engineers, the American Society of Mechanical Engineers, and the New York State Society of Professional Engineers.

Matthews was a board member of the Society of Women Engineers (1967), serving as the National Procedures Chair in 1968, and the New York Section Chair in 1964. Matthews was the host chair of the first International Conference of Women Engineers and Scientists (ICWES) in New York City in 1964.

In 1971, Matthews received the Society of Women Engineers Achievement Award for her meritorious contributions to the field of engineering mechanics and applied mathematics in the area of shock analysis, elasticity and structural design.

== Personal life ==
Matthews married Abby Richard “Hap” Solomon in 1959. Solomon was an engineer who started working at the Xerox Corporation in 1961, located in Rochester, New York. They moved to New Canaan, CT in 1976 and had their only daughter, Stephanie Solomon, born in 1977. Stephanie earned a BA in psychology from Cornell University and MBA from Columbia University.

Matthews retired in 1982. She died in 2022 at the age of 88 in New Canaan, CT.
