= Dorothy Martin Simon =

American physical chemist

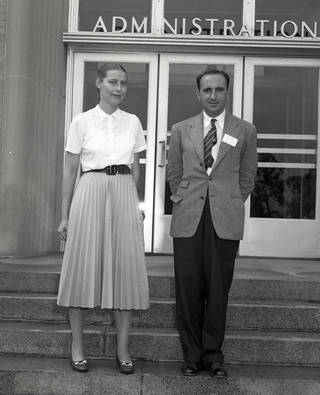
- Dorothy Simon (left) and Dr. N.P. Moore on a September 1954 visit to NACA
- Born: Dorothy Martin; September 18, 1919; Harwood, Missouri, U.S.
- Died: March 25, 2016 (aged 96); Pittsboro, N.C.
- Citizenship: United States of America
- Education: Southwest Missouri State University University of Chicago University of Illinois Cambridge University
- Occupations: An American physical chemist known for her work in space engineering, especially with aerospace combustion and the development of polymers.
- Known for: Important contributions to heat shield construction and the improvement of rocket engine design critical to the success of the Apollo space program. Her work with DuPont resulted in the creation of the synthetic polymers Dacron and Orlon.
- Spouse: Sidney L. Simon (m. 1947)
- Awards: Rockefeller Public Service Award (1953), Society of Women Engineers Achievement Award (1966)

Dorothy Martin Simon (September 18, 1919 – March 25, 2016) was an American physical chemist known for her work in space engineering, especially with aerospace combustion and the development of polymers. She made important contributions while at the National Advisory Committee for Aeronautics (NACA) regarding heat shield construction and improvement of rocket engine designs that were critical to the success of the Apollo space program. Her work with DuPont resulted in the creation of synthetic polymers Dacron and Orlon.

In 1966 she was awarded the Society of Women Engineers Achievement Award, the highest honor the society bestows in recognition of her significant contributions to engineering administration and space engineering, especially combustion and ablative coatings.

Dr. Simon said of herself, "I was born into science. I knew the word chemistry before I learned to talk."

== Early life and education ==
Dorothy Martin was born on September 18, 1919 in Harwood, Vernon County, Missouri to Laudell M (née Flynn) (1892–1978) and Robert W. Martin.

She graduated Greenwood Grade and High School as class Valedictorian. Strongly influenced by her father, a chemist and college professor, she earned her AB degree from Southwest Missouri State University where her father was head of the science department. She was the first graduate to achieve a perfect score (4.0 GPA).

In 1940, she attended the University of Chicago for one year, before transferring to University of Illinois. She earned the Strong Fellowship in 1944 and in 1945 completed her PhD in physical chemistry with thesis work regarding radon.

== Career highlights ==
1941 - 1945 - University of Illinois, Teaching Assistant.

1945 - 1946 - DuPont de Nemours & Company, Rayon Division, Pioneer Research Lab, Buffalo, New York. Associate Chemist.

After earning her PhD, Simon worked to develop new catalysts to change the properties of synthetic polymers. This work led to the development of two polymers which would later be named Dacron and Orlon.

1946 - 1949 Atomic Energy Commission, Argonne National Laboratory, Chicago, Illinois, and Oak Ridge National Laboratory (ORNL), in Oak Ridge, Tennessee. Associate Chemist.

After completing her work with DuPont, Simon transferred to ORNL. There, she made discoveries in the field of radiochemistry while studying the triple-fission of uranium. Simon also became the first to discover a new isotope of calcium. For a short period of time after leaving ORNL, she continued with similar research regarding uranium at Argonne National Laboratory in Chicago, Illinois.

1949 - 1955 National Space and Aeronautics Administration (then National Advisory Committee for Aeronautics (NACA)) Lewis Research Center Fuels and Combustion Division. Assistant Branch Chief, Chemistry Branch.

Simon began work at Lewis Research Center, a division of the National Advisory Committee for Aeronautics (NACA), the predecessor of NASA. She conducted research regarding flame velocities and types of fuel for aerospace applications including studies to determine the minimum diameter of tubing necessary to maintain an engine flame. This led to Simon being credited in numerous technical publications and research papers, and led to improvements in engine designs for aeronautic and spaceflight purposes.

As a result of her work at NACA, Simon was given the Rockefeller Federal Service Award, which entailed a $10,000 (~$110,000 in 2022) grant from the Rockefeller Foundation. She used this award to travel to Europe to further her education at the University of Cambridge in Cambridge, England. Simon toured around Europe where she met with scientists from Germany, England, France, and Italy to examine their research regarding physical chemistry and radiochemistry. Upon returning from her tour, she was promoted to assistant chief of NACA’s combustion branch, where she became a pioneer in female corporate management.

1955 - 1956 Magnolia Petroleum Company, Dallas, Texas. Group Leader, Fundamental Combustion Branch.

Once leaving NACA, Simon briefly held a position at Magnolia Petroleum in Texas, where she did work regarding oil sands. Her efforts aimed to develop a profitable method of removing the oil, separating it from the sand underground.

1956 - 1985 Avco, Greenwich Connecticut. Vice President and Director of Corporate Research for the Defense and Industrial Products Group.

Simon took a position at Avco Corporation, an aviation conglomerate in New England. There, she applied her previous experience with polymer construction and physical chemistry to develop the technology for early aerospace heat shields, which were critical to NASA’s crewed spacecraft endeavors. This technology would go on to be used most notably during NASA’s Apollo program, and later was applied to ballistic missiles at the height of the Cold War.

Her success led to her appointment as Director of Corporate Research in 1962, where she directed advanced research in six AVCO divisions: Aerospace Structures (Nashville, Tennessee); Lycoming (Stratford, Conn.) Electronics (Cincinnati, Ohio); Ordance (Richmond, Indiana); AVCO-Tulsa; and Research and Advanced Development (Wilmington, Mass.)

In 1964 she was promoted to Vice-President of these six groups, becoming the company's first female corporate officer.

In 1965 she was appointed Director of Economic Systems Corporation, an Avco subsidiary that operated the largest girls' Job Corps Training Center at Poland Springs, Maine.

1n 1983, Dr. Dorothy Simon testified before the Senate Subcommittee on Science, Technology, and Space, stating that fire-related costs of building construction in the United States could be reduced by 40 percent through the use of modern fire technology.

1985 - 1993 Consultant

She operated her consulting firm, Simon Associated, from her home in Chapel Hill, North Carolina.

== Affiliations ==
- Honorary Mathematics and Foreign Language Society
- Sigma Xi
- Iota Sigma Pi
- American Association for the Advancement of Science
- American Chemical Society
- American Institute of Aeronautics and Astronautics
- American Ordnance Association
- International Combustion Institute
- Society of Women Engineers

== Awards and honors ==
- Rockefeller Public Service Award awarded by the Trustees of Princeton University (1953)
- Invited Lecturer, Advisory Group for Aeronautical Research and Development (AGARD) or NATO, Cambridge, England. 1953
- Named an "Outstanding Alumnus" by the SMSU Alumni Association (1957)
- Marie Curie Lecturer, Pennsylvania State University 1962
- Society of Women Engineers Achievement Award (1966)
- Honorary Doctor of Science degree from Worcester Polytechnic Institute (1971)
- Businessweek’s list of 100 Top Corporate Women (1976)
- Honorary Doctor of Engineering degree from Lehigh University (1978).
- Alumni Achievement Award from the University of Illinois (1983)
- Listed in American Men of Science, Who’s Who in the East, and Who’s Who of American Women.

== Legacy ==
After concluding her research career, Simon served on numerous committees and advisory boards for government agencies, universities, and corporations. The most notable positions include the Department of Commerce Committee for the National Bureau of Standards, and the committee for the National Medal of Science during the Carter administration. Simon served as the first female trustee at Worcester Polytechnic Institute, where she set up the Dorothy M. Simon Endowed Fund for Fire Safety Studies.

Throughout the 1950’s she served as an advocate for women in science and education, appearing in several radio shows and magazines.

- The Saturday Evening Post, November 14, 1959 “Dr. Dorothy Martin Simon Knows Rockets”
- Missouri State University Magazine, undated, “The Lady is a Scientist”.
- Junior Engineering Technical Society - Jets Journal Nov 1963.

Simon had several firsts during her career:

- Critical developments in synthetic polymers led to Dacron and Orlon.
- She was the appointed a trustee at Worcester Polytechnic Institute (WPI).
- Dr. Simon was the first to discover a new isotope of calcium.
- In addition to scientific and engineering firsts, Dr. Simon garnered recognition throughout her career for her management style.

== Selected Published Works ==
- “An evaluation of the soap-bubble method for burning velocity measurements using ethylene-oxygen nitrogen and methane-oxygen-nitrogen mixtures.” NACA-TN-3106. co-authored with Wong, Edgar L. February 1954 http://hdl.handle.net/2060/19930083831
- “Prediction of flame velocities of hydrocarbon flames.” NACA-TR-1158 co-authored with Dugger, Gordon L. 1954 http://hdl.handle.net/2060/19930092187
- “Prediction of flame velocities of hydrocarbon flames.” NACA-RM-E52J13 co-authored with Dugger, Gordon L. 1953 http://hdl.handle.net/2060/19930087439
- “Flame velocities over a wide composition range for pentane-air, ethylene-air, and propyne-air." NACA-RM-E51H09 co-authored with Wong, Edgar, L. 1951 http://hdl.handle.net/2060/19930086813
- “Variation of the pressure limits of flame propagation with tube diameter for propane-air mixtures.” NACA-RM-E51J09 co-authored with Belles, Frank. E. 1951 http://hdl.handle.net/2060/19930087025
- “An active particle diffusion theory of flame quenching for laminar flames.” NACA-RM-E51L18 co-authored with Belles, Frank E. 1952 http://hdl.handle.net/2060/19930086923
- “Effects of additives on pressure limits of flame propagation of propane-air mixtures.” NACA-RM-E53I29 co-authored with Belles, Frank E. 1953 http://hdl.handle.net/2060/19930088034

== Personal life ==
Dorothy Martin (Simon) married Dr. Sidney L. Simon, (1913 - 1975) a fellow graduate student from the University of Chicago, in 1946 and took his surname.

Simon died on March 25, 2016, at the age of 96, in her home in Pittsboro, North Carolina.

== Additional Reading ==
Reed, Linda (2025). Chapter 19 "Dorothy Martin Simon". In Craig, Cecilia; Teig, Holly; Kimberling, Debra; Williams, Janet; Tietjen, Jill; Johnson, Vicki (eds.). Women Engineering Legends 1952-1976: Society of Women Engineers Achievement Award Recipients. Springer Cham. ISBN 9783032002235
