= Patricia Brown (engineer) =

American chemical engineer (born 1928)

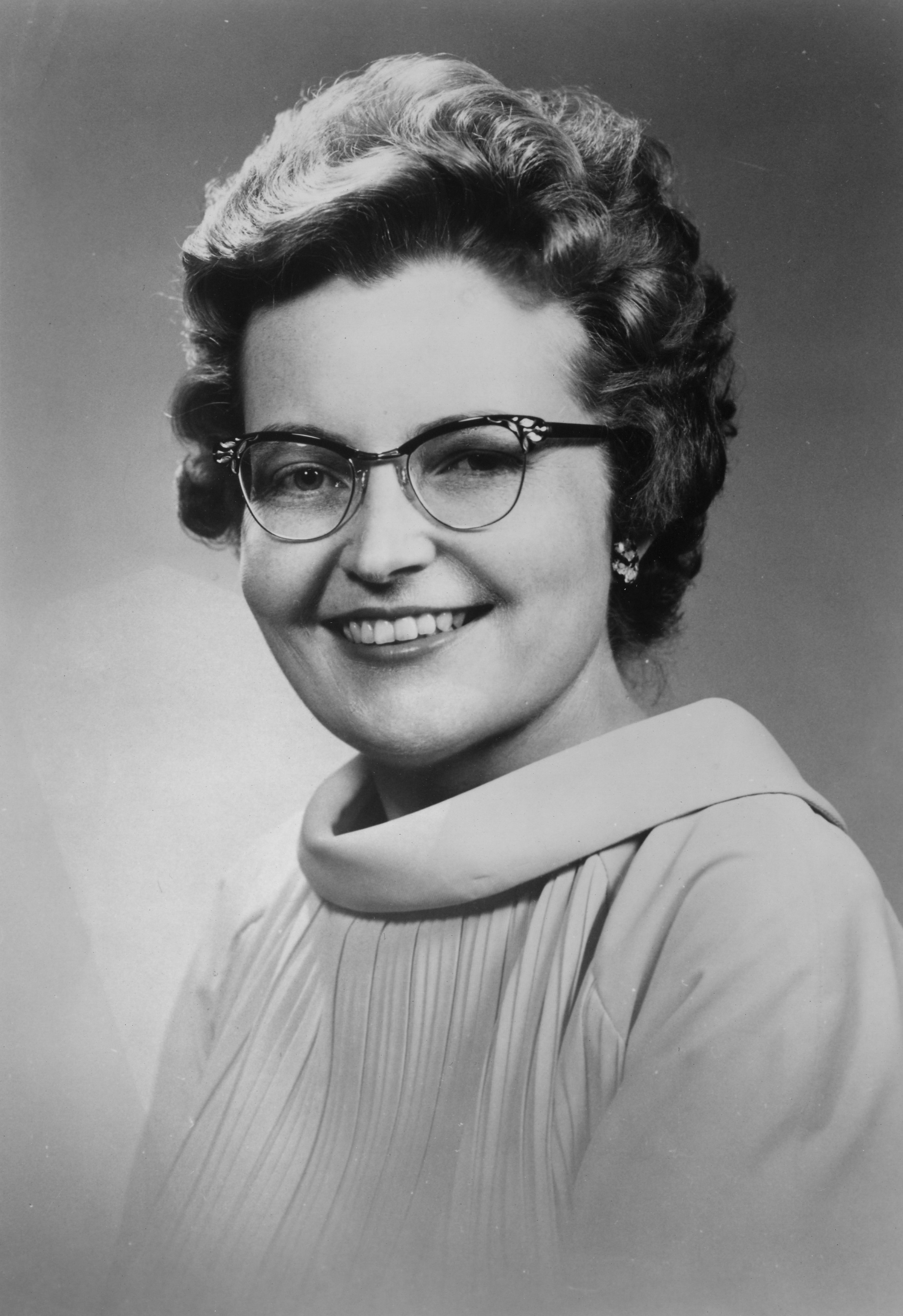
- President of SWE from 1961-63
- Born: October 1, 1928 (age 97); Lafayette, Louisiana, U.S.
- Education: Southwestern Louisiana Institute
- Occupations: Chemical engineer, Technical writer

Patricia L. Brown (born October 1, 1928) was the first female chemical engineer to graduate from Southwestern Louisiana Institute. She was one out of a total of two female chemical engineers at Stepan Company in 1993.

== Education ==
Patricia Brown graduated from Southwestern Louisiana Institute as the first female chemical engineer in 1947. Then she earned her master's degree in chemistry from the University of Texas in 1949.

== Career ==
Brown taught chemistry at Smith College. She became a research associate at Albany Medical College. Then she worked for Ethyl Corporation in Detroit. Here, she began her career as a technical information resources specialist.

In 1955, Brown became a technical writer at Bettis Atomic Power Division Westinghouse. Then she became an Information Services Supervisor at Texas Instruments in 1957. She left Texas Instruments to do research in information storage and retrieval at Battelle Memorial Institute. After that, she worked in technical information management at Baxter Laboratories in Illinois. Brown remained in the field of information and research for the rest of her career until her retirement from Stepan Company. She learned skills in data analysis, system design, reporting and publishing, computer operations and management.

In addition to SWE, Brown is affiliated with the American Society for Information Science, the American Chemical Society, and the Society for Technical Communication.

"Today, most of the women who are graduating in engineering recognize that their engineering background may put them in a totally different area than actual hands-on engineering."
– Patricia Brown

== Society of Women Engineers ==
Brown was a lifelong active member of the Society of Women Engineers (SWE) and served as the society's seventh president from 1961 to 1963. She co-founded the Detroit section of SWE in 1952. She was one of the first members, a Charter Member, of the South Ohio SWE section. When she arrived in Dallas, there was no regional section of SWE, so she kept in touch at the national level.

You can’t be everything to everybody, but the fact that some women didn’t need us didn’t mean that there weren’t an awful lot more women who did.
– Patricia Brown

She was a key Member in helping keep SWE afloat in the late 1950s, when money was scarce and membership was low.

While Brown was president of SWE, she worked with Lillian Moller Gilbreth to help advance SWE's goals to encourage women engineers to succeed. As president, because of a minor miscommunication, Brown presented an honorary award to Marlene Schmidt, a German engineer who was also Miss Universe at the time. She attempted to persuade Grace Hopper to help SWE's cause as well, but Hopper did not believe in a separate society for women.

== See also ==
- Society of Women Engineers
- American Society for Information Science
- American Chemical Society
- Society for Technical Communication
