= Mitra Dutta =

Indian-American electronics engineer

- Born: 1953 (age 72–73)
- Occupation: Engineer
- Title: Distinguished Professor Emeritus at the University of Chicago Head of Department of Electrical and Computer Engineering at the University of Chicago (former)

Academic background
- Education: Undergrad of Gauhati University, Physics Graduate at the University of Delhi and The University of Cincinnati

Mitra Dutta (born 1953) is an Indian-American physicist and electronics engineer known for her research on optoelectronics. She is a distinguished professor of electrical and computer engineering at the University of Illinois at Chicago, and the university's former vice chancellor for research.

== Education and career ==
Dutta is a graduate of Gauhati University, and has a master's degree in physics from the University of Delhi. She earned a second master's degree and PhD in physics at the University of Cincinnati.

She was a postdoctoral researcher at Purdue University, the City College of New York, and Brookhaven National Laboratory before becoming a team leader and eventually division director of physics at the United States Army Research Laboratory. She moved to the Army Research Office in 1996, as head of the electronics division and later director of research technology and integration.

Dutta moved to the University of Illinois at Chicago in 2001, and was named a Distinguished Professor in 2004. She headed the Department of Electrical and Computer Engineering for over ten years, from her 2001 appointment until being named vice chancellor for research in 2012. She stepped down as vice chancellor in 2018, and was succeeded by geneticist Joanna Groden.

== Books ==
Dutta is the coauthor of Phonons in Nanostructures (with Michael A. Stroscio, Cambridge University Press, 2001), and of Introduction to Optical and Optoelectronic Properties of Nanostructures (with Stroscio, V. V. Mitin, and V. A. Kochelap, Cambridge University Press, 2019), and the editor of multiple edited volumes.

== Recognition ==
Dutta became a Fellow of the Optical Society in 1998. She was named a Fellow of the IEEE in 1999, "for contributions to heterostructure-based optoelectronic and electronic devices", and in 2000 the IEEE gave her the Harry Diamond Memorial Award for "innovative design, characterization and realization of high performance heterostructure optoelectronic devices, and establishment of major research programs in this field". The Society of Women Engineers gave her their Achievement Award in 2003.

She became a Fellow of the American Physical Society (APS) in 2012, after a nomination by the APS Forum on Physics and Society, "for research leadership and administration in government and academia, through which she has supported the applications of physics for society, outreach to the public, and enhancement of physics education". She is also a Fellow of the American Association for the Advancement of Science.
