= Laurence Delisle Pellier =

French metallurgical engineer (1904–2004)

- Born: Laurence Delisle; 1904; Paris, France
- Died: 2004 (aged 99–100); Westport, Connecticut
- Education: City College of New York, (1939 BS, chemical engineering); Stevens Institute of Technology, (1942 MS, metallurgy)
- Occupation: metallurgical engineer
- Known for: Metallurgical techniques using an electron microscope
- Spouse: Christian (Rene) Pellier
- Engineering career
- Employers: International Nickel Company, American Cyanamid Company, Burndy Corporation, Sylvania Electric Products
- Projects: electro plate techniques, corrosion and wear resistance in alloys, developing electron microscope techniques
- Significant design: powder metallurgy, alloy design, gold-plated surgical needle patent
- Awards: Society of Women Engineers Achievement Award

Laurence Delisle Pellier (1904–2004) was a metallurgical engineer who developed techniques for applying electron microscopy to metallurgical problems, researched alloy manufacturing methods for fine instruments and wires, and established a breadth of metallurgical testing procedures throughout her career.

Pellier was a specialist in physical metallurgy, particularly light and electron microscopy. She was a prolific author of technical papers and a US patent holder for the gold plating of surgical needles. Her participation as a member of the American Society of Testing Materials (ASTM) subcommittee on electron microstructure of metals generated micrographs of alloys and a multitude of publications about their metallurgical structures.

In 1962, the Society of Women Engineers (SWE) awarded Pellier their highest award, the Achievement Award.

== Early life and education ==
Born in Paris, France in 1904, Laurence Pellier came to the United States in the 1920’s.

Pellier earned a Bachelor of Science in Chemical Engineering (cum laude) from the College of the City of New York (CCNY) in 1939. She went on to obtain a Masters of Science degree in Metallurgy from the Stevens Institute of Technology of New Jersey in 1942.

While at Stevens Institute, she had her first experiences in metallurgical investigations as a research associate and research fellow for the International Nickel Company. For six years, she was engaged in the study and design of alloys by powder metallurgy. Pellier continued working toward a Ph.D. in physical metallurgy at Columbia University during her early career.

== Career ==
In 1946, Pellier became a senior metallurgical engineer at Sylvania Electric Products in Bayside NY. She was responsible for the development of techniques for the application of electron microscopy to problems in physical metallurgy, with emphasis on deformation, recovery and recrystallization in tungsten and copper.

In 1951, Pellier accepted a role as a metallurgist with the American Cyanamid Company in Connecticut. She was engaged in specifications of metals used in the construction of chemical plants, particularly stainless steels and titanium alloys. She concentrated on electron metallography, employing light and electron microscopes in her research and also worked with electro and ‘electroless’ plating techniques.

Pellier’s work with American Cyanamid Company led to the invention of gold plating of surgical needles, awarded United States patent number 2,865,376 in December 1958.

In 1956, Pellier joined Sigmund Cohn Corporation of Mount Vernon, NY as a research metallurgist. She applied her expertise to the design and processing of precious metal alloys of high corrosion and wear resistance, with a wide range of electrical properties. The new alloys were used in fine instrumentation products, such as potentiometers, resistance thermometers, and thermocouples.

In 1957, Pellier switched to Philips Electronics, Inc. as an application engineer for Electron optics where she worked with prospective customers to perform services in electron microscopy and diffraction. Later she returned to International Nickel Company in New Jersey as a senior scientist. She performed electron metallography analyses of high temperature alloys, high strength steels, stainless steels, nickel powders. Pellier used different techniques to understand the microstructures, such as included replicas, extraction replicas, direction examination of thinned sections, and electron diffraction.

In 1960, Pellier took a sabbatical attending technical meetings at Cambridge, England; Delft, Holland and Paris, France and followed research work in metallurgy being conducted by the Division of European Research Associates in Brussels, Belgium on refractory metals, such as tantalum. In 1961, she returned to a metallurgist role at the Burndy Corporation in Norwalk, Connecticut.

In retirement, Pellier set up a small business at her home in Westport, Connecticut called the Pellier - Delisle Metallurgical Laboratory. Services that were offered: optical and electron metallography, physical metallurgy, powder metallurgy, consulting, and mechanical engineering. Pellier continued to work and report results to several clients until her vision declined as she neared age 90.

== Patents ==
- “Gold plating of surgical needle” United States Patent No. 2,865,376, December 23, 1958, American Cyanamid Company

== Awards and professional affiliations ==
In 1962, Pellier received the Achievement Award of the Society of Women Engineers in recognition of her significant contributions to the field of metallurgy, exemplified by her continuous leadership in research and development of products, physical metallurgy testing and manufacturing methods.

Pellier was a member of the American Institute of Mining and Metallurgical Engineers, American Society for Metals, American Society for Testing Materials, Electron Microscope Society of America, French Engineers in the U.S.A., New York Electron Microscopists, New York Microscopical Society, Société Française de Métallurgie, and the Society of Women Engineers.

== Legacy ==
Pellier was a charter members of the Society of Women Engineers in 1950. Pellier was presented with an honorary life membership in SWE with her 1962 SWE Achievement award.

On engineering, Pellier stated, “The role of women in engineering is the same as that of men. The timeworn prejudices and hearsays leveled at women have long been proved false as more of them have entered the profession. Women are subjected to the same exacting training as men; they take the same examinations; receive the same degrees and - on the job - fulfill the same assignments.”

In 2023, Pellier was one of six featured pioneers for Women’s History month at the National Inventors Hall of Fame Museum (NIHF) housed in the US Patent and Trademark Office.

== Personal life ==
Pellier (Laurence Delisle) married Christian (Rene) Pellier prior to coming to the United States in the 1920's. She followed her husband, a mechanical engineering consultant, in 1960 to Europe when he was sent to oversee the installation of machinery at a plant in Belgium.

Pellier died in her Connecticut home in 2004, at the age of 100.

== Bibliography ==
Selected technical publications:

- Bonding Metal Particles by Heat Alone without Pressure, Laurence Delisle, Trans. Electrochemical Society, Vol. 85, 1944
- Nickel-Iron Alloys Produced by Powder Metallurgy, Laurence Delisle and Aaron Finger, A.I.M.E. Tech. Pub. 2046, 1946
- A Method of Examination of Sections of Fine Metal Powder Particles with the Electron Microscope, Laurence Delisle, Metal Trans. March 1949. Also “Mikroskopie”, Vienna, Vol. 4, 1949
- Examination of Sub-grain Structures with the Electron Microscope, Laurence Delisle and Gordon A. Davis, article in “Physics of Powder Metallurgy”, McGraw-Hill Book Company, 1952
- Electron Microscope Study of the Effect of Cold Work on the Sub-grain Structure of Copper, Laurence Delisle, Journal of Metals, May 1953
- Observations a l’Aide due Microscope Electronique de l’Effet de la Restauration sur las Sous-Structure du Cuivre, Laurence Delisle, Revue de Metallurgie, Paris, France Oct 1953
- Electron Micrographs of Tungsten, Metal Progress, November 1949
- Electron Micrographs of Copper, A.S.T.M. Bulletin, December 1952
- Electron Micrographs of Annealing Twins and Grain boundaries in Copper, A.S.M. Exhibit
- Electron Micrographs of Sections of Particles of Nickel Powder, A.S.T.M. Photographic Exhibit 1954
- Participation in work and publications of the ASTM subcommittee on electron microstructure of metals (1950-1957)
  - Electron Microstructure of Steel, Proceedings ASTM Vol. 50 (1950)
  - Electron Microstructure of Bainite in Steel, Proceedings ASTM Vol. 52 (1952)
  - Techniques for Ferrous Electron Metallography, Proceedings ASTM Vol. 53 (1953)
  - Electron Microstructure of Tempered Bainite and Tempered Martensite,Proceedings ASTM Vol. 54 (1954)
  - Electron Microstructure of Bainite, Pearlite and Tempered Martensite in Steel, Proceedings ASTM Vol. 55 (1955)
  - Electron Microstructure of Bainite, Pearlite and Tempered Martensite in AISI 4140 Steel, Proceedings ASTM Vol. 57 (1957)
