= Désirée Le Beau =

Austro-Hungarian-American industrial chemist and inventor

- Born: Sidonie Désirée Le Beau; February 12, 1907; Teschen, Austria-Hungary
- Died: January 20, 1993; Cherokee Village, Arkansas
- Education: University of Vienna; University of Graz
- Known for: Rubber reclamation methods
- Spouse: Henry W. Meyer
- Scientific career
- Fields: colloid chemistry
- Workplaces: MIT
- Engineering career
- Employers: Dewey and Alma Chemical Company, Midwest Rubber Reclaiming Company
- Significant design: Processing improvements for recycled synthetic rubber (patents)
- Significant advance: Reuse of natural and synthetic rubber.
- Awards: Society of Women Engineers' Achievement Award

Sidonie Désirée Le Beau (14 February 1907 - 20 January 1993) was an Austro-Hungarian-American colloid chemist and inventor with extensive experience and expertise in the reprocessing and reuse of synthetic and natural rubber. As Director of Research for the Midwest Rubber Reclaiming Company, she was the first woman to hold such a position in the rubber industry. She was responsible for developing materials from scrap rubber, mostly old tires, for reuse in new products. Her work generated 5 patents in her name that covered chemical processes for rubber material reuse and in one case, a pad for railroad ties made from reused rubber materials. She earned honors from the American Chemical Society for her service to the organization.

== Early life and education ==
Le Beau was born in Teschen, Austria-Hungary, now in modern-day Poland. Her Polish mother gave birth while her father, a soldier in the Austrian Army, was serving in Dalmatia. She received her early education alternately in Austria and Sweden, as her family moved between these locations while she was growing up. She developed interests in chemistry and music but decided that chemistry would be a better career choice. Ultimately, she decided to study pharmacy at the University of Vienna. She accidentally enrolled in a lab course for chemistry majors and enjoyed it so much she switched her major to chemistry. Le Beau studied at the University of Vienna for her undergraduate degree, and earned her Ph.D. in chemistry with minors in physics and mathematics from the University of Graz in 1931. Her upbringing and education in Europe resulted in fluency in French, Swedish, German, and Latin.

== Career and research ==
After earning her Ph.D., Le Beau started her career as a researcher at the Austro-American Rubber Works in Vienna. She was also a consultant for the Société de Progrès Technique in Paris. In 1936, she moved to the Dewey and Alma Chemical Company in Massachusetts, where she stayed until her 1940 move to MIT as a research associate. Le Beau stayed at MIT until 1945, then moved to the St. Louis, MO area to become Director of Research the Midwest Rubber Reclaiming Company in East St. Louis, Illinois. At the time, Midwest Rubber Reclaiming was the largest rubber reclaiming company in the world. As director of research, Le Beau developed materials from scrap rubber, mostly old tires, to use in new products and applications. She was awarded 5 U.S. patents from 1947 to 1965 involving improvements in processing for recycled synthetic rubber, all of which were patented in multiple countries. In 1958, she developed a rubber tie pad for American railroads that was patented in 1963.

Le Beau became increasingly recognized as an expert in colloid chemistry, particularly as it pertained to the reuse of natural and synthetic rubber. She published many technical articles in the late 1940s through the 1950s. She authored a chapter on reclaiming of elastomers for a textbook on colloid chemistry and co-authored the chapter on the chemistry of clay minerals and films. And she was often an invited technical speaker in St. Louis and beyond.

== Awards, honors and affiliations ==
Le Beau earned 5 U.S. patents involving improvements in processing for recycled synthetic rubber, many of which were also granted in other countries. Le Beau became the first female Director of Research in the rubber industry when she started working for Midwest Rubber Reclaiming Company in 1945.

Le Beau authored or co-authored dozens of papers in colloid chemistry and its application to the rubber industry. She was selected as the 1950 Curie Lecturer at Penn State College (now Penn State University), speaking on “Elastic Polymers: Science and Economics of Rubber.”.

In 1948, Le Beau was elected the chairman of the American Chemical Society (ACS), Colloid Chemistry division. In this capacity she organized scientific meetings, published research, and participated in the leadership of ACS. She served as chair again in 1953. She was also active in the St. Louis Section of ACS, serving as Chairman in 1952.

She was made a Fellow of the American Institute of Chemists. She also belonged to the New York Academy of Science, The American Institute of Chemists, The British Institute of the Rubber Industry, and the American Association for the Advancement of Science.

In 1959, Le Beau received the Society of Women Engineers Achievement Award in recognition of her significant contributions to the field of rubber reclamation.

In 1959, Le Beau was honored as one of ten Women of Achievement by the City of St. Louis, Missouri.

== Personal life ==
By 1935, Hitler’s intentions for Europe became clear, prompting Le Beau to United States in 1936. She applied for U.S. citizenship while working in Massachusetts and received approval in 1938.

Le Beau married metallurgical engineer Henry W. Meyer in 1955. The couple retired and moved to Cherokee Village, Arkansas in 1969. Meyer died in 1991 and Le Beau in 1993.

== Additional reading ==
- Williams, Janet (2025). Chapter 11 "Désirée Le Beau". In Craig, Cecilia; Teig, Holly; Kimberling, Debra; Williams, Janet; Tietjen, Jill; Johnson, Vicki (eds.). Women Engineering Legends 1952-1976: Society of Women Engineers Achievement Award Recipients. Springer Cham. ISBN 9783032002235
