= Sherita Ceasar =

Sherita T. Ceasar
- Education: B.S. Mechanical Engineering, Illinois Institute of Technology (1977-1981), M.S. Mechanical Engineering, Illinois Institute of Technology (1981-1984)
- Employer: Comcast Cable

Sherita T. Ceasar is the Senior Vice President of Technology Environment and Strategy for Comcast Communications and has worked in the telecommunications industry since 1988. She was the first African American president of the Society of Women Engineers, a position she held from 1999 to 2000.

== Education ==
Sherita Ceasar grew up on the south side of Chicago, attending a technical college preparatory school. She earned a Bachelor of Science in 1981 followed by a Masters of Science in 1984, both in Mechanical Engineering from the Illinois Institute of Technology in Chicago, Illinois.

== Career ==
Ceasar began her career in the defense department at Northrop Grumman. She then moved to work at Motorola from 1988 to 1996, working in component design, manufacturing, quality, and building pagers. As Director of Manufacturing, Ceasar was the highest-ranking black female engineer at Motorola's Paging Products Group, which had over 10,000 associates globally. In 1996 she started at Scientific-Atlanta as Vice President of Quality, where she was the highest ranking African American. Ceasar then worked as vice president and general manager of the Georgia branch of Charter Communications, before starting as Vice President of the product engineering, cross platform and engineering services of Comcast in 2007. She became Vice President of National Video Deployment Engineering for Comcast in 2011, leading the development of services such as the X1 remote, cloud DVR, and building infrastructure of the cloud.

== Awards ==
In 1994, Ceasar won the Black Engineer of the Year Special Recognition Award. In 1997, she won the Women of Color Technology Award, sponsored by Career Communications Group during Baltimore's Bicentennial Celebration. She also received the Society of Women Engineers' Distinguished New Engineer of the Year, and the Julia Beveridge Award for her support of the Illinois Institute of Technology. She was inducted into the Women in Technology Hall of Fame in 1999. She also served as president of the Society of Women Engineers from 1999 to 2000, becoming the first African American to hold the position. In 2003, Ceasar won a Cable & Telecommunications Association for Marketing (CTAM) TAMI Award for launching master courses on advanced digital services. In 2014, she won the Women in Technology Award.
