= Alma Martinez Fallon =

Dominican and American engineer

Alma U. Martinez Fallon (born 1958) is a retired marine engineer who worked for many years on the design and construction of military ships at Newport News Shipbuilding and its successor organizations, Northrop Grumman Newport News and Huntington Ingalls Industries. Originally from the Dominican Republic, she emigrated with her family to the US when she was a child. She was president of the Society of Women Engineers.

== Early life and education ==
Martinez Fallon was born on December 1, in 1958 in Constanza, Dominican Republic, the youngest of three children; her mother was a teacher and her father was a forester. In the mid-1960s they moved to San Juan de la Maguana and then Santo Domingo, and in late 1967 they emigrated to New York City. After a year in public school in Queens, New York, she was educated in a Catholic school. She started her college education at Hunter College, intending to become a mathematics teacher. However, she married at age eighteen, divorced at age 22, left college without graduating, and became a bank clerk in Newport News, Virginia.

In 1984, at age 24, she returned to school, inspired by her bank customers (many of whom were shipbuilding engineers) to pursue engineering instead of mathematics education. She spent an academic year in electrical engineering at Stony Brook University, but then transferred to Old Dominion University, where she completed her degree in mechanical engineering in 1987.

== Career and later life ==
Martinez Fallon began working at Newport News Shipbuilding as a co-op student in 1985. Despite multiple other job offers after she graduated, she remained there, initially working on piping in the Seawolf-class submarine. After additional work on military "roll-on/roll-off" ships for transporting vehicles and commercial shipbuilding, she moved into engineering management in the early 1990s. Her subsequent positions involved steel fabrication and supply chain management, eventually becoming corporate director of strategic planning before retiring.

Martinez Fallon was the 41st president of the Society of Women Engineers, serving from 2003 to 2004. She was also elected to the board of governors of the American Society of Mechanical Engineers (ASME), the first Hispanic person to serve on the board. She chaired the American Association of Engineering Societies in 2007.

== Recognition ==
Martinez Fallon was one of five recipients of the 1997 Distinguished New Engineer Award of the Society of Women Engineers. In 2000, she was named as a "one of America's leading minority women in technology" by the magazines Hispanic Engineer, U.S. Black Engineer, and Information Technology, at the Fifth Annual Women of Color Technology Awards Conference. She was elected as an ASME Fellow in 2003.
