= Ruth Schnapp =

Structural engineer and equal rights activist

- Born: Ruth Gordon; September 19, 1926; Seattle, Washington
- Died: January 1, 2014 (aged 87); Los Banos, California
- Education: Masters at Stanford University in Civil Engineering
- Children: 3

Ruth Schnapp (née Gordon; September 19, 1926 – January 1, 2014) was California's first female structural engineer and an equal rights activist.

== Early life and education ==
Ruth Gordon was born on September 19, 1926 in Seattle, Washington.

Schnapp applied to prestigious universities at the advice of her father, one of these being Stanford. She was admitted and one of thirteen women engineering students entering that year and the only to graduate in civil engineering.

She worked at Boeing over the summers in Seattle, where she was from. However, when the war in Japan ended, Boeing announced that all of the female staff were to be demoted to typist positions at a vastly reduced wage. This was a far cry from the manual work Schnapp was doing and the experience she gained in both design and disaster prevention. In protest, she typed everything given to her as slowly as possible. She also faced discrimination back at university. One instance involved the attire of her and her fellow engineers. Sensibly, Schnapp and her fellow female engineers wore jeans to their class involving welding and because they did not have time to change after they would arrive at the cafeteria for dinner without the traditional/proper "Ladies' Attire". The school enacted a regulation after this that "no women were to be seen on campus without the appropriate attire again". This struck Schnapp as very unfair and dangerous, so she fought the regulation and Stanford ultimately agreed and made an exemption.

== Career ==
After graduating Stanford in 1950, the main issue became finding a job that would hire a female engineer. Finally, she was hired by the firm of Isadore Thompson. Schnapp was set right away overseeing work at a hospital in Southern California that was employing new welding fastening techniques in its construction. Schnapp slowly became more and more respected by her peers and advanced steadily. Somehow finding the time between raising three children and working in the field, she studied for the California Structural Engineer's license and passed the exam her first try.

She worked on large scale projects like the San Francisco Public Library, the Palace of the Legion of Honor, San Quentin Prison, and the San Francisco Asian Art museum. She also fought to gain better representation for women in engineering, joining the Society of Women Engineers (SWE). She twice resigned from the national SWE when she considered they had not taken sufficiently strong stances on wider equality in the workplace issues in both 1960 and 1980. She remained a member of her local Golden Gate SWE chapter as she approved of the positive work it did, and donated $1,000 per year to their local scholarship fund for promising women engineers. Schnapp gave one hundred talks to school-children about what engineers do and how girls can join the profession.

In 1984, Schnapp made the decision to go into business herself and founded Pegasus Engineering, Inc., a company that performed earthquake and natural disaster structural assessments for the next 17 years.

== Personal life ==
Ruth Gordon married Michael Schnapp straight out of college in a house with thirteen bedrooms and seven bathrooms which had previously been owned by Lillian Gilbreth. She had three children. She and her husband enjoyed boating.

By 2001, Ruth Schnapp retired at the age of 74 and continued her work of talking to children and adults about earthquake safety and encouraging women to join the engineering field.

Schnapp was also active in support of equal rights including the protest at the Pacific Stock Exchange on August 26, 1980.
