= Frances Hurwitz =

American engineer

- Born: Frances Irene Mazze; 1945 (age 80–81)
- Citizenship: American
- Education: Harpur College SUNY Binghamton; Syracuse University; Case Western Reserve University
- Known for: Aerogel Development; Heat Resistant Space Material
- Spouse: Leon Hurwitz
- Children: 2
- Awards: 2000 NASA Exceptional Achievement Medal 2003 NASA Team Achievement Award 2014 SWE Achievement Award 2015 NASA Exceptional Technology Achievement Medal
- Scientific career
- Fields: Macromolecular Science; Chemistry; Ceramics
- Workplaces: NASA Glenn Research Center
- Thesis: (1979)

Frances Irene Mazze Hurwitz (born 1945) is an American materials research engineer at NASA Glenn Center, Cleveland, Ohio. Hurwitz is known for her work on heat-resistant materials, aerogels, Space Shuttle Columbia Accident Investigation and Shuttle Return to Flight. Hurwitz studied at Harpur College -SUNY Binghamton, Syracuse University, and Case Western Reserve University. She has been and continues to be instrumental in the development of aerogels used at NASA and in developing and testing new aerospace materials.

== Education ==
Born in New York City, Hurwitz attended Harpur College at SUNY Binghamton from 1963-1966 and graduated with a Bachelor of Arts in Chemistry. She worked as a chemist at a pharmaceutical company for a short time before returning to school at Syracuse University, where she received a Master's degree in Library Science at the School of Information Studies at Syracuse in 1968. While at Syracuse University, she was employed as an indexer at Upstate Medical Center on one of the first medical information retrieval systems based upon the National Library of Medicine's indexing system; her first published paper was on literature indexing. On completion of her M.S. in Library Science, she worked in a pharmaceutical company as a technical reference librarian. Hurwitz then went on to pursue her M.S (1976) and Ph.D. (1979) degrees in Macromolecular Science and Engineering at Case Western Reserve University’s School of Engineering in the Department of Macromolecular Science

== Career ==
Frances Hurwitz was initially hired by NASA as a chemist in 1979 at the Glenn Research Center. She has now become a Senior Materials Research Engineer specializing in thermal protection systems and in aerogels based materials, creating new materials for aeronautics and space applications. Hurwitz is a member of the American Chemical Society, the American Ceramic Society and the Society of Women Engineers

She served as Chief of the Polymers Branch of the Materials and Structures Division from February 2012 to February 2013. She was also a member of several Space Shuttle Return to Flight teams and has represented NASA on various Department of Defense Technical Advisory Committees. She currently works as Senior Materials Research Engineer at NASA Glenn Center.

=== Space Shuttle Columbia ===
On February 1, 2003, the Space Shuttle Columbia broke apart upon re-entry to Earth. Frances Hurwitz was a consultant to the Columbia Accident Investigation Board (CAIB). Her efforts contributed to receipt of a NASA Team Achievement Award in 2003 for testing of materials to resolve failure mechanisms as part of the CAIB investigation. Since Return to Flight, she has continued research on thermal aging of space materials and has led research efforts in ceramic matrix composites, thermal protection systems, and lightweight aerogel materials.

=== Aerogels ===
Aerogels are composed of 99.8% air, or empty space. This solid matter is usually made by removing the liquid from Silica Gels, leaving behind just the molecular structure of Silicon Dioxide (SiO_{2}). Hurwitz has, instead, researched producing aerogels with a different chemical composition so the properties of aerogels, like the temperature limits, would increase and allow space travel to be safer. She has helped create an Aluminosilicate aerogel, which caused the lower thermal conductivities of the aerogels to be able to withstand temperatures higher than 900. This allows this material to better insulate space shuttles and materials in space and in re-entry of the space objects, causing less damage to the shuttle itself and the people inside it. In the same research project, she experimented with aerogels by adding in Titanium to the Aluminosilicate gels, which allowed for bigger average pore sizes and higher pore volumes. She concluded that by adding Titanium to Aluminosilicate gels, the lower thermal conductivities can now go up to temperatures of 1,200 instead of the 900 limit of regular Silicon Dioxide gels. In addition, Hurwitz has conducted research that has shown a way to image aerogels with very small pores through the use of scanning electron microscopes. She and her team inserted nitrogen gas to neutralize negative charges in the gels which can then allow the SEM to be able to scan and successfully plot out the aerogel in detail with the pores shown, even pores as small as 3 nm in diameter

=== Current research ===
Since 2007, she has established techniques for fabricating composites for entry, descent, landing, and space power systems. She has also continued her work with aerogels at over 700. She is a technical advisor on materials for NASA programs including space power systems. Since 2012, she has been involved in research on insulation for inflatable decelerators for planetary and earth entry. The insulation used in the research is made of the aerogels that she has helped develop as they can withstand higher temperatures than others (see Previous Research section). These aerogels are also better to use because they are lighter than other materials which can resist the same amount of heat, causing the shuttle to be lighter than it would with the other materials and would make it easier to launch into space. These materials make it safer for re-entry since they are very good at heat insulation and can help reduce the risk of a shuttle burning up upon re-entry. She is currently exploring the shrinkage and toxicity of various Aluminosilicate gels that are being investigated.

== Personal life ==
The first person in her family to go to college was her uncle, who received a B.S. and M.S. degrees in electrical engineering. Her parents did not go to college, but they did place a high value on education for their children. However, her parents had expectations of them to go to college, get a bachelor's degree and go straight into the workforce, which caused Hurwitz to put off going to graduate school. She eventually went back to school and completed master's degree. Frances Hurwitz has one sister who also graduated from SUNY Binghamton. Frances married Leon Hurwitz in 1968. They moved to Cleveland, Ohio in 1969 when Leon accepted a position as an instructor in the Department of Political Science at Cleveland State University. Frances and Leon have 2 children, Elise J. Hurwitz (b. 1970) and Jonathan S. Hurwitz (b.1972), and four grandchildren.

== Awards and honors ==
Frances Hurwitz has won over 20 NASA awards and the Society of Women Engineers Achievement Award. Two NASA awards have highlighted her career: the NASA Medal for Exceptional Achievement in 2000 “for exceptional scientific and leadership contributions that have had major impacts on several NASA and Department of Defense national ceramics programs.” She also was recognized with a NASA Team Achievement Award in 2003 due to her work on the Columbia Space Shuttle disaster (see Space Shuttle Columbia). In 2014, she received the Society of Women Engineers’ highest award and recognition, the Achievement Award, based upon her research for NASA, “exceptional leadership skills across disciplines”, and her work to make the work environment more equal for women. She has over 60 publications, has been cited over 550 times, and has contributed to 4 book chapters, over 100 scholarly articles, a patent), and has several patents pending

== Selected publications ==
- Frances I. Hurwitz, Haiquan Guo, Richard B. Rogers, Erik J. Sheets, Derek R. Miller, Katy N. Newlin, Molly K. Shave, Anna R. Palczer, Michael T. Cox, “Influence of Ti addition on Boehmite-Derived Aluminum Silicate Aerogel: Structure and Properties”, J Sol-Gel Sci Technol. 64(2): 367-374 DOI 10.1007/s10971-012-2866-8 (2012).
- F. I. Hurwitz, M. K Shave, Richard B. Rogers, A. R. Palczer, H. Guo, “Influence of Boehmite Precursor on Structure and Properties of Aluminosilicate Aerogels”, Int. J. Appl. Glass Sci., 5(3) 276-286 (2014). DOI:10.1111/ijag.12070.
- Hurwitz, Frances (2011). “Thermal Protection Systems”. Encyclopedia of Aerospace Engineering. Volume 4: Materials Technology. ISBN 978-0-470-75440-5, DOI: 10.1002/9780470686652 eae211.
- Sola, Francisco, Frances Hurwitz, Jijing Yang. 2011. "A New Scanning Electron Microscope Approach to Image Aerogels at the Nanoscale." IOPScience. Volume 22.
- Hurwitz, Frances I., Meghan Gallagher, Tracy C. Olin, Molly K. Shave, Marlyssa A. Ittes, Katy N... Olafson, Meredith G. Fields, Haiquan Guo, Richard B. Rogers. "Optimization of Alumina and Aluminosilicate Aerogel Structure for High-Temperature Performance". International Journal of Applied Glass Science 5 (3): 276-286. doi:10.1111/ijag.12070.
