= Shirley E. Schwartz =

American chemist (1935–2016)

- Born: August 26, 1935; Detroit, Michigan, U.S.
- Died: May 8, 2016 (aged 80); Ann Arbor, Michigan, U.S.
- Education: University of Michigan, Wayne State University
- Employer(s): BASF, General Motors

Shirley Ellen Schwartz or Ellen Shirley Schwartz (August 26, 1935 – May 8, 2016) was an American chemist and research scientist at General Motors, specializing in the study and development of industrial lubricants and automobile oil change indicator systems. She was inducted into the Michigan Women's Hall of Fame in 1996 for her accomplishments in the field of chemistry.

== Early life and education ==
Born Ellen Shirley Eckwall in Detroit, Schwartz grew up in the Detroit suburb of Pleasant Ridge, and graduated from Lincoln High School in Ferndale. She earned three academic degrees in chemistry. She attended the University of Michigan where she received her Bachelor of Science degree in chemistry in 1957. Schwartz then enrolled at Wayne State University and earned her master's degree 1962 and her doctorate in 1970.

== Career ==
After teaching at Oakland Community College and the Detroit Institute of Technology, Schwartz began working at BASF Corporation in Wyandotte, Michigan, where she developed an industrial lubricant that, by virtue of being primarily water, reduced the amount of oil and consequently pollution. She then spent over 18 years working at General Motors, where she was senior research scientist, working in Research and Development Operations at the General Motors Technical Center in Warren, Michigan. During her career she came to hold more than 20 patents, and authored 173 technical papers. From 1989 to 2003 she wrote a regular column titled Love Letters to Lubrication Engineers in the journal of the Society of Tribologists and Lubrication Engineers, and was remembered in a 2016 memorial in that journal as "the mother of the oil life monitor found in most GM cars, which is responsible for not having to change oil nearly as often as we did previously, or conversely, not ruining your engine if you don't change it often enough."

When presenting her with an achievement award in 1999, the Society of Women Engineers summarized Dr. Schwartz's career thusly:

"Dr. Schwartz has examined engine oil degradation; wear, corrosion, and elastomer durability in engines; the effects of methanol and ethanol fuel on engines; and lubricants for air conditioners that use alternative refrigerants (other than Freon R12). Her work in these areas have been targeted towards:

- obtaining the maximum useful life of engine oil
- finding acceptable ways to use alternative energy sources
- developing refrigerant systems that will not hurt the earth's ozone layer"

== Awards and honors ==
Schwartz was named a fellow of the Society of Automotive Engineers in 1999 and was elected to the National Academy of Engineering in 2000 "for contributions to lubrication engineering and for enriching the technical community through free-lance writing." She additionally received many industry awards:

- General Motors Kettering Award (1988): Awarded for computer-based method that assesses engine oil degradation as a function of oil temperature and displays the remaining life of the oil for the vehicle
- General Motors McCuen Award (1993)
- Gold Award from the Engineering Society of Detroit (1989)
- Wilbur Deutsch Memorial Award from the Society of Tribologists and Lubrication Engineers (1987)
- Colwell Award (1992) from the Society of Automotive Engineers
- Distinguished Speaker Award (1995) from the Society of Automotive Engineers

== Personal life ==
Schwartz married her husband, Ron Schwartz, in 1957.
