= Ada Pressman =

American mechanical engineer

- Born: Ada Irene Richardson; 1927; Sidney, Ohio
- Died: 2003 (aged 75–76)
- Education: The Ohio State University, BS, 1950; Golden Gate University, MBA, 1974
- Spouse: Marvin Pressman (1969-1970)
- Engineering career
- Discipline: Mechanical Engineering, power plant controls and process instrumentation
- Employers: Bailey Meter, Bechtel Corporation
- Projects: Sacramento Municipal Utility District Rancho Seco 1 nuclear unit
- Awards: Society of Women Engineers Achievement Award

Ada Irene Pressman (nee Richardson, 1927-2003) was an American mechanical engineer who was one of the nation’s experts in power plant controls and process instrumentation throughout her career. A pioneer in combustion control and burner management for supercritical power plants, Pressman managed 18 design teams for more than 20 generating plants worldwide. She received the Society of Women Engineers’ (SWE) Achievement Award in 1976. Pressman was also a President and Fellow of the organization.

== Early life ==
Pressman was born, grew up, and attended school in Sidney, Ohio. Her father wanted her to attend college, but only had funds adequate to finance one year. She selected to attend The Ohio State University, studying something that was easy – engineering! She was able to stay through graduation, earning her mechanical engineering BS degree in 1950.

== Career ==
She went to work for Bailey Meter in Cleveland, Ohio – the only job offer she received at graduation and only because she had worked summers for the company and she had challenged the owner about his statement that there were many job opportunities for women engineers. After four years, she secured a position at Bechtel Corporation which was looking for a process instrumentation engineer. Pressman stayed at Bechtel through the remainder of her career rising eventually to chief engineer and then engineering manager.

Pressman was involved in the early design of more automatic controls for equipment and systems, new packaging techniques, and breakthroughs in improving the precision and reliability of sensors and controls. These developments led to the systems engineering approach which later became its own discipline and for which she advocated.

From 1968 to 1971, Pressman served as the supervisor of the control systems engineering group for the Sacramento Municipal Utility District’s Rancho Seco 1 nuclear unit. This 900 MW unit was the first nuclear power plant built in an area remote from a major body of water. Unique and creative design solutions were required to address the many unusual design and environmental problems and constraints mandated by the location. Elaborate control systems were required for each evaporative cooling system, the radiological waste removal and disposal system, and the water discharge system. All design facets posed major engineering challenges, not only for the usual power plant primary and secondary systems. This nuclear unit incorporated the first electro-hydraulic turbine control system, seven special closed-cycle cooling systems, a safety feature actuation system, special sampling systems, and cut-off systems for the wastewater retention basin. Pressman was also responsible for the review, verification, and control system integration for vital systems designed by others, including reactor protector systems, makeup and purification of reactor coolant, core flooding systems, high-pressure injection systems for emergency purposes, and gaseous and liquid effluents systems.

== Awards and honors ==
Pressman received the Society of Women Engineers’ Achievement award in 1976 In recognition of her significant contributions in the field of power control systems engineering.

Pressman received the 1974 Distinguished Alumni Award from The Ohio State University and the Twin Award from the YWCA in 1976. (Pressman n.d.b.; SWE 2024). She was elected a Fellow of the Instrument Society of America (ISA). She received the Los Angeles Section of the ISA’s W.A. Kates Award in 1971 and 1972 for outstanding participation. Pressman was elected a Fellow of the Los Angeles Institute for the Advancement of Engineering (1971) and also received that organization’s Outstanding Engineer Merit Award (1975). The Engineer of Southern California selected her as Engineer of the Month in 1968. The Long Beach Engineering Council named her 1979 Engineer of the Year. Pressman was also recognized with the Outstanding Engineering Merit Award from Bechtel Power Corporation.

== Legacy ==
Pressman was the first woman to hold the chief engineer and engineering manager positions at Bechtel Corporation. She was the first woman to be elected President of any section of the Instrument Society of America (1969).

In 2014, The Ohio State University Department of Mechanical Engineering established the Ada Irene Pressman Award. It is “presented to alumni who have made noteworthy contributions to their chosen professions while overcoming significant obstacles or barriers to the completion of their education and/or obstacles in their careers.”

Because of her significant service to SWE and the Board of Trustees, The Ada Pressman Society was established for those individuals who tell SWE that they have a planned gift to SWE after their death through a bequest.

== Affiliations ==
Pressman was a member of the Instrument Society of America (ISA), served as a national Vice President. She was also a member of the American Nuclear Society and the Southern California Meter Association. As a student and early in her career, she was a member of the American Society of Mechanical Engineers.

She was a registered professional engineer in Arizona and California. Pressman appeared before the State of California Board of Registration of Civil and Professional Engineers and presented a statement supporting control systems engineering as a separate discipline. It was established as such in 1975; she became the first person to be registered under it.

== Personal life ==
Pressman was an avid golfer—always ready to play. She was a member of the Rio Hondo Women’s Golf Club and the Griffith Park Women’s Golf Club. Additionally, she was a member of the Order of the Eastern Star and the Delta Zeta Sorority. She married Marvin Pressman on October 4, 1969, and was widowed in 1970. Her other outside interests included traveling, bowling, bicycling, and photography.
