= Suzanne Jenniches =

American engineer

- Born: Pennsylvania, U.S.
- Education: Clarion University of Pennsylvania
- Occupations: Entrepreneur, Engineer

F. Suzanne Jenniches (born 1949) is an American engineer who served from April 2, 2003, to 2010 as the vice president and general manager of Government Systems Division of Northrop Grumman Corp.'s Electronic Systems sector. She holds a patent for laser soldering. She was the only woman to take engineering evening classes at Johns Hopkins University in the 1970s. She was both the first female engineer and the first intern at Westinghouse Electric Company. She is one of the first female leaders at Northrop Grumman, and considered a pioneer by the Society of Women Engineers.

== Early life ==
The firstborn of one son and two daughters, Jenniches is the first in her family to have a college degree. Her parents both graduated from high school and owned their own business. Running a business required long, 12- to 14-hour work days. Jenniches learned the value of work ethic through her parents.

Jenniches's parents also taught her personal responsibility. They told her that if there was a problem at school, then she must have contributed to it-

because your teachers -- why would they set out to do something that would hurt you? And so I learned early on to sort of take responsibility for myself and what happened to me, not to find other reasons outside of myself for not succeeding, but realizing that my success depended upon myself and the participation and contribution that I made.
– Suzanne Jenniches

Every Christmas, Jenniches' father, a mechanic with a service station garage and correspondence trade school student, gave her a power tool as a present. When she moved on to college, she brought the tools with her: sanders, circular saws, miter boxes, drills, and other equipment. Atypical for women at the time, it was Jenniches, not her husband, who supplied mechanical tools for the household.

In high school, Jenniches's guidance counselor encouraged her to go to college. When Clarion State College recruiters visited her school, Jenniches accepted their invitation and applied to one school. She received a full scholarship. In hindsight, even though her engineering career ultimately succeeded, she regretted the early aimlessness and lack of planning.

My expectations were that I would be a beautician, which is a very honorable vocation in Western Pennsylvania, but never did I ever think of becoming a teacher or becoming an engineer... My whole childhood was a series of bumping into fortunate experiences. That’s why I’m so active in the Society of Women Engineers, I really want young people not to have to bump along, but to have people that help them along the way.
– Suzanne Jenniches

== Education ==
In 1970, Jenniches earned a Bachelor of Science degree in Biology from Clarion State College (now PennWest Clarion). Engineering was not an option. She believed there were only two choices open to her as a young female biology major: a nurse or a teacher. She became a biology teacher.

While working as a teacher, Jenniches began to work toward an engineering degree. She attended evening school at Johns Hopkins, four nights a week, for seven years. She was the only woman at the evening engineering school for a number of years. In 1979, Jenniches earned a master's degree in environmental engineering from Johns Hopkins University.

Jenniches completed extensive post-graduate work in international affairs at The Catholic University of America. She has also attended the Harvard Business School Program for Management Development.

== Career ==
Jenniches began her career in science as a high school biology teacher, teaching ecology, in Westminster, Maryland. During this time, she received a magazine in the mail from the National Education Association. It was 1970, the first year of Earth Day. On the back cover, she found an ad from Johns Hopkins University. There was a post card to fill, tear out, and send in. Once again, she decided to change her career path on a whim. She applied to go to graduate school at Johns Hopkins by impulse. One of the items on the back cover flyer was the environmental engineering.

"If a pioneer is somebody who breaks new ground and makes it easier for others to go ahead, then I’m proud to be called a pioneer."

— Suzanne Jenniches, on being labeled a pioneer.

At Johns Hopkins's evening school, Jenniches's peers influenced her to work at Westinghouse Electric Company. It was the first time Westinghouse attained a female engineer, so they had to create an unusual exception for her: an internship. She would be the only woman there, and the only person that had ever had an internship. Jenniches accepted the unique opportunity. She quit teaching and worked at Westinghouse as an associate engineer. She worked there, as an intern and a woman, for two weeks, unpaid, in a plant, with no security clearance, all while still attending evening classes to complete her engineering degree. No one had ever done that before. As a part of her job, she used keypunch digital tapes to program read-only memories, a PROM programmer. She worked harder than most people. She would often be on-call, sometimes waking from home at 3 o'clock in the morning to attend to emergency data requirements.

In the beginning of her engineer career, Jenniches changed jobs every eighteen months for two years. She kept the same telephone number and used it to advance her career within the company. She worked in computer test engineering, electronic assembly, advanced robotic manufacturing, radar systems, and defense programs. She engineered for Northrop Grumman (previously known as Westinghouse), and stayed at that corporation for more than thirty years.

In 1980, she obtained a patent for laser soldering. In 1981 she led operations for the B-1B bomber offensive radar. She oversaw the production of the first electronically scanned antenna for production aircraft in the world.

Jenniches has held many leadership positions at Northrop Grumman Corp: In 1986, she was appointed manager of Systems & Technology Operations. Later she became Vice President of Automation and Information Systems, Vice President of Communications Systems (Electronic Systems sector). In 2003, she became the Vice President of the Government Systems Division.

== Societies ==
From 1988 to 1989, Jenniches was the president of the Society of Women Engineers. From 1996 to 2003, she served on the Board of Directors for MICROS, Inc. From 1999 to 2006, She served as a Member as a United States Army Science Board. She has also served on the American Association of Engineering Societies Board of Governors and as an expert witness before Congress on numerous occasions. She advocated on behalf of engineering for NASA, NIST, AAES, and SWE.

== Awards ==
Jenniches earned the Distinguished New Engineer Award in 1983 and the Achievement Award in 2000. Jenniches has received numerous awards.
