= Roberta J. Nichols =

American engineer (1931–2005)

- Born: November 29, 1931; Venice, CA
- Died: April 3, 2005 (aged 73); Plymouth MI
- Occupation: Engineer

Roberta J. Nichols (November 29, 1931 Venice, CA – April 3, 2005, Plymouth MI) was an engineer and the Retired Manager, Electric Vehicle External Strategy at Ford Motor Company. She was a founding member of the advisory board for the College of Engineering - Center for Environmental Research & Technology (CE-CERT) at the University of California, Riverside. She authored or co-authored over 60 publications and was the holder of three patents for the flexible-fuel vehicle (FFV).

== Education ==
Nichols received her Ph.D. in Engineering from University of Southern California in 1979.

== Career ==
She worked for the Ford Motor Company on alternative fuels for 19 years, retiring in 1995. She helped to establish the research center at the University of California, Riverside and she contributed to the overall engineering program at UCR.

== Patents ==
- Control system for engine operation using two fuels of different volumetric energy content; Patent number: 4706629
- Control system for engine operation using two fuels of different volatility; Patent number: 4706630
- Spark timing control of multiple fuel engine; Patent number: 4703732

== Memberships ==
Nichols was a Fellow of the Society of Automotive Engineers. She was a Fellow of the Society of Women Engineers. She was a Member of the National Academy of Engineering and she was a member of the American Society of Mechanical Engineers. She was a University of California at Riverside CE-CERT Board member.

== Awards ==
- National Achievement Award from the Society of Women Engineers 1988
- Gene Ecklund Award, US Department of Energy 1996
- Clean Air Award for Advancing Air Pollution Technology, SCAQMD 1989
