= Ümit Özkan =

Turkish-American chemical engineer

Ümit Sivrioğlu Özkan is a Turkish and American chemical engineer whose research involves the development of novel materials such as carbon nanostructures for heterogeneous catalysis and electrocatalysis that avoid the use of precious metals, with applications including fuel cells, water treatment, the breakdown of organic molecules, the conversion of carbon dioxide to other materials, and the production of hydrogen and ammonia. She works at Ohio State University as Distinguished University Professor, College of Engineering Distinguished Professor, and chair of the William G. Lowrie Department of Chemical and Biomolecular Engineering.

== Education and career ==
Özkan is originally from Ankara, one of three children in a middle-income family. After graduating from Robert College in 1973, she was a student at the Middle East Technical University, where she received a bachelor's degree in 1978 and a master's degree in 1980. She completed her Ph.D. in 1984 at Iowa State University. Her dissertation, Simple molybdate selective oxidation catalysts containing excess $\ce{MoO_3}$ for $\ce{C_4}$ hydrocarbon oxidation to maleic anhydride, was supervised by Glenn L. Schrader.

She joined the Ohio State University faculty as an assistant professor in 1985, and was promoted to associate professor in 1990 and full professor in 1994. She was named as College of Engineering Distinguished Professor in 2012, given an endowed professorship in 2019, and became department chair in 2019. As well as being the first woman faculty member in chemical engineering at the university, she is the first woman to chair her department.

She has served as chair of the American Chemical Society (ACS) Petroleum Chemistry Division from 2001 to 2002, and helped found the American Institute of Chemical Engineers (AIChE) Catalysis and Reaction Engineering Division.

== Recognition ==
Özkan was elected as a Fellow of the AIChE and the American Association for the Advancement of Science in 2010, and as a Fellow of the ACS in 2011. In 2024 she was named to the National Academy of Engineering, elected "for her research in electrocatalysis and elucidation of mechanisms of oxidation catalysis".

Middle East Technical University gave her their Professor Somer Distinguished Alumni Award in 2002. She was named a Fulbright Senior Research Scholar in 2007, and was a Claude Bernard University Lyon 1–CNRS Lecturer in France. In 2010 she was a John van Geuns Lecturer at the University of Amsterdam.

The Society of Women Engineers gave Özkan their 2002 SWE Achievement Award. She received the Henry H. Storch Award of the ACS Energy and Fuels Division in 2017, the first woman to receive the award. She received the 2023 Robert Burwell Lectureship in Catalysis of the North American Catalysis Society, "recognized for her pioneering work that bridged the heterogeneous catalysis and electrocatalysis fields". She received the ACS George Olah Award in 2024, and the AIChE Margaret H. Rousseau Pioneer Award in 2024, given "for bridging heterogeneous catalysis and electrocatalysis; for being an outstanding teacher and mentor; and for blazing trails in every aspect of her professional life".
