= Mary Blade =

American engineer (1913–1994)

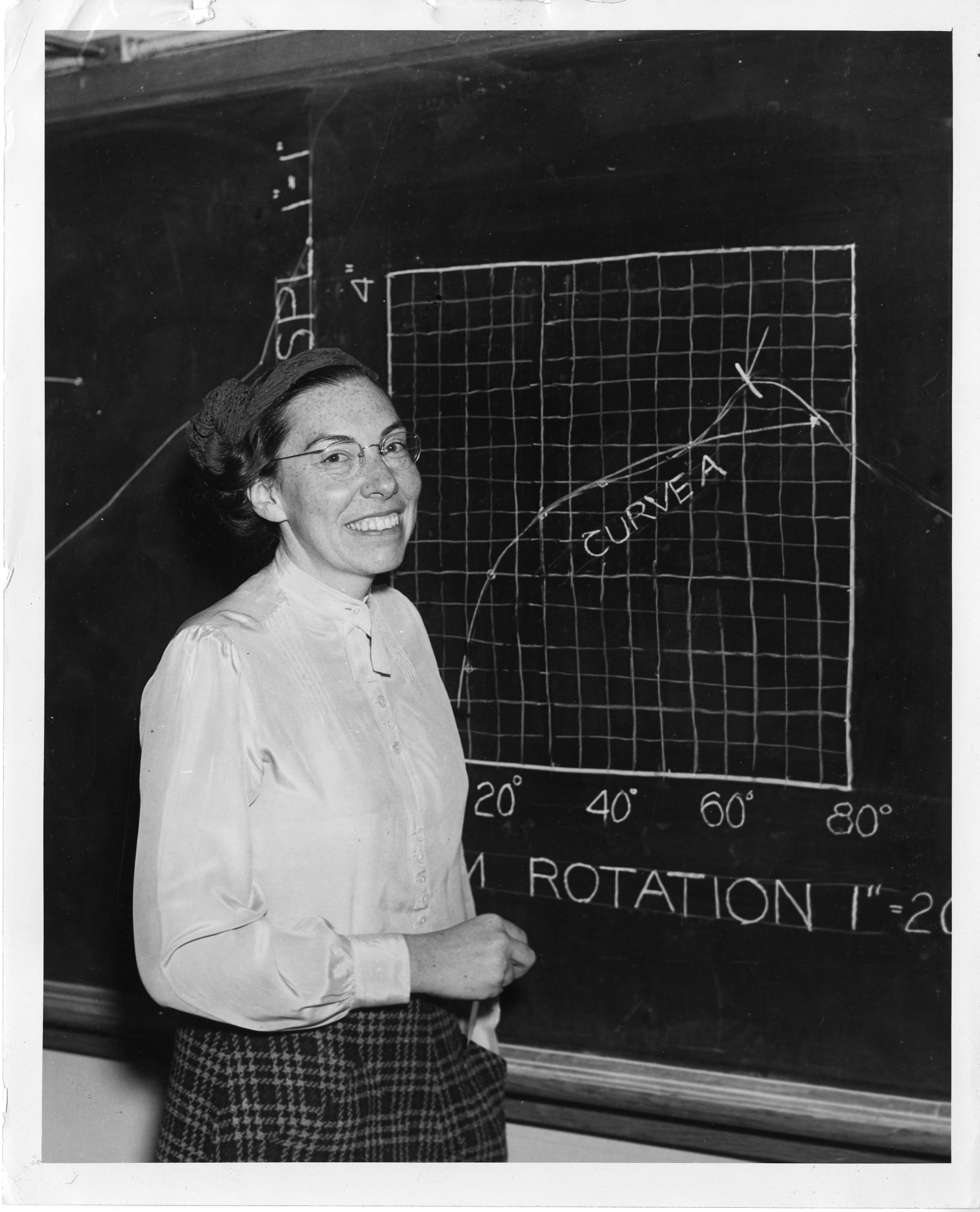
- Blade in 1946
- Born: January 20, 1913; Salt Lake City, Utah, US
- Died: December 4, 1994 (aged 81)
- Other names: Mary Frances Plumb, Mary Francis Blade
- Education: University of Utah (B.S. 1934); Columbia University (M.S.)
- Scientific career
- Fields: industrial engineering, mechanical engineering
- Workplaces: The Cooper Union for the Advancement of Science and Art

Mary Plumb Blade (20 January 1913 – 4 December 1994) was an American engineer, director of the Green Camp from 1955 to 1972, and full-time professor of mechanical engineering in the engineering school of The Cooper Union for the Advancement of Science and Art from 1946 to 1978.

== Early life and education ==
Mary Frances Plumb was born on 20 January 1913 in Salt Lake City to Maude Irene (nee Augustine) and Hylon Theron Plumb, an electrical engineer.

She graduated with a B.S. in engineering from the University of Utah, the first woman to do so, and an M.S. in industrial engineering from Columbia University. She was a member of the Delta Delta Delta sorority.

== Career ==
At the time of her appointment as a professor, Blade was "the only woman on the Cooper Union engineering faculty (where she initially taught drawing, mathematics and design) and one of few women on any engineering faculty in the United States". Her obituary stated that she was the first woman professor of mechanical/electrical engineering in New York City.

Mary Blade helped organize the May 27–28, 1950 inaugural weekend of the Society of Women Engineers at Cooper Union's Green Engineering Camp.

In 1978, Blade was featured in Chair: The current state of the art, with the who, the why, and the what of it by Peter Bradford and Barbara Prete with a chapter titled "Physical Forces and Damages, Your Sitting Behavior, Move."

In 1980, the Engineering Design Graphics Division of the American Society for Engineering Education awarded Blade its Distinguished Service Award.

== Personal life ==
Mary Plumb married engineer Ellis Hardin Blade (1908–1986) on 31 December 1934 in Manhattan, New York and was known as Mary Blade or Mary Plumb Blade after this time. They were married for 62 years. Blade was also an avid and accomplished mountain climber.

Professor Mary Plumb Blade died in Vancouver General Hospital on 4 December 1994, having suffered from Alzheimer's disease in her final years. She was survived by three siblings and "22 grand and great-grand nieces and nephews and her feline companion, Miss America of Vancouver".
