= Arminta Harness =

American aeronautical engineer

Lieutenant Colonel Arminta Jean Harness
- Born: March 2, 1928; Oilton, Oklahoma
- Died: February 17, 2010 (aged 81)
- Burial place: Northern California Veterans Cemetery
- Education: University of Southern California
- Occupation: Aeronautical Engineer

Arminta Jean Harness (March 2, 1928 – February 17, 2010) was the first woman engineer to join the US Air Force. She served for 24 years in the Air Force, and became the president of the Society of Women Engineers in 1976–1978.

== Early life and education ==
Arminta Jean Harness was born in 1928 in Oilton, Oklahoma. Her father was in the oil business, meaning that she spent much of her childhood moving around, however, they would always return to Oilton to visit family.

Amelia Earhart was an important role model for Harness growing up. She had read all three of Earhart's books and treasured a signed copy of The Fun of It. As a result of this inspiration, Harness decided in her sophomore year of high school to become an aeronautical engineer. After graduating from high school, Harness started her studies at Lindenwood College for Women but left after two years. She then enrolled at the University of Southern California and was the second woman to graduate with a Bachelor of Engineering degree in Aeronautical Engineering in 1955. She continued her studies on the USC graduate programme in engineering management.

During this time, employment practices prioritised for servicemen returning from World War II, particularly in engineering professions. Consequently, Harness joined the US Air Force to build up some experience in engineering.

== Military service ==
Harness was the first woman engineer to join the US Air Force. She enlisted in 1950 and began her training at the US Air Force Officer Candidate School at Lackland Air Force Base in Texas. After completing her training and spending two years as a recruitment officer, Harness was assigned to Wright-Patterson Air Force Base. She soon became the chief of personnel at the Aerial Reconnaissance Laboratory. In 1954 she moved into an engineering role, where she designed prototypes, wind tunnel testing and flight-testing of aerial weather equipment.

She was part of many of the groundbreaking space exploration programmes including the Gemini Programme and the Apollo Missions. She was based at Los Angeles Air Force Base and had a desk next to Buzz Aldrin for a time.

Harness' military decorations are the following:

- Meritorious Service Medal
- Joint Service Commendation Medal
- Air Force Commendation Medal

Harness was also the first woman to achieve both the senior and master Missile Badge.

== Engineering career ==
Following her military retirement Harness joined Westinghouse Hanford Company in 1974.

In 1978, during Harness' time as the manager of laboratory planning at Westinghouse Harness gave the Verena Holmes Lecture in the United Kingdom in association with the Women's Engineering Society.

In 1979 Harness resigned from the Westinghouse Hanford Company.

== Memberships and legacy ==
As well as being a Life Fellow of the Society of Women Engineers, Harness was the fifteenth president of the Society of Women Engineers from 1976 to 1978 after Carolyn Phillips. She was succeeded by Paula Loring (now Simon).

- President of the Los Angeles Club of Zonta International
- Fellow of the Institute for the Advancement of Engineering
- Fellow Life Member of SWE
- SWE Distinguished Service Award in 2000

== Personal life ==
Following her retirement, Harness dedicated more time to her sculpting. She designed and sculpted the Resnik Challenger Medal awarded by SWE in honour of Judith Resnik.

Harness died on February 17, 2010 and was interred at the Northern California Veterans Cemetery.
