= Giuliana Tesoro =

Organic chemist

Giuliana Cavaglieri Tesoro
- Born: Giuliana Cavaglieri; June 1, 1921; Venice, Italy
- Died: September 29, 2002 (aged 81); Dobbs Ferry, New York
- Occupations: Organic chemist, polymer chemist, inventor, and professor
- Known for: Development of fire-retardant fabrics

Giuliana Tesoro (previously Cavaglieri) (June 1, 1921 – September 29, 2002) was an Italian-born American chemist who earned more than 125 patents, with her most notable consisting of improvements in fabric comfort, practicality, and flame resistance.

== Biography ==
Giuliana Tesoro (previously Cavaglieri) was an Italian-born American chemist whose pioneering work in textile chemistry led to significant advancement in fabric safety and performance. Born on June 1, 1921 in Venice, Italy, to Gino and Margherita Maroni Cavaglierei during the rise of fascism and anti-semtic laws under Benito Mussolini. She began third grade at age six and graduated from Liceo Classico Marco Polo High School at seventeen in 1938. Despite the laws that barred her from higher education in Italy due to her Jewish heritage, she pursued her passion for science with unwavering determination. After obtaining an x-ray technician degree in Geneva, Switzerland, Tesoro immigrated to the United States in 1939 where she then received a Ph.D. in organic chemistry from Yale, at age 21.

Tesoro's professional journey was marked by a series of influential roles. She began her career as a research chemist at Onyx Oil and Chemical where she then climbed the ranks to head of the organic synthesis department and eventually to associate director by 1955. After her ten-year tenure she moved to the Textile Research Institute for two years. In 1969 she accepted a position as a senior chemist at Burlington Industries where she then was appointed director of chemical research in 1971. During this time she was a prolific inventor, having been granted more than two dozen patents in 1970. Transitioning to academia, Tesoro served as a visiting professor in the Department of Mechanical Engineering at the Massachusetts Institute of Technology (MIT) from 1972 to 1976, later becoming an adjunct professor and senior research scientist. She continued her academic contributions as a research professor of polymer chemistry at Polytechnic University (now NYU Tandon School of Engineering) from 1982 until her retirement in 1996. She also often lectured on polymers at conferences worldwide while teaching as well as serving as an editor for the Textile Research Journal.

Giuliana Tesoro died on September 29, 2002, in Dobbs Ferry, New York, at the age of 81.

== Contributions to chemistry and textiles ==
Beyond flame-resistant fabrics, Tesoro contributed to several advancements in textile chemistry, including improvements in fabric durability, wrinkle resistance, and the development of synthetic fibers with enhanced properties. These innovations improved both consumer products and industrial applications, making textiles safer, longer-lasting, and more functional.

Flame-resistant fabrics

One of Tesoro's most significant innovations was the development of flame-resistant fabric. Before her work, cotton and other natural fibers were highly flammable, posing serious risk, especially for workers in high-risk industries like firefighting and electrical engineering. Tesoro developed chemical treatments that made these fibers resistant to fire, drastically reducing burn injuries and deaths. This innovation has had a lasting societal impact, as flame-resistant fabrics continue to be an essential component in protective clothing, including firefighter gear, industrial uniforms, and even household textiles like mattresses and curtains. Her work laid the foundation for materials such as Kevlar and Nomex.

== List of committees and awards ==
Tesoro's expertise was recognized through her active participation in several esteemed organizations, including the National Academy of Sciences and the National Research Council, where she contributed to committees focused on toxic materials and fire safety. She was also a founding member of the Fiber Society (1974) and held memberships in the American Chemical Society, the American Association of Textile Chemists and Colorists, and the American Association for the Advancement of Science. She won the Olney Medal from the American Association of Textile Chemists and Colorists in 1963, and then the Society of Women Engineers Achievement Award in 1978.

The use and development of Giuliana Tesoro's inventions still continue. Flame-resistant fabrics remain important in protective clothing across various industries and are continuously developing to meet modern safety standards and technological advancements.

== Other sources ==
- Dr. Giuliana Tesoro: Famous Woman Inventor
- Giuliana Tesoro helped shape the high-tech fabric industry | Investor's Business Daily
- Giuliana Tesoro. Lemelson
- Giuliana Tesoro biography
