= Nancy Deloye Fitzroy =

American engineer (1927–2024)

Nancy Burr Deloye Fitzroy
- Born: Nancy Burr Deloye; October 5, 1927; Pittsfield, Massachusetts, U.S.
- Died: January 15, 2024 (aged 96); Schenectady, New York, U.S.
- Education: Rensselaer Polytechnic Institute (B.S. Chemical Engineering)
- Occupations: Chemical Engineering, Mechanical Engineering
- Known for: Heat transfer and fluid dynamics
- Spouse(s): Roland Victor Fitzroy, Jr.
- Awards: National Academy of Engineering, Demers Medal RPI, Davies Medal RPI, Centennial Medal ASME, Achievement Award SWE
- Engineering career
- Employer: General Electric
- Projects: Hermes Missile Program, Integrated circuit thermal chip, thermal protection system
- Significant design: Hardened Antenna Element (patent), Male Plug Assembly Incorporating Power (patent), research on heat transfer
- Website: http://nancyfitzroy.org/

Nancy Burr Deloye Fitzroy (October 5, 1927 – January 15, 2024) was an American engineer specializing in heat transfer and fluid dynamics. Fitzroy developed advanced heat transfer solutions for space vehicles, satellites, home appliances, air conditioning, jet engines, gas turbines, steam turbines, nuclear reactor cores, motors, and many other diverse types of equipment. Two of her achievements were the invention of a thermal chip to measure temperature in integrated circuits and a thermal protection system for use in US early warning systems.

Equal to her technical accomplishments was her dedication to expanding the applied literature on heat transfer and fluid flow. She is considered both a chemical and a mechanical engineer.

Fitzroy served as President of the American Society of Mechanical Engineers, was a recipient of the Society of Women Engineers Achievement Award, and was elected into the National Academy of Engineering.

== Early life and education ==
Born Nancy Burr Deloye in Pittsfield, Massachusetts, she was the youngest of six children. From an early age she was fascinated with how things work. Her father flew gliders as a hobby, inspiring Fitzroy to become a pilot while in high school. Years later, she owned and operated a twin-engine Cessna and became a licensed helicopter pilot.

Fitzroy studied chemical engineering at the Rensselaer Polytechnic Institute (RPI), graduating with a bachelor's degree in 1949.

== Career ==
Hired by Knolls Atomic Power Laboratory in 1950, Fitzroy worked as an assistant engineer with the heat transfer group. In 1952, she became a development engineer for General Electric, initially working on the Hermes Missile Program and designing heat transfer surfaces for nuclear reactor cores. Fitzroy worked on a wide variety of heat transfer problems, performing heat transfer analysis, special thermal equipment design, and identifying thermal properties of materials. She consulted on thermal problems in the design of proposed products and the operation of existing equipment, including predicting the thermal behavior of freezing in the copper dip-forming process for wire production, advanced cooling concepts for future motor designs, and analyzing temperature and heat transfer mechanisms at a heavy water plant. Fitzroy would remain with the General Electric company for the next 37 years.

Fitzroy specialized as a heat transfer engineer with the Advanced Technology Laboratories beginning in 1963. In 1965 she was a heat transfer consultant with the Research and Development Center, working on gas turbines, space satellites and other technologies. She applied thermal design expertise to an icing detection system for J-79 aircraft engine inlets and provided solutions for keeping the delicate electronic equipment in space satellites at room temperature while the skin of the satellite was being alternately super-heated and super-cooled.

Fitzroy's work reflects the interdisciplinary nature of engineering, as she can be considered both a chemical and a mechanical engineer. She was editor of the GE heat transfer and fluid flow data books for twenty years, a reference work that was made available by subscription to engineers world-wide beginning in 1970. Much of the book’s subject matter was not covered in conventional textbooks, resulting in these books becoming widely used technical resources with frequent supplements of additional information.

During the 1970s, Fitzroy turned to administrative and management roles. She was named manager for heat transfer consulting in 1971, a strategic planner from 1974 to 1976, then an advanced concepts planner and proposal manager up to 1979. During 1979–1982 she was a manager of energy and environmental programs with GE's Turbine Market and Projects Division. Thenceforth she worked as a consultant involved with gas turbines, nuclear energy, and space vehicles. She retired in 1987.

== Patents ==
- Hardened Antenna Element Cover US Patent No. 3,896,450
- Male Plug Assembly Incorporating Power Supply US Patent No. 3,880,491

== Organizations ==
Fitzroy was elected as president of the American Society of Mechanical Engineers (ASME) in June 1986. She was the first woman to head a major national engineering society. She had served as chairwoman of the Hudson-Mohawk Section of ASME in 1963, was elected to the ASME Board of Governors in 1983, and had held many other local and regional roles leading up to her Presidency.

Fitzroy was equally involved within the Society of Women Engineers as chairwoman of the 1973 Henniker III Career Guidance Conference, chairing the Nominating Committee, the Achievement Award Committee and serving on the Executive Committee.

Fitzroy was also a member of the American Institute of Chemical Engineers (AIChE) and an affiliate member of the National Society of Professional Engineers (NSPE). She served on the Board of Governors of the American Association of Engineering Societies (AAES).

Fitzroy served on National Advisory Boards. She was named to the National Science Foundation Advisory Committee for Engineering in 1972 and subsequently served on the NSF Advisory Committee for Research. She was also on the Board of Engineering Manpower in Educational Policy of the National Research Council.

== Awards and honors ==
- Achievement Award, Society of Women Engineers (1972)
- Demers Medal, Rensselaer Polytechnic Institute (1975)
- Davies Medal, Rensselaer Polytechnic Institute (2014)
- Fellow, American Society of Mechanical Engineers (1979)
- GE Power Systems Sector Engineering Award (1979)
- Centennial Medal, American Society of Mechanical Engineers (1980)
- Federation of Professional Women Award (1984)
- Honorary Fellow, Institution of Mechanical Engineers (1987)
- Elected to the National Academy of Engineering (1996)
- Rensselaer Alumni Association Distinguished Service Award (1996)
- Rensselaer Polytechnic Institute Hall of Fame (1999)
- Honorary Membership Award, American Society of Mechanical Engineers (2008)
- Honorary Doctorate in Engineering, Rensselaer Polytechnic Institute (1990)
- Honorary Doctor of Science Degree, New Jersey Institute of Technology

== Legacy ==
Fitzroy is recognized as the first chemical engineering woman graduate at Rensselaer Polytechnic Institute. In 1986, she was the first woman to be elected national president of the American Society of Mechanical Engineers.

Fitzroy was inducted into the National Academy of Engineering in 1996, contributing to the image of women as engineers through career encouragement to women pursuing engineering. She was recognized by the Society of Women Engineers with the 1972 Achievement Award.

Fitzroy’s technical legacy was her breadth of work in heat transfer at General Electric (GE), as well as her role as principal author and editor of the GE Heat Transfer and Fluid Flow Data books for 20 years. These books became technical resources for future engineers at GE and in the industry.

The Nancy DeLoye Fitzroy and Roland V. Fitzroy Medal was established in 2011 by the American Society of Mechanical Engineers to recognize "pioneering contribution to the frontiers of engineering leading to a breakthrough(s) in existing technology or leading to new applications or new areas of engineering endeavor". Fitzroy served as chair for the committee that selects the recipients.

Union College dedicated the DeLoye-Fitzroy House in 2006 in tribute to Nancy and her husband, Roland (Union College, Class of 1943). Rensselaer Polytechnic Institute renamed their Admissions building in 2019 to the Nancy DeLoye Fitzroy, '49 and Roland V. Fitzroy, Jr. Admissions Building.

Fitzroy served in engineering society roles at the local, regional and national level. She worked to broaden the pool of technological talent by initiating new programs to increase the participation of women and minorities in engineering.

== Personal life ==
Fitzroy was a Rensselaer Polytechnic Institute student when she met her husband-to-be, Roland Victor Fitzroy, Jr.. They were married in 1951.

Fitzroy owned and piloted a twin engine Cessna. She is one of the first licensed female helicopter pilots, and both she and her husband enjoyed flying, sailing and traveling. Throughout her life, Fitzroy was a member of the Whirly-Girls, an International Association of Women Helicopter Pilots and the Ninety-Nines, the International Organization of Women Pilots.

Fitzroy died in Schenectady, New York, on January 15, 2024, at the age of 96.

== Bibliography ==
- GE heat transfer and fluid flow data books (1955–1974)
- Career guidance for women entering engineering (1973)

== Additional reading ==
Teig, Holly (2025). Chapter 27 "Nancy D. Fitzroy". In Craig, Cecilia; Teig, Holly; Kimberling, Debra; Williams, Janet; Tietjen, Jill; Johnson, Vicki (eds.). Women Engineering Legends 1952-1976: Society of Women Engineers Achievement Award Recipients. Springer Cham. ISBN 978-3-032-00223-5
