= Jacqueline Chen =

American applied mathematician and mechanical engineer

Jacqueline H. Chen is an American mechanical engineer. She works in the Combustion Research Facility of Sandia National Laboratories, where she is a Senior Scientist. Her research applies massively parallel computing to the simulation of turbulent combustion.

== Education and career ==
Chen grew up as a child of Chinese immigrants in Ohio, and graduated from the Ohio State University with a bachelor's degree in mechanical engineering in 1981. After earning a master's degree in mechanical engineering in 1982 at the University of California, Berkeley, under the mentorship of Boris Rubinsky, she continued at Stanford University for doctoral study in the same subject. She completed her Ph.D. in 1989; her doctoral advisor at Stanford was Brian J. Cantwell.

She has worked at Sandia since finishing her education and is a pioneer of massively parallel direct numerical simulation of turbulent combustion with complex chemistry. She has led teams of computer scientists, applied mathematicians and computational engineers on the co-design of combustion simulation software for exascale computing (10^18 flops).

== Recognition ==
In 2018, Chen was elected to the National Academy of Engineering "for contributions to the computational simulation of turbulent reacting flows with complex chemistry". In the same year, the Society of Women Engineers gave her an Achievement Award, their top honor, and the Combustion Institute awarded her the Bernard Lewis Gold Medal, "for her exceptional skill in linking high performance computing and combustion research to deliver fundamental insights into turbulence-chemistry interactions". The Combustion Institute and the American Physical Society also named her as one of its fellows.
