= Lois Cooper =

American transportation engineer (1931–2014)

- Born: 25 November 1931; Vicksburg, Mississippi, United States
- Died: 26 January 2014 (aged 82)
- Education: Los Angeles City College, Los Angeles State College, University of Southern California
- Occupation: Engineer
- Engineering career
- Employer: Caltrans

Lois Louise Cooper (November 25, 1931 – January 26, 2014) was a transportation engineer and the second woman and first African American woman to pass the professional engineers license exam in California. During her career at Caltrans, Cooper worked on major highway infrastructure projects across California as well as early Carpool lanes and bikeways.

== Early life and education ==
Cooper was the first in her family to graduate from high school, and upon graduating she started a law degree at Tougaloo College. She may have left for a number of reasons, to be closer to her mother, for financial reasons or because she wanted to change to study mathematics.

In California she joined Los Angeles City College, and changed to studying mathematics and later studied at Los Angeles State College. During her degree study she was often the only Black woman in the class. She graduated in 1954, but continued her engineering studies at University of Southern California alongside her work.

== Career ==
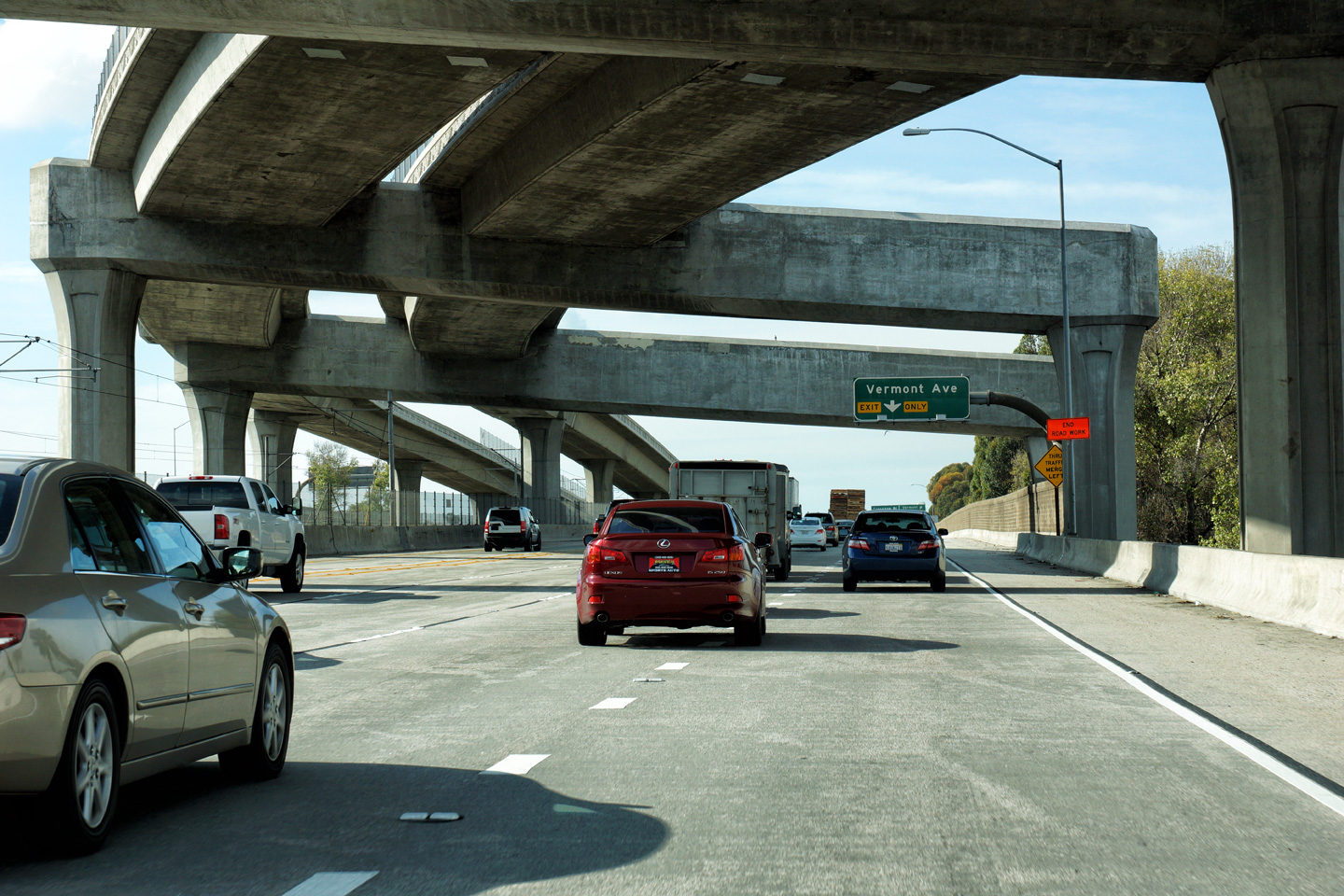
Westbound view along I-105 heading towards Vermont Ave, through the I-110 interchange with Carpool Flyover ramps above

Before completing her degree in Mathematics, Cooper first applied for a role at the California Department of Architecture but was rejected once the interviewer met her and realised she was a woman.

In 1953, Cooper was hired as an Engineering Aide by the Engineering Department at the California Department of Transportation or Caltrans, and was the first African American woman to be hired there. Much of her early role was calculating the alignment for highway infrastructure projects such as the Century Freeway, the San Diego Freeway, the Long Beach Freeway, the San Gabriel River Freeway, and the Riverside Freeway. Many of the Interstate Highway construction projects at the time were being built through predominantly Black and low-income neighbourhoods. The Civil Rights Division at Caltrans, of which Cooper was a part, ensured that projects were mandated to hire minority construction workers from these communities.

She was a skilled mathematician, who was often called upon to help her white, male engineer colleagues, to fix mistakes and solve problems.

Cooper was the second woman and first black woman pass the Professional Engineers License Exam in California, doing so on her first attempt.

Later in her career she was the first female director of the First Diamond Lane, a programme which delivered the pre-cursors to Carpool Lanes. She was also involved in the design of the first bikeway.

She retired in 1991 but continued mentoring and teaching young engineers into her retirement.

Cooper died in 2014.

== Memberships and legacy ==
In the 1970s Cooper was the first woman to join the Los Angeles Council of Black Professional Engineers (LACBPE) and participated in outreach programmes such as the Engineering Orientation Class Project (EOCP). She became their first woman president serving 1975-1976.

Cooper was also a Fellow of the Society of Women Engineers.

There are a number of scholarships and awards named in Cooper's honor:

- WTS-LA Lois Cooper Going the Distance Award
- Lois Cooper Scholars program at the University of Wisconsin
