= Joy Lim Arthur =

Electronic Engineer

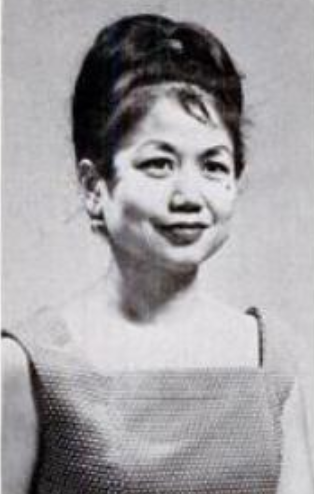
- Joy Lim Arthur, from a 1975 publication of the United States Army
- Born: December 2, 1935; Manila, Philippines
- Died: July 9, 2015 (aged 79); Las Cruces, New Mexico, U.S.
- Education: Purdue University; New Mexico State University
- Employer: White Sands Missile Range

Joy Lim Arthur (December 2, 1935 – July 9, 2015) was an electronic engineer at the United States Army Research Laboratory. In 1966 she was the first woman to graduate with a master's degree in engineering from the New Mexico State University. She was the first woman engineer to work for the White Sands Missile Range, and was a senior research engineer for United States Army from 1958 to 2005.

== Early life and education ==
Arthur was born in Manila. Her only brother died in childhood, which was a cause of great distress to her father Venacio Lim. He focused all of his ambitions on his younger daughter, educating her accordingly. She moved to the United States and studied electrical engineering at Purdue University, earning her bachelor's degree in engineering in 1956. At Purdue University, Arthur was one of two women in her 165-person engineering class. She returned to Manila after graduating, hoping to obtain her father's blessing to marry an American engineer. Her father was concerned she would be seen as a pom pom girl, and Arthur returned to America as a technical scientist. She went on to become the first woman to earn a master's degree at New Mexico State University in 1966. She supported the Society of Women Engineers in establishing a chapter at New Mexico State University.

== Career ==
In 1958, Arthur became the first woman engineer to work at White Sands Missile Range. She transferred to the United States Army Research Laboratory in 1962, where she began to protect the United States Army in their vulnerabilities to electronic warfare. She concentrated on increasing the number of soldiers who survived on the battlefield and improving the resilience of the United States Army to various threats. She designed protective sensors that could be used to protect the human eye from frequency-agile laser threats. She developed technologies that could jam signals, including a multi-spectral jammer that could detonate inert gases. In 1975 she was the only woman to win a United States Army Research Laboratory R&D Achievement Award. She won the award for her contributions to electronic warfare, particularly for studying unconventional and conventional chaff. She described the materials required for more effective chaff. She was inducted into the White Sands Missile Range Hall of Fame in 2005.

== Personal life ==
Joy Lim Arthur and her husband, Paul Arthur, established a scholarship for American women engineers at New Mexico State University. Arthur had two children, Gregory Venancio Arthur and Lia Frieda Brodnax.

== Death ==
Joy Lim Arthur died on July 9, 2015, aged 79, following a long struggle with Parkinson's disease.

=== Awards ===
- 1974: Certificate of Merit from the Association of Old Crows
- 1974: Samuel Stiber Award for Technical Excellence in Electronic Warfare
- 1975: U.S. Army Research and Development Achievement Award
- 1996: NMSU Distinguished Engineering Alumnus
- 2005: White Sands Missile Range Hall of Fame
