= Priti Wanjara =

Canadian metallurgist

Priti Wanjara is an Indian-Canadian metallurgist and an expert on welding and additive manufacturing. She is a principal researcher for the National Research Council of Canada, and head of metal manufacturing at the National Research Council's Aerospace Research Centre.

== Early life and education ==
At the age of five, Wanjara moved with her family at age five from Mumbai, where she was born, to Montreal. She has a 1993 bachelor's degree in materials engineering from McGill University. She continued at McGill for a Ph.D. in metallurgical engineering, completed in 1998.

== Career ==
She has been at the National Research Council Aerospace Research Centre since 2002, and was named as a principal research officer there in 2020. She also holds an adjunct faculty affiliation at McGill University.

== Recognitions, honors and awards ==
Wanjara is a Fellow of the Canadian Aeronautics and Space Institute, of the Canadian Institute of Mining, Metallurgy and Petroleum (CIM), of the Canadian Welding Bureau, of ASM International, and of the Canadian Academy of Engineering. She is a distinguished lecturer of CIM for 2024–2025.

She has received the following awards:

- 2009 Brimacombe Award of the Metallurgy and Materials Society of CIM,
- 2011 Silver Medal Award of ASM International,
- 2012 Queen Elizabeth II Diamond Jubilee Medal of the government of Canada.
- 2015 Research Excellence Award of the CIM Metallurgical Society.
- 2025 Society of Women Engineers Achievement Award for "landmark achievements in materials manufacturing and sustainability; for promoting and setting new standards for research excellence; and for transformational, global collaborations with academia and industry.
