= Miriam Gerla =

American mechanical engineer and management consultant (1919–1993)

Miriam "Mickey" Kleeger Gerla (15 June 1919 – 11 January 1993) was an American mechanical engineer and management consultant who served as the fifth president of the Society of Women Engineers. She is credited with an effective reorganisation to ensure the survival of the young organisation.

== Education and career ==
Miriam Kleeger was born on 15 June 1919, and held an office job after graduating from Bay Ridge High School in Brooklyn. In 1939, she married mechanical engineer Morton Gerla, and took his surname. He encouraged her to return to her studies. She became a student at the University of Maryland, College Park, where she graduated in 1944 with a bachelor's degree in mechanical engineering (with "aeronautical option").

From 1944 to 1953 she worked as an engineer on equipment for the US Navy, machinery for factories, and electrical power systems. From 1954 until 1960, she worked as a management consultant.

== Society of Women Engineers service ==
Gerla was a founding member of the Society of Women Engineers (SWE), chaired the New York Section of the SWE from 1949 to 1951 (through the official founding of the SWE in 1950), and remained active afterwards in various service roles of the SWE, including membership in the board of directors and a vice presidency.

In October 1956, while serving again as a member of the SWE's board of directors, she was called up to return to the vice president role on the death of the former vice president, Dorothea "Dotti" Perry. Then, in November 1956, president Lois Graham resigned, citing disagreements with the board and the pressure of her ongoing doctoral studies. Gerla was called again to step in, finished out the term, and continued as president for a second term ending in June 1958. She managed a particularly difficult phase of the organisation and is credited with ensuring its survival. Her tenure as presidency was marked by an increase in membership to approximately 650 members, a transition from an all-volunteer organization to hiring professional secretarial assistance, and a major revision of the organization's bylaws.

== Personal life ==
Miriam Kleeger married Morton Gerla in 1939. In 1960, they adopted a preteen son and Gerla retired to devote herself to his care.

Miriam Gerla died in 1993.
