= Yıldız Bayazıtoğlu =

Turkish-American mechanical engineer

- Education: Middle East Technical University; University of Michigan
- Engineering career
- Discipline: Mechanical engineering
- Institutions: Middle East Technical University; Rice University

Yıldız Bayazıtoğlu is a Turkish-American mechanical engineer known for her research on heat transfer on scales ranging from the fuel tanks of the Space Shuttle to nanotechnology. She has also performed research on containerless processing, fuel cells and solar cells, molecular dynamics, microchannels, and targeted temperature management in medical treatment. She is Harry S. Cameron Chair in Mechanical Engineering and professor of materials science and nanoengineering at Rice University.

== Education and career ==
Bayazıtoğlu graduated from Middle East Technical University in 1967. She went to the University of Michigan for graduate study, earning a master's degree in 1969 and completing her Ph.D. in 1974. She was the first woman to earn a doctorate in mechanical engineering from the University of Michigan.

After working as an assistant professor at Middle East Technical University from 1973 to 1974 and then as a visiting assistant professor at the University of Houston from 1975 to 1976, she joined the Rice University faculty in 1977.

With M. Necati Özışık, she is coauthor of the textbook Elements of Heat Transfer (McGraw-Hill, 1988).

== Recognition ==
Bayazıtoğlu is a Society of Women Engineers Distinguished Educator (1997), a Fellow of the American Society of Mechanical Engineers (elected 1992), an Honorary Member of the American Society of Mechanical Engineers (elected 2012), a Fellow of the American Association for the Advancement of Science (elected 2009), and an honorary member of the Turkish Academy of Sciences (elected 2014).

The American Society of Mechanical Engineers gave Bayazıtoğlu their Heat Transfer Memorial Award in 2004, and the Society of Women Engineers gave her an Achievement Award "for charting new territory for women in mechanical engineering and for creating novel solutions to both theoretical and practical problems in thermal science" in 2012.
