= Lisa C. Klein =

American engineer (born 1951)

Lisa C. Klein (born December 7, 1951) is an American engineer. She is a distinguished professor of engineering at Rutgers University in New Jersey. In 1977, she became the first female faculty member in the Rutgers School of Engineering. She is the director of the graduate program in the Department of Materials Science and Engineering.

== Biography ==
=== Early life and education ===
Klein was born in Wilmington, Delaware, on December 7, 1951. She earned a B.S. in metallurgy in 1973 and a Ph.D. in ceramics in 1976, both from the Massachusetts Institute of Technology.

=== Career ===
Klein was the first female faculty member in the Rutgers School of Engineering (1977) and the first female faculty member elevated to the professor II rank, equivalent to distinguished professor status (1993).

Klein has been a visiting scientist at Sandia National Laboratories in Albuquerque, New Mexico; University of Grenoble, France; and Hebrew University of Jerusalem. She has been an editor of the Journal of the American Ceramic Society since 1998. From 1993 to 2010, she served as co-editor of the Journal of Sol-Gel Science and Technology.

Klein served two terms as president of the Rutgers American Association of University Professors (AAUP) chapter. In this role, Klein was credited with conducting negotiations that lead to novel methods for expanding the number of tenure track faculty at Rutgers; these methods have been cited as potential models for faculty efforts to halt the attrition in numbers of tenure track faculty.

== Research ==
Klein's research focuses on the area of sol-gel science, a low-temperature process for making ceramic coatings. Her most important contribution to science has been the development of electrochromic window coatings that can be lightened or darkened through the use of a dimmer attached to a battery. This window coating is unique because it is manually controlled and can reflect the heat away, while still transmitting light in the summer or permit the solar heat in winter. This new development is more efficient than blinds, curtains, or tinted windows and can save on heating and cooling costs in the home or office.

== Awards and honors ==
- Distinguished New Engineer Award, Society of Women Engineers, 1984
- Fellow, American Ceramic Society, 1988
- Achievement Award, Society of Women Engineers, 1998
- Fellow, New York Academy of Sciences, 2001
- Elected member, World Academy of Ceramics, 2012
- Human Dignity Award, Rutgers University, 2015
