= University of Massachusetts Amherst Department of Food Science =

The Department of Food Science at the University of Massachusetts Amherst was officially started, preceding all other Food Science departments in the United States by over a year, on April 27, 1918. The formation of the department was conceptualized during World War I when problems with food shortages became a critical issue for the nation. The inspiration to develop the faculty of the Food Science Department began when Dr. Frank Waugh asked Walter Chenoweth to give a paper to a group of fruit growers. In the summer of 1913, Chenoweth set up a laboratory and so it began teaching and demonstrating food preservation.

== Walter Chenoweth ==
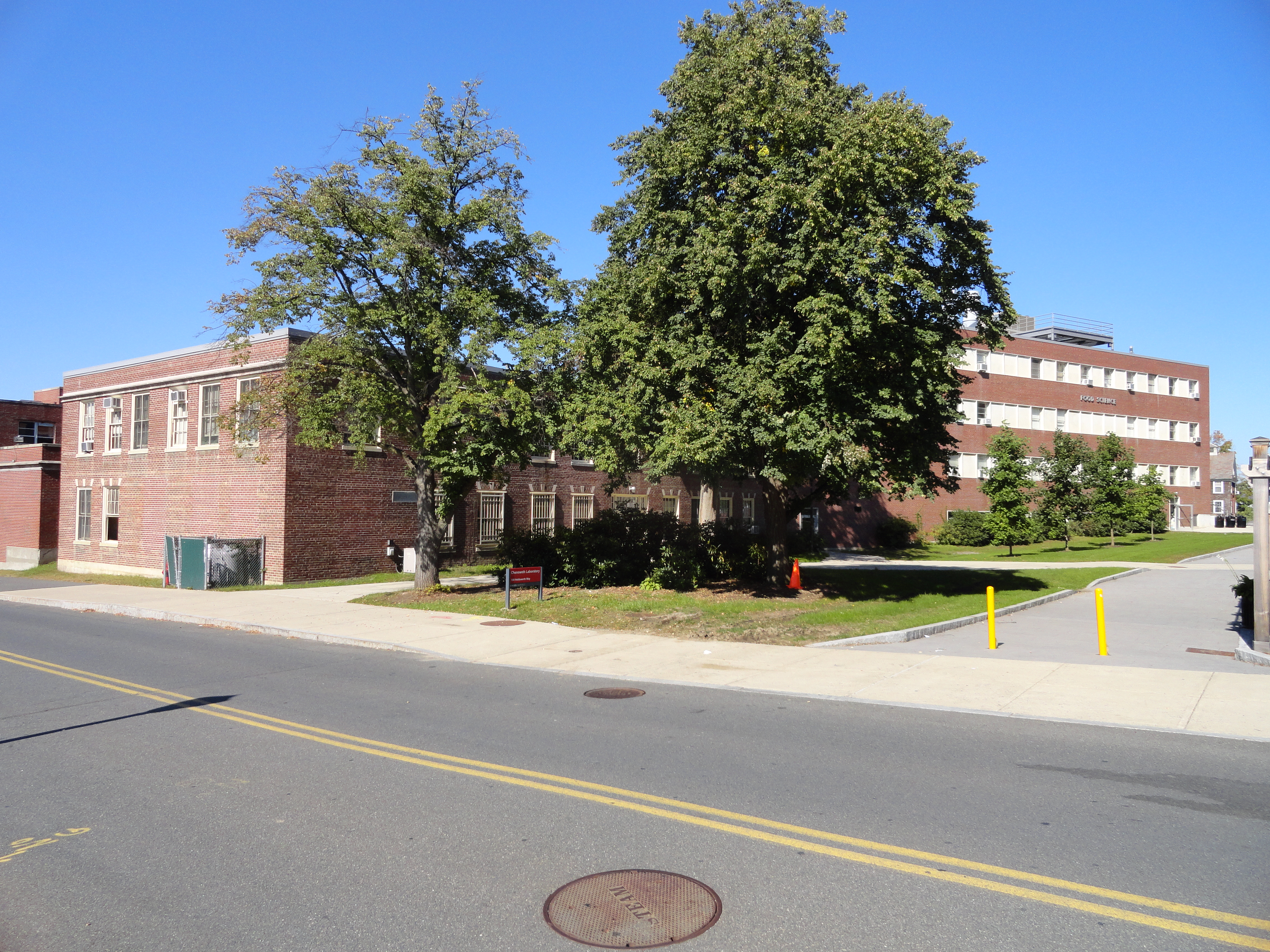
The Walter Chenoweth Laboratory

The new department established a very intensive campaign in community food preservation under the leadership of Walter Chenoweth. Dr. Chenoweth, along with three others, moved into what is now known as the “Old Chenoweth” in 1930. The original focus of the department was to teach students and homemakers the technology of food preservation. This included apple, grape, maple and vinegar products that were sold to the public in a store in South Amherst. During this time, Dr. Chenowth was quoted as being able to carry the entire library collection on Food Science under one arm. This led to Dr. Chenoweth publishing the first comprehensive textbook on Food Preservation.

== Carl Fellers ==
In 1941, Dr. Carl R. Fellers became department head. The department continued working on community food preservation projects such as canning foods for the dining hall during World War II. Under Dr. Fellers guidance the department shifted its focus from community research and education to the scientific age of industrialization of food manufacturing. This transformation could be seen as the Food Technology curriculum shifted and as classes such as “Homemade Tomato Products” were replaced by courses such as “Industrial Technology”. To reflect this change the department changed its name to the Department of Food Technology in 1944 as it expanded its interdisciplinary collaborations with faculty from Chemistry, Bacteriology, Dairy and Nutrition Departments.

Dr. Carl Fellers' research program had a breadth that is unheard of today as his program covered chemistry, microbiology, nutrition and engineering. He provided numerous technological advances for the Massachusetts food industry especially with the seafood and cranberry producers. For example, he patented a process for canning and freezing shellfish to prevent discoloration and the proliferation of gritty, glass-like struvite by controlling pH and binding minerals. This invention was credited by the U.S. shrimp packing industry to have “solved two of the most serious outstanding problems of the canned shrimp industry and constitutes the greatest technical advance in 25 years.”

Dr. Fellers also worked closely with cranberry growers in Massachusetts in an organization called “The Cranberry Exchange” to produce safe, nutritious and great tasting products. Dr. Fellers also collaborated with the National Canners Association to assist with food plant sanitation, prevention of food spoilage and development of federal regulation. Some other areas of research he participated in included innovative packaging technologies, color and flavor retention in preserved foods, methods for the fortification of foods with vitamins and determination of the nutritive value of foods. Dr. Fellers was not only an incredibly productive faculty member but he was also active in Military service. During WWII he was stationed in Australia and is accredited for establishing 33 dehydration plants that provided dried milk and egg products to the troops. For this he was awarded the Bronze Star. In 1987, Dr. Fellers felt that“The challenge is to provide the shoulders on which the future investigator will stand and from which he, in turn, will peer beyond the present horizons of knowledge into the great unknown. That is the spirit of research.”

Not only did Dr. Fellers have one of the top research programs in the world but he was also one of the founding fathers of food science. He was one of eight people to found the Institute of Food Technologists. While he was department head, he charged Dr. Guy Livingston with establishing the Food Science and Technology Honors Society, Phi Tau Sigma. Dr. Fellers loved working with students and was even known to personally support the University of Massachusetts degrees of underprivileged students from Amherst High School. IFT established the Carl R. Fellers Award to honor distinguished leaders in Food Science.

== William Esselen ==
Dr. William Esselen joined the department in the early 1940s during which time he assisted with the World War II effort by spending two weeks each month as a technical consultant for the War Food Administration. Dr. Esselen directed research on war time food substitutes, canning, and other food preservation methods. He then joined the Quartermaster Corps to assess post war Germany’s food production capabilities.

Dr. Esselen had a broad research program that focused on thermal processing, spore resistance, pickle technology, vitamin retention and packaging of cranberries. One of Esselen's most important scientific contributions was establishing the time-temperature relationships of vitamin destruction using the Arrhenius equation. This pioneering research established the basis for today's practice of utilizing high temperature-short time pasteurization to ensure food safety yet maximize nutrient retention.

During Dr. Esselen tenure the department experienced tremendous growth and national recognition. For example, faculty member Irving Fagerson began working with the Consumers Union to establish the nutritive value and quality of a number of processed foods such as frozen broccoli (a relatively unknown crop at that time), canned soups and frozen dinners which began the era of consumer education on the quality of processed foods. During this time the department was one of the top research leaders on campus. To put this in perspective, in the sixteen years from 1945 to 1960, the department of Food Technology graduated 75 of the 140 Ph.D.'s produced by the entire university. This boom of interest in the field of food science and technology ultimately led to the appropriation of $1,650,000 to construct Chenoweth Laboratory. The department's name was changed to Food Science and Technology in order to reflect the changes in the department itself and to recognize the importance of basic sciences to the food industry.

== Jack Francis ==
Following Dr. Esselen's tenure, Frederick Jack Francis became the head of the Department of Food Science. Dr. Francis had an array of research interests including food pigments and colorimetry, thermal processing, post-harvest physiology of fruits and vegetables and technical methods for increasing the food supply. Francis was a passionate individual and often wrote in support of food science and technology both in local and national publications. “We cannot feed tomorrow's population with yesterday's technology.” Francis was also quoted as saying, “Why is grain so important in world trade? Because it's nature’s way of preserving calories so we can eat them six months later. Well, that's essentially what processing and preservatives have done for the whole food supply. And I'm glad they have! Because I like to eat every day!” Francis was a realist and always approached ethical issues with a scientific light. ““An individual may choose to adopt the organic food way for his/her own ethical and moral reasons. They are entitled, and Americans can afford it. But let no one be under the illusion that we can feed the population with the organic movement.” Dr. Francis's insights over 40 year ago are still the topic of numerous popular press debates today.

Another example of Dr. Francis's amazing insights occurred upon working for Pfizer in the early 1960s. He was so impressed with their technology that he made a modest purchase in stock. Some 40 years later, he donated $1.5 million from this investment to establish the first endowed chair in the history of the University of Massachusetts Food Science Department.

== Herbert O. Hultin ==
Herbert O. Hultin joined the University of Massachusetts Food Science Department after obtaining his M.S. and Ph.D. degrees from MIT in three years. He spent half of his career in Amherst and the other half as the Director of the Marine Food Station in Gloucester, MA. His research included enzyme production of volatile flavors in fruits as well as protein and lipid biochemistry in fish products.

Dr. Hultin was considered the founding father of Food Biochemistry by many of his colleagues. He presented the inaugural Food Chemistry Division Lectureship titled “From the Chemistry of Foods to Food Chemistry.” There he emphasized how food chemistry should be taught by integrating past research and new developments. His vision was to use the basic sciences to expand the multidisciplinary nature of Food Science, a concept that is prevalent in Food Science research today.

Over the course of his life, Hultin received numerous awards. However, the one he was most proud of was the University of Wisconsin’s Professional Excellence Good Guy Award. This award offered recognition for a Professor that mentored numerous students with over 15 of his former graduates going onto successful careers as University professors. Herb Hultin’s legacy includes the Herbert Hultin Scholarship Award that is given annually to the top University of Massachusetts graduate student.

== Charles Stumbo ==
Dr. Charles Stumbo was one of the world’s top Thermobacteriologists. He conducted ground breaking research on methods to determine thermal processing times to ensure food safety. His book entitled “Thermobacteriology In Food Processing” contained process values for over 250,000 food processing operations. Dr. Stumbo also developed novel sterilization operations such as ethylene oxide and vapor phase sterilization. These techniques were used by NASA to sterilize space ships to avoid terrestrial organisms from contaminating extraterrestrial life. Dr. Stumbo's techniques decreased NASA's sterilization time from 23 hours to 90 seconds.

== Fergus Clydesdale ==
Dr. Fergus Clydesdale was one of the most successful teachers in the history of the University of Massachusetts. Along with Dr. Francis, they developed Food Science 101, “The Struggle for Food”. This class was the most popular courses of its time with over 1300 students per semester, reaching an estimated 15,000 during its time. His lectures were so popular that students attended the class and took the midterms even though many were not even enrolled.

Dr. Clydesdale also had a notable research career. He was one of the firsts scientists to integrate the fields of Food Science, Nutrition and Public Policy. He was one of the leading food industry consultants, providing advice for various projects such as one establishing the health benefits of whole grains. Dr. Clydesdale is currently the director of the University of Massachusetts Food Science Policy Alliance, the only such program in the U.S. He also gave his time to public service, working with the National Academy of Sciences, the Food and Drug Administration, the International Life Sciences Institute, and the Institute of Food Technologists. Dr. Clydesdale's efforts were recognized. He received numerous awards given by the IFT. Dr. Clydesdale's tenure as department head was one of the most successful in University of Massachusetts history. He formed the first departmental advisory board, which consisted of prominent alumni who had gained their early experience within the halls of Chenoweth. The Board and its two chairs, Charlie Feldberg and Noel Anderson, have worked tirelessly with Dr. Clydesdale to develop strong Alumni relations by establishing a semi-annual newsletter, an alumni weekend and an annual alumni breakfast at the IFT meeting. By establishing strong relations with alumni, the Board was able to take a leadership roles in helping the department raise over $4.5 million in endowments. These endowments have been instrumental in the success of the department, as they provide support for research, teaching and student scholarships In conjunction with the advisory board, Dr. Clydesdale also initiated the Strategic Research Alliance, a partnership with over 30 major multinational food companies. This alliance provides critical research funding that was used to establish one of the top scientifically equipped food science departments in the world. In turn, the Research Alliance provided the industry with research innovations and access to some of the best young food scientists in the world.
