= Robert V. Decareau =

American food scientist (1926–2009)

Robert Vincent Decareau (May 26, 1926 – January 18, 2009) was an American food scientist who was involved in the development of microwave applications in food technology, specifically technology that would lead to the development of the microwave oven. He also served in the United States Navy during World War II and in the United States Army during the Korean War. Decareau also was charter member of Phi Tau Sigma while pursuing his Ph.D. at the University of Massachusetts Amherst.

== Early life ==
Decareau was born in Cambridge, Massachusetts, but lived in the Arlington and Burlington areas. After graduating in 1943, he enlisted in the US Navy, serving aboard the USS Randolph aircraft carrier as an anti-aircraft gunner. While aboard the Randolph, Decareau survived two kamikaze attacks in early 1945.

=== Return home and back to service ===
After World War II, Decareau returned to Massachusetts, enrolling at the University of Massachusetts at Amherst. There, he earned two degrees in chemistry with his Bachelor's degree in 1949 and his Master's degree in 1951. After earning his master's degree, Decareau was commissioned as a First Lieutenant in the US Army during the Korean War, though he was stationed in Linz, Austria. While in Austria, Decareau met his wife; he would be married to the former Rosa Kaiser until his death.

=== Back to school and Phi Tau Sigma ===
After his discharge from the US Army, Decareau returned to the University of Massachusetts Amherst to pursue his Ph.D. in chemistry. Decareau also became a charter member of Phi Tau Sigma.

== Industrial career ==
After earning his Ph.D. in 1955, Decareau worked for Raytheon in Allston on microwave technology that would lead to the development of the microwave oven. Decareau's wife, Rosa, commented that a lot of work on the microwave oven was done at their home. Then at Lipton, he was involved in freeze drying. In the 1960s, Decareau moved to Palo Alto, California to work with Litton Industries. While at Litton, he developed microwave ovens that would be the foundation of commercial versions. Decareau moved back to Natick, Massachusetts later in his career to work in research and development at the United States Army Soldier Systems Center to develop food processing techniques for military and space exploration applications. His work would earn him Fellowship of the Institute of Food Technologists in 1994. During his career, Decareau was one of the first people to refer to himself as a food scientist.

=== Microwave consulting and support ===
Decareau authored nine books on microwave power, including Microwave Processing and Engineering and Microwaves in the Food Processing Industry. A founder of the International Microwave Power Institute (IMPI), he also served as editor of the Journal of Microwave Power and Electromagnetic Energy. Decareau also received a fellowship from IMPI. His colleagues at Natick would refer to him as "Mr. Microwave" for his numerous research studies in the field.

== Personal life ==
Decareau and Rosa had four daughters, two sons, seven grandchildren, one great-grandson, a niece, and a nephew. He was involved in his church in Milford, New Hampshire and enjoyed classical music, chess, and the Boston Red Sox. Decareau died in Nashua, New Hampshire of Alzheimers after fighting the disease for 17 years. The memorial service was held on January 22, 2009, in Milford.
