= Lois Graham =

American mechanical engineer (1925-2013)

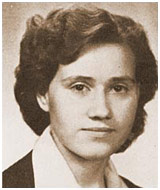
- Born: 1925; Troy, New York, US
- Died: 4 November 2013 (aged 88)
- Other name: Lois Graham McDowell
- Education: B.S.ME, RPI, 1946; M.S.ME, IIT, 1949; Ph.D.ME, IIT, 1959
- Awards: President (1955–1956) and Fellow Life Member, SWE; NSF-GRF, 1979; IIT Professional Achievement Award, 1980; IIT Julia Beveridge Award, 1991; IIT Person of the Millennium, 1999; RPI Hall of Fame, 2003; AAUW Named Scholarship Honoree, 2010–2011; Nominee, National Women's History Project National Women's History Month Honoree, 2013; IIT Lifetime Achievement Award, 2015; Fellow, ASHRAE
- Scientific career
- Fields: thermodynamics; cryogenics; combustion
- Institutions: Carrier Corporation; Illinois Institute of Technology

Lois Graham (known early in her career as Lois Graham McDowell or Lois G. McDowell) (1925 – November 4, 2013) was a professor of thermodynamics and cryogenics. She was the first woman to earn a mechanical engineering PhD in the United States.

Graham is remembered for her lifelong work recruiting young women into careers in science and engineering. She taught for nearly 40 years in the Illinois Institute of Technology's Mechanical, Materials and Aerospace Engineering program. Graham founded IIT's Women in Science and Engineering program, which recruited female high school students into science and engineering careers.

== Early life and education ==
Graham was born in 1925 and grew up in Troy, New York, one of three siblings. She initially wanted to be a doctor but could not afford medical school. An admirer of Amelia Earhart, Graham also wanted to be a pilot or flight attendant, but those professions at the time had height limitations of 5'3" and weight limitations of 125 pounds. "Well, unfortunately," Graham said in an interview, "I outgrew that career." Interested in aviation, Graham considered aerospace engineering, but as with medical school, she could not afford the tuition.

=== Rensselaer Polytechnic Institute ===
By the time she graduated from high school in the spring of 1942, Graham had settled on attending a state college for teachers in nearby Albany, NY. That summer, Rensselaer Polytechnic Institute (RPI), where Graham's father taught, announced that it would admit female students for the first time, and children of employees could attend for free. Graham enrolled, first attending summer classes, and then enrolling full-time, one of the first four women to be admitted. She followed an accelerated schedule that was available during World War II. Graham became one of the first two women to graduate with a degree at RPI (Class of 1946), and the first woman from the university to graduate with a degree in mechanical engineering.

=== Illinois Institute of Technology ===
After graduating from Rensselaer Polytechnic Institute, Graham worked as a test engineer at the Carrier Corporation, leaving after 18 months to pursue a master's degree. According to Graham, she was turned away by MIT (who requested "every single textbook I had used when I was in college and every portion of that textbook I had covered"), Caltech (who sent her a postcard stating, "We do not accept women"), and the University of Illinois (who told her, "we cannot accept out-of-state students at this time"), but was offered a teaching assistantship by the Illinois Institute of Technology (IIT).

I was at Carrier for a year and a half, and I think after about a year I was starting to get bored. I didn't feel I had enough responsibility. And so I talked to my immediate boss and told him that. And he said, "Well, you're too young." Too young? (Laughs) Well, I don't know whether that was the real reason or not, but in any case, I figured, all right, I'm going to go back to school and get older.

— Lois Graham, 2003 SWE interview

=== Degrees awarded ===
- Bachelor of Science, Mechanical Engineering (B.S.ME), Rensselaer Polytechnic Institute, 1946
- Master of Science, Mechanical Engineering (M.S.ME), Illinois Institute of Technology, 1949
- Doctor of Philosophy, Mechanical Engineering (Ph.D.ME), Illinois Institute of Technology, 1959

== Career ==
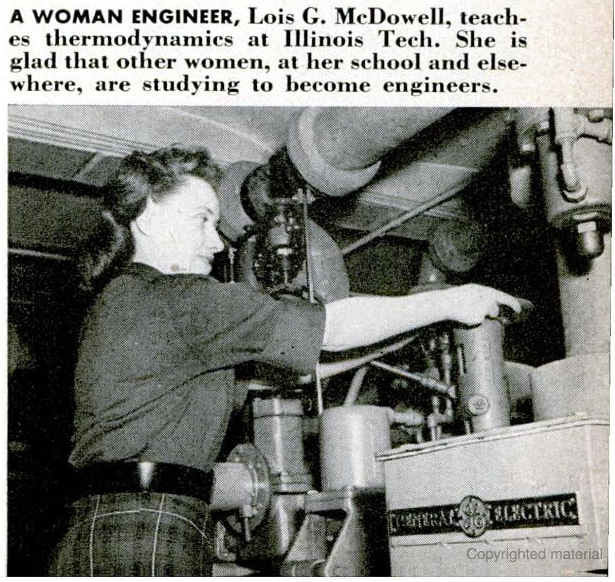
1953 photograph of Lois Graham in Popular Science

In 1949, Graham became the first female faculty member in IIT's engineering department, and the first female graduate student accepted into its Mechanical, Materials and Aerospace Engineering program. IIT had to make an adjustment upon her arrival: converting a small closet into a ladies restroom. Later that year, Graham earned a master's degree in mechanical engineering, the first woman at IIT to do so.

Even early in her career, Graham received attention for being a woman in a male-dominated field. In September 1953, Graham was featured in Popular Science, which ran a picture of her, identified as "Lois G. McDowell," with the caption:

A WOMAN ENGINEER, Lois G. McDowell, teaches thermodynamics at Illinois Tech. She is glad that other women, at her school and elsewhere, are studying to become engineers.

— Popular Science, September 1953

=== SWE and Women in Engineering ===
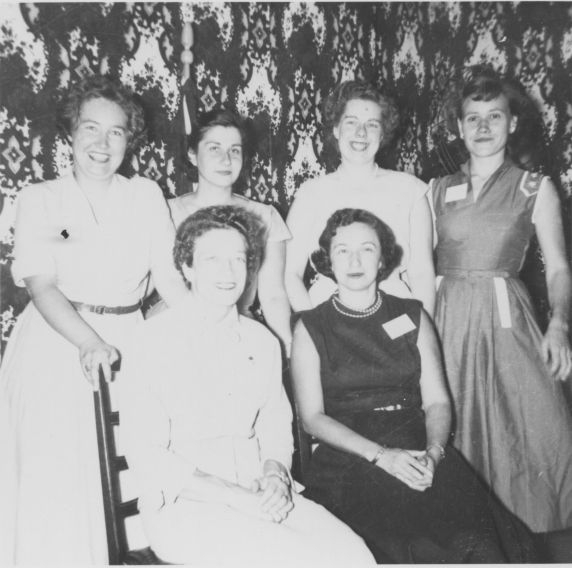
1953 Society of Women Engineers board meeting; Lois Graham is standing, on the right

Graham was a fellow life member of the Society of Women Engineers, which she joined in 1952, two years after it was founded. At SWE, Graham's work focused on increasing the number of women pursuing careers in engineering, science, and math. She wrote articles published by SWE advocating for improving the career counseling available to young women, and for increasing the recruitment of young women into the engineering field in order to end a shortage of engineers in the country. To bolster her arguments, Graham marshaled allies by citing other influential people from outside academia who had spoken favorably about women in engineering. For example, in one article, Graham employed a quote by Arthur Sherwood Flemming (then the Director of the Office of Defense Mobilization, and later US President Dwight D. Eisenhower's Secretary of Health, Education and Welfare), in which he said, "[W]e haven't got a chance in the world of taking care of that deficit of engineers... unless we get women headed in the direction of engineering schools." Graham argued that young women could not only help themselves, but also help their country, by pursuing careers in engineering.

Graham served as SWE's fourth national president from 1955 until 1956. In 1955, SWE released a 40-page report entitled Women in Engineering, aimed at influencing how female engineers were viewed by the public. Graham has said in an interview that an early title under consideration for the booklet was "Petticoats and Slide Rules." The report listed accredited engineering programs, their curricula and prerequisites. It also included information about scholarships for women, statistics about women in the engineering field, and suggested reading lists. SWE distributed the Women in Engineering booklet to over 400 high schools around the United States, as well as colleges and universities, corporations and government agencies, and engineering societies. Ultimately, the enthusiastic response led to SWE running out of copies of Women in Engineering, and a new edition was issued in 1958.

=== First woman in US to earn mechanical engineering PhD ===
In 1959, Graham was awarded a PhD by IIT and became the first US woman to earn a mechanical engineering PhD. Her doctoral work focused on the field of combustion, and her dissertation thesis was entitled Effect of adding a combustible to atmosphere and surrounding diffusion flame.

In 1974, Graham became assistant director for Engineering and Science. The following year, she was promoted to full professor, a rare rank for a woman to hold at the time. In 1977, she was named Program Director for IIT's Education and Experience in Engineering Program. She also served as the Director of IIT's Minorities in Engineering Program. In 1979, she was listed as a National Science Foundation Graduate Fellow. In 1980, she received the IIT Professional Achievement Award, and in 1991, the IIT Julia Beveridge Award.

=== IIT's Women in Science and Engineering (WISE) Program ===
In 1981, Graham founded IIT's Women in Science and Engineering (WISE) program. WISE employed women engineers in the private, public, and academic sectors, as well as graduate and undergraduate students, to engage directly with female high school students in order to increase enrollment of women into college engineering programs. WISE had a three-prong approach: encouraging high school girls in a supportive environment to pursue what are today termed STEM careers; engaging them in hands-on activities that expose them to various math- and science- related fields; and preparing them to pursue an undergraduate engineering degree by advising on course selection, college applications, and similar matters. Fall, winter, and summer programs were offered, usually free of charge, in which female high school students attended college lectures, networked with engineering students, faculty, and professionals, and participated in hands-on projects inside and outside of the laboratory, such as building a generator or planning a moon colony. WISE also educated parents, teachers, and counselors about the opportunities available to young women to pursue math and science careers.

== Retirement ==
After 39 years at IIT, Graham retired in 1985 and moved back to upstate New York. On December 8, 1999, Graham was awarded the Person of the Millennium award by IIT students, an award, Graham said, she "prized above all others."

On June 6, 2003, Graham was interviewed for SWE's Oral History Project. On September 19, 2003, Graham was inducted to the RPI Hall of Fame. Graham died on November 4, 2013, at the age of 88. An obituary in Watertown Daily Times wrote, "To her beloved grandchildren she was simply 'Grandma Lois.' But to thousands of female mechanical engineers in this country, she was a pioneer and role model."

In 2010–2011, Graham was an American Association of University Women named scholarship honoree. She was also nominated to be a National Women's History Project National Women's History Month honoree in 2013. In 2015, Graham was awarded a Lifetime Achievement Award by IIT.

== Impact and legacy ==
A 2007 article published in the International Journal of Mechanical Engineering Education entitled Outstanding Women in Mechanical Engineering described Graham as, "Recognised for her contributions as an educator to thermodynamics and cryogenics." RPI has written that Graham's "academic and professional career paved the way for women and minority engineers." IIT has described her as a "pioneer in the field of mechanical engineering."

I think a woman can do anything if she wants to. I don't think she has to go into a 'softer' science. It's simply a question of wanting to use your brains on this type of problem.

— Lois Graham, 2003 SWE interview

A student of Graham's, Sherita Caesar, was awarded the 2014 Women in Technology Award by the Women in Cable Telecommunications (WICT), the Society of Cable Telecommunications Engineers (SCTE), and Cablefax. An IIT publication announcing the award stated that Caesar was "inspired" by Graham, who "encouraged Caesar to teach others and give to others in order to help her overcome her fear of presenting her master's thesis."

Graham has also been credited for her work at SWE and ASHRAE (where she was the first woman fellow) to improve career counseling available to young women, and for her recruitment of young women into science and engineering fields.

=== Awards, honors, and memberships ===
- Fellow Life Member and National President (1955–1956), Society of Women Engineers (SWE)
- National Science Foundation Graduate Fellow (1979)
- Illinois Institute of Technology (IIT) Professional Achievement Award (1980)
- IIT Julia Beveridge Award (1991)
- IIT Person of the Millennium (1999)
- Rensselaer Polytechnic Institute Hall of Fame (2003)
- American Association of University Women Named Scholarship Honoree (2010–2011)
- Nominee, National Women's History Project National Women's History Month Honoree (2013)
- IIT Lifetime Achievement Award (2015)
- First female Fellow, American Society of Heating, Refrigeration and Air-Conditioning Engineers (ASHRAE)
- Member, American Society of Mechanical Engineers (ASME)
- Member, American Society for Engineering Education (ASEE)
- Member, American Association of University Women (AAUW)
- Member, Phi Tau Sigma
- Member, Tau Beta Pi
- Member, Sigma Xi

=== Support for arts, education and nature conservation ===
Graham's obituary stated that she was a "supporter of the arts, education and nature conservation," and that in the late 1990s, Graham and her husband became charter members of The Wild Center in New York (a 2015 finalist for the National Medal for Museum and Library Service).

== Selected works ==
- McDowell, Lois G. (September 1953). "Professional Guidance and Education". Journal of the Society of Women Engineers. 4 (1): 2–5.
- Graham, Lois (1959). Effect of adding a combustible to atmosphere surrounding diffusion flame (Thesis). OCLC 45226021.
- Fejér, Andrew; Graham, Lois (1965). Undergraduate Research Participation in Engineering: Report. Allyn and Bacon. Archived from the original on 2018-11-21.
- Graham, L.; Stice, J. (1978-12-15). "Solar collector storage panel". American Society of Mechanical Engineers, Winter Annual Meeting, San Francisco, Calif., Dec. 10-15, 1978. p. 9. Bibcode:1978asme.meetS....G.
- Graham, Lois (June 1985). "A Woman Engineer's Recollection of College" (PDF). Perspectives on the Professions. Vol. 5, no. 1. Chicago, IL, USA: Center for the Study of Ethics in the Professions (CSEP), Illinois Institute of Technology (IIT). Archived (PDF) from the original on 2018-11-21.
