= Phi Tau Sigma =

International honor society for food science and technology

- ΦΤΣ
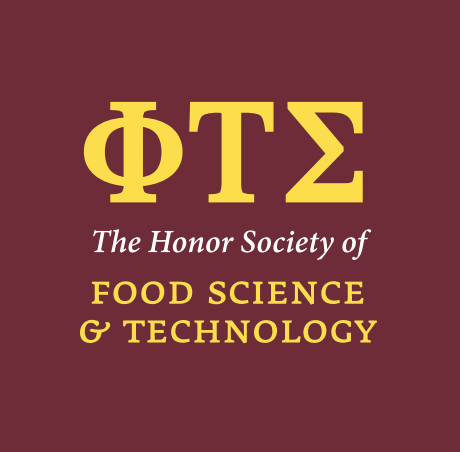
- Founded: 1953; 73 years ago University of Massachusetts Amherst
- Type: Honor
- Affiliation: Independent
- Status: Active
- Emphasis: Food sciences
- Scope: International
- Motto: "Devotion to the Study of Foods".
- Colors: Gold and Maroon
- Publication: The Newsletter
- Chapters: 41
- Members: 1,185 lifetime
- Headquarters: c/o Kantha Shelke, PhD; 33 West Ontario, Suite 57F; Chicago, Illinois 60654; United States
- Website: phitausigma.org

Phi Tau Sigma (ΦΤΣ) is an international honor society for food science and technology. It was founded in 1953 at the University of Massachusetts Amherst.

== History ==
The organization was founded in 1953 at the University of Massachusetts Amherst by Dr. Gideon E. (Guy) Livingston, a food technology professor. It was incorporated under the General Laws of the Commonwealth of Massachusetts December 8, 1953, as Phi Tau Sigma Honorary Society, Inc.

Besides Livingston, the charter members of the honor society were M. P. Baldorf, Robert V. Decareau, E. Felicotti, W. D. Powrie, M. A. Steinberg, and D. E. Westcott.

Phi Tau Sigma recognizes and honors the achievements of Food Scientists and Technologists, encourages the sharing of scientific knowledge, creates a network of professionals, and promotes charitable and educational programs.

In 2013, Phi Tau Sigma, for the first time, garnered the support and cooperation of the Council of Food Science Administrators. Phi Tau Sigma has 1185 members.

== Symbols ==
The Greek letters ΦΤΣ represent the Greek words for "Devotion to the Study of Foods".

- ΦΙΛΕΙΝ: Love or devotion
- ΤΡΟΦΗΣ: Food
- ΣΠΟΥΔΗΝ: Study

The society's colors are gold and maroon. its publication is The Newsletter.

== Activities ==
Phi Tau Sigma shares professional information through meetings, lectures, and publications.

Since 1984, the society has presented the Carl R. Fellers Award for service to the field of food science and technology. It also holds the annual ΦΤΣ Graduate Paper Competition and the Student Competition

The Phi Tau Sigma Student Achievement Scholarship is given to members for exceptional scholastic achievement and dedication to Phi Tau Sigma. Up to three awards may be made in a year. The Dr. Daryl B. Lund International Scholarship is given to a member to supplement international travel for educational purposes. The Dr. Gideon “Guy” Livingston Scholarship acknowledges a member's scholastic achievements and dedication to Phi Tau Sigma. The Phi Tau Sigma Founders’ Scholarship is given to a member whose graduate research has had or is expected to have, a significant impact.

== Membership ==
Members are elected as undergraduates, graduate students, or after graduation in recognition of their achievements and to facilitate their active participation in Phi Tau Sigma and the profession of food science and technology. Potential student members must have a Grade Point Average (GPA) equal to or greater than 3.5, or equivalent and must be pursuing a degree in food science of the equivalent.

Potential professional members should have a minimum of five years of work experience in food science and technology beyond a B.S. degree, four years beyond an M.S. degree, or 2 years beyond a PhD degree in industry, government, or an academic institution.

== Chapters ==
Following is a list of Phi Tau Sigma chapters.

Chapter	Charter date	Institution	Location	Status	Ref.
	1953	University of Massachusetts Amherst	Amherst, Massachusetts	Active	
	1954	Michigan State University	East Lansing, Michigan	Inactive	
	1955	Massachusetts Institute of Technology	Cambridge, Massachusetts	Inactive	
	1955	Rutgers University–New Brunswick	New Brunswick, New Jersey	Inactive	
	1956	University of Georgia	Athens, Georgia	Active	
	1956	University of Wisconsin–Madison	Madison, Wisconsin	Inactive	
	1957	Cornell University	Ithaca, New York	Inactive	
	1960	University of California, Davis	Davis, California	Inactive	
Buckeye	1964	Ohio State University	Columbus, Ohio	Active	
	1964	Virginia Tech	Blacksburg, Virginia	Active	
Hoosier	1966	Purdue University	West Lafayette, Indiana	Active	
	1968	Columbia University	New York City, New York	Inactive	
	1968	Pennsylvania State University	State College, Pennsylvania	Active	
	1968	Texas A&M University	College Station, Texas	Inactive	
	1969	Mississippi State University	Mississippi State, Mississippi	Inactive	
	1973	Louisiana State University	Baton Rouge, Louisiana	Inactive	
	1974	Mexico	Mexico	Inactive	
	1975	New York University	New York City, New York	Inactive	
	1976	Iowa State University	Ames, Iowa	Active	
	1977	University of Arkansas	Fayetteville, Arkansas	Active	
	1977	University of Nebraska–Lincoln	Lincoln, Nebraska	Active	
	1977	University of Rhode Island	Kingston, Rhode Island	Inactive	
	1977	University of Tennessee	Knoxville, Tennessee	Inactive	
	1981	University of Minnesota	Saint Paul, Minnesota	Active	
	1983	Alabama A&M University	Normal, Alabama	Inactive	
	1985	Kansas State University	Manhattan, Kansas	Inactive	
	1992	North Carolina State University	Raleigh, North Carolina	Active	
	1993	University of Missouri	Columbia, Missouri	Inactive	
	1994	University of Maine	Orono, Maine	Inactive	
	1997	California State Polytechnic University, Pomona	Pomona, California	Active	
Intermountain	1997	University of Idaho	Moscow, Idaho	Inactive	
	2003	University of Florida	Gainesville, Florida	Inactive	
	2003	University of Illinois Urbana-Champaign	Urbana, Illinois	Inactive	
	2003	University of Puerto Rico	Puerto Rico	Inactive	
	2006	Texas Woman's University	Denton, Texas	Inactive	
	2010	Chapman University	Orange, California	Inactive	
	2010	Shanghai Ocean University	Shanghai, China	Inactive	
	2010	Wayne State University	Detroit, Michigan	Inactive	
	2011	Clemson University	Clemson, South Carolina	Inactive	

== Governance ==
Phi Tau Sigma is a body with its own elected officers and is separate from the scientific professional organization, the Institute of Food Technologists (IFT). Over the years its relationship with IFT has varied, but currently, it has a mutual and respectful partnership with IFT in the following areas:

It has an Executive Committee made up of the president, president-elect, past president, treasurer, executive secretary, six at-large councilors (directors), and six alternate at-large councilors. It also has a Leadership Council (formerly known as Advisory Council) consisting of representatives of chapters.

== Notable members ==
- Rodolphe Barrangou, probiotics researcher
- Robert V. Decareau, food scientist who was involved in the development of microwave applications in food technology
- Carl R. Fellers, food scientist and microbiologist
- Lois Graham, mechanical engineer
- Gideon Livingston, food scientist and founder of Phi Tau Sigma
- John J. Powers, food scientist who was involved in the creation of the Food Science Department at University of Georgia
- Samuel Cate Prescott, food scientist and microbiologist
