= Carl R. Fellers Award =

Food technologies award

The Carl R. Fellers Award has been awarded every year since 1984. It is awarded to members of the Institute of Food Technologists (IFT) who are also members of Phi Tau Sigma, the honorary society of food science and technology, who have brought honor and recognition to food science through achievements in areas other than research, development, education, and technology transfer. The award is named after Carl R. Fellers, a food science professor who chaired the food technology department at the University of Massachusetts Amherst and when the first Phi Tau Sigma chapter was founded in 1953.

Award winners receive a plaque from IFT and a USD 3000 honorarium from Phi Tau Sigma.

== Winners ==
Year	Winner
1984	Emil M. Mrak
1985	Bernard S. Schweigert
1986	Edwin M. Foster
1987	Roy E. Morse
1988	Owen R. Fennema
1989	Frederick Jack Francis
1990	Richard L. Hall
1991	David R. Lineback
1992	Gilbert A. Leveille
1993	Gideon E. (Guy) Livingston
1994	John H. Litchfield
1995	Fergus M. Clydesdale
1996	Susan K. Harlander
1997	Paul F. Hopper
1998	Roy G. Arnold
1999	Manfred Kroger
2000	Dane T. Bernard
2001	Myron Solberg
2002	J. Ralph Blanchfield
2003	Daryl B. Lund
2004	Barbara O. Scheenman
2005	Philip E. Nelson
2006	Daniel Y.C. Fung
2007	Ken Lee
2008	Robert B. Gravani
2009	Kathryn L. Kotula
2010	Anthony Kotula
