= Advantium =

Cooking appliance brand

- Type: Private
- Industry: Kitchen tools
- Owner: General Electric
- Website: Official website

Advantium is the brand name of a line of fast-cooking combination microwave ovens for household use sold by General Electric. They use radiant heat from halogen lamps and microwave energy, either separately or together. The combination is claimed to cook and brown the outside of foods with radiant energy, and the inside with penetrating microwave energy.

Starting in 1998, the engineering team of Kevin Nolan, Dong Soo Shin, Todd Vincent Graves, Charles Smith, and Royce Hunt designed the original Advantium, which went on sale in 1999, used 240-volt AC power, and drew up to 25 amperes. It can generally substitute for a conventional oven, a cooktop, and a grill, and cooks between two and eight times as quickly as conventional cooking.

Early models had plastic grills, which were not durable, and tended to snap off from the heat that the noisy fan exhausted into the kitchen. Newer models had stainless steel grills.

The Advantium 120, released in 2001, cooks less quickly, but operates at 120 volts.

== See also ==
- Speed oven
- Trivection oven
