= International Microwave Power Institute =

The International Microwave Power Institute (IMPI) is an organization devoted to microwave energy and its usage. The organization has conducted surveys as well as educated the public to dispel microwave myths.

Founded in Canada in 1966, it is now headquartered in Mechanicsville, Virginia. It was initially created for industrial and scientific purposes, however in 1977, IMPI's purpose was expanded to deal with the evolution of microwave oven for the home.

The professional scientific journal of IMPI is the Journal of Microwave Power and Electromagnetic Energy.
