= Edwin Michael Foster =

American microbiologist

Edwin Michael Foster (January 1, 1917, Alba, Texas – February 11, 2013, Madison, Wisconsin) was an American microbiologist, specializing in food microbiology. He was the president of the American Society for Microbiology (ASM) in 1970.

== Biography ==
Foster grew up in poverty on a small cotton farm in East Texas. At North Texas State Teachers College (now named the University of North Texas), he graduated in 1936 with a bachelor's degree and in 1937 with a master's degree in biology. At the University of Wisconsin–Madison (UWM), he graduated in 1940 with a Ph.D. in agricultural bacteriology. His Ph.D. thesis The bacteriology of brick cheese during ripening. was supervised by William Carroll Frazier. From 1940 to 1941 Foster was an instructor in agricultural bacteriology at UMW. From 1941 to 1942 he worked as a bacteriologist in Texas. From 1942 to 1943, he was a first lieutenant in the U.S. Army Sanitation Corps. From 1943 to 1945 he was a U.S. Army captain in the Chemical Warfare Service (CWS). During his CWS service, he was stationed at Camp Detrick and worked on biowarfare. The 2007 PBS American Experience documentary The Living Weapon mentions his CWS service. In late 1945 he became an assistant professor of agricultural bacteriology at UWM. There he was promoted to associate professor in 1946 and full professor in 1952, retiring as professor emeritus in 1987. In 1966 he arranged for the Food Research Institute to move from the University of Chicago to UWM. He was the institute's director from 1966 to 1986 and expanded its size and scope. In 1975 the institute became its own department, named the Department of Food Micriobiology and Toxicoloy, at UWW. The new department was chaired by Foster from 1975 to 1986.

Foster did research on the bacteriology of cheese and the microbiology of several important subjects in food science: meat products, refrigerated foods, and the bovine rumen. He was a leading expert on the bacteriology and biochemistry of sodium nitrate in meat products. His research in the 1950s and 1960s on the bacteriology involved in vacuum-packaging and plastic-packaging of meat products enabled meat processors to greatly extend the shelf life of ready-to-eat meat products.

He was an internationally recognized expert on food microbiology. His directorship of the Food Research Institute established UWM as a world-class center of food research.

Foster was elected in 1964 a fellow of the American Association for the Advancement of Science. In 1982 he was the W. O. Atwater Memorial Lecturer.

In 1941 he married Winona Lively (1919–2006). They were parents of a son, Michael Stewart Foster.

== Selected publications ==
- Garey, John C.; Foster, Edwin M.; Frazier, William C. (1941). "The Bacteriology of Brick Cheese. I. Growth and Activity of Starter Bacteria during Manufacture". Journal of Dairy Science. 24 (12): 1015–1025. doi:10.3168/jds.S0022-0302(41)70226-2.
- Steinke, P. K. W.; Foster, E. M. (1951). "Effect of Different Artificial Casings on the Microbial Changes in Refrigerated Liver Sausage". Journal of Food Science. 16 (1–6): 289–293. doi:10.1111/j.1365-2621.1951.tb17382.x.
- Zorn, R.A.; Butzi, F.F.; Foster, E.M. (1952). "The bacteriology of sweet-curd brick cheese". Journal of Dairy Science. 35 (12): 1067–1075. doi:10.3168/jds.S0022-0302(52)93794-6.
- Kirsch, R. H.; Berry, F. E.; Baldwin, C. L.; Foster, E. M. (1952). "The Bacteriology of Refrigerated Ground Beef". Journal of Food Science. 17 (1–6): 495–503. doi:10.1111/j.1365-2621.1952.tb16795.x.
- Bauman, H. E.; Foster, E. M. (1956). "Characteristics of Organisms Isolated from the Rumen of Cows Fed High and Low Roughage Rations". Journal of Bacteriology. 71 (3): 333–338. doi:10.1128/jb.71.3.333-338.1956. PMC 357799. PMID 13306705.
- Allen, J. R.; Foster, E. M. (1960). "Spoilage of Vacuum-Packed Sliced Processed Meats During Refrigerated Storage". Journal of Food Science. 25: 19–25. doi:10.1111/j.1365-2621.1960.tb17931.x.
- Wegner, G. H.; Foster, E. M. (1963). "Incorporation of Isobutyrate and Valerate into Cellular Plasmalogen by Bacteroides succinogenes". Journal of Bacteriology. 85 (1): 53–61. doi:10.1128/jb.85.1.53-61.1963. PMC 278089. PMID 13999496.
- Christiansen, Lee N.; Foster, E. M. (1965). "Effect of Vacuum Packaging on Growth of Clostridium botulinum and Staphylococcus aureus in Cured Meats". Applied Microbiology. 13 (6): 1023–1025. doi:10.1128/am.13.6.1023-1025.1965. PMC 1058389. PMID 5325416.
- Bott, Thomas L.; Deffner, Janet S.; McCoy, Elizabeth; Foster, E. M. (1966). "Clostridium botulinum Type E in Fish from the Great Lakes". Journal of Bacteriology. 91 (3): 919–924. doi:10.1128/jb.91.3.919-924.1966. PMC 315978. PMID 5326102.
- Foster, E. M.; Sugiyama, H. (1966). "Latest Developments in Research on Botulism". Journal of Milk and Food Technology. 29 (11): 342–347. doi:10.4315/0022-2747-29.11.342. 1966
- Duncan, Charles L.; Foster, E. M. (1968). "Role of Curing Agents in the Preservation of Shelf-stable Canned Meat Products". Applied Microbiology. 16 (2): 401–405. doi:10.1128/am.16.2.401-405.1968. PMC 547417. PMID 5645422.
- Duncan, Charles L.; Foster, E. M. (1968). "Effect of Sodium Nitrite, Sodium Chloride, and Sodium Nitrate on Germination and Outgrowth of Anaerobic Spores". Applied Microbiology. 16 (2): 406–411. doi:10.1128/am.16.2.406-411.1968. PMC 547418. PMID 5645423.
- Duncan, Charles L.; Foster, E. M. (1968). "Nitrite-induced Germination of Putrefactive Anaerobe 3679h Spores". Applied Microbiology. 16 (2): 412–416. doi:10.1128/am.16.2.412-416.1968. PMC 547419. PMID 5645424.
- Christiansen, Lee N.; Deffner, Janet; Foster, E. M.; Sugiyama, H. (1968). "Survival and Outgrowth of Clostridium botulinum Type E Spores in Smoked Fish". Applied Microbiology. 16 (1): 133–137. doi:10.1128/am.16.1.133-137.1968. PMC 547331. PMID 4865899.
- Dack, Gail M.; Foster, E. M. (1969). "Botulinus Toxin". JAMA: The Journal of the American Medical Association. 210 (11): 2092. doi:10.1001/jama.1969.03160370076025.
- Foster, E. M. (1971). "The Control of Salmonellae in Processed Foods: A Classification System and Sampling Plan". Journal of AOAC International. 54 (2): 259–266. doi:10.1093/jaoac/54.2.259. PMID 5162617.
- Tanaka, N.; Traisman, E.; Lee, M. H.; Cassens, R. G.; Foster, E. M. (1980). "Inhibition of Botulinum Toxin Formation in Bacon by Acid Development". Journal of Food Protection. 43 (6): 450–457. doi:10.4315/0362-028X-43.6.450. PMID 30822950.
- Foster, E.M. (1982). "How Safe Are Our Foods?". Nutrition Reviews. 40: 28–34. doi:10.1111/j.1753-4887.1982.tb06833.x.
- Doyle, M. P.; Bains, N. J.; Schoeni, J. L.; Foster, E. M. (1982). "Fate of Salmonella typhimurium and Staphylococcus aureus in Meat Salads Prepared with Mayonnaise". Journal of Food Protection. 45 (2): 152–156. doi:10.4315/0362-028X-45.2.152. PMID 30866198.
- Pariza, M. W.; Foster, E. M. (1983). "Determining the Safety of Enzymes Used in Food Processing". Journal of Food Protection. 46 (5): 453–468. doi:10.4315/0362-028X-46.5.453. PMID 30913657.
