= Journal of Microwave Power and Electromagnetic Energy =

- Discipline: Microwave technology
- Language: English
- Edited by: Juan Antonio Aguilar-Garib

Publication details
- Former name: Journal of Microwave Power (1966-1985)
- History: 1966-present
- Publisher: International Microwave Power Institute; Taylor & Francis
- Frequency: Yearly
- Impact factor: 0.9 (2023)

Standard abbreviations
- ISO 4: J. Microw. Power Electromagn. Energy

Indexing
- CODEN: JLMPAB
- ISSN: 0832-7823
- LCCN: 2016201204
- OCLC no.: 1322869699

Links
- Journal homepage; Online access

The Journal of Microwave Power and Electromagnetic Energy is a quarterly peer-reviewed scientific journal covering industrial, medical, and scientific applications of electromagnetic and microwaves from 0.1 to 100 GHz, including topics such as food processing, instrumentation, polymer technologies, microwave chemistry and systems design.

The journal is published jointly by the International Microwave Power Institute and Taylor & Francis. Its editor-in-chief is Juan Antonio Aguilar-Garib (Autonomous University of Nuevo León).

== Abstracting and indexing ==
The journal is abstracted and indexed in:

- Current Contents/Engineering, Computing & Technology
- EBSCO databases
- Ei Compendex
- Food Science and Technology Abstracts
- Science Citation Index Expanded
- Scopus

According to the Journal Citation Reports, the journal has a 2023 impact factor of 0.9.
