= Guy Livingston =

American food scientist (1927–2000)

- Born: Guy E. Livingston; 1927; New York City, New York, US
- Died: January 1, 2000 (aged 72–73); Dobbs Ferry, New York, US
- Education: New York University, B.A. Chemistry University of Massachusetts Amherst, M.S. Food Technology University of Massachusetts Amherst, Ph.D. Food Technology
- Known for: Founder of Phi Tau Sigma

Gideon E. "Guy" Livingston (1927 – January 1, 2000) was an American food scientist who was responsible for founding Phi Tau Sigma at the University of Massachusetts Amherst. He was also well known in food safety for foodservice establishments and for refrigerated foods shelf-life studies. He was a fellow in the American Association for the Advancement of Science.

== Education ==
Livingston was a native of New York City, New York. He earned a B.A. in chemistry from New York University. He then earned an M.S. and Ph.D. in food technology at the University of Massachusetts Amherst (UMass) under Carl R. Fellers.

== Career ==
Livingston stayed at UMass as an associate professor from 1953 to 1956. While there, he was the faculty advisor for the first Phi Tau Sigma chapter in the United States. Phi Tau Sigma is the honorary society of food science and technology that has 39 chapters on university campuses in the United States and Latin America as of 2007.

Livingston left UMass in 1956 to found his consulting firm, Food Science Associates, in Dobbs Ferry, New York. During his consulting career, Livingston wrote about 100 research and technical articles, earned two American patents, and edited or co-authored four books.

In the 1960s, he was the manager of the Institutional Products Department of Morton Frozen Foods. He was a chemist at the Bureau of Chemistry at the New York Produce Exchange. He was also a visiting professor at Laval University in Canada.

He was a fellow in the American Association for the Advancement of Science.

== Contributions to food science ==
- Created the first ever symposium dealing with foodservice and food technology at the 1967 Institute of Food Technologists (IFT) Annual Meeting and Food Expo that would to the creation the Institute first division (Foodservice) two years later.
- Organized the Master's program in Food Science at Columbia University.
- Designed mass feeding programs for fast food restaurants, schools, hospitals, and airlines while as a consultant during the 1960s and 1970s.
- Worked as a consultant for the United States Army Soldier Systems Center in Natick, Massachusetts during the 1970s on numerous projects to improve foodservice operations for the American military.
- Led the proposal to ensure certification for foodservice managers on sanitation, which was later adopted by the United States Food and Drug Administration and numerous states and municipalities as well. This included the curriculum for New Jersey's foodservice sanitation certification program.
- Served as editor-In-chief of the Pioneers in Food Science series from 1993 until his 2000 death, including a book on Nicholas Appert, the father of food technology. The book series is being published by Food and Nutrition Press out of Trumbull, Connecticut though the Appert book has not been published as of 2007.
- Member of Association Internationale

== Awards ==
- IFT Fellow - 1979
- IFT Carl R. Fellers Award - 1993.

== Personal life ==
Livingston died on New Year's Day, 2000 in Dobbs Ferry, New York.
