= Carl R. Fellers =

American food scientist

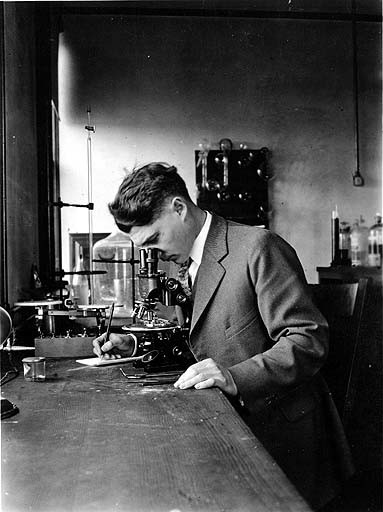
Carl R. Fellers, 1925

Carl R. Fellers (1893–1960) was an American food scientist and microbiologist who was involved in the pasteurization of dried foods and canning Atlantic blue crab.

== Early life and career ==
A native of Hastings, New York, Fellers worked in research for the United States Department of Agriculture, the National Canners Association (Food Products Association since 2005), and the University of Washington before joining the University of Massachusetts Amherst (known in 1925 as Massachusetts Agricultural College) department of horticulture manufacturing on December 1, 1925.

== Career at the University of Massachusetts ==
From 1925 to 1941, Fellers, current department head Walter Chenoweth, and two other professors worked to develop the research and teaching areas of the department.

Fellers' research during that time involved canning of blue crab, an article that was featured in a 1939 Time magazine article which greatly increased the quality and quantity of crab produced in the US for consumption.

Following Chenoweth's retirement in 1941, Fellers became department chair in 1941 and would serve in that position until his retirement in July 1957. During his tenure as department chair, the department would change its name to food technology, a name it would keep until 1962. It is now the department of food science, a name it has had since 1988. 75 of the 140 students who would earn Ph.D.s at the University of Massachusetts (known as Massachusetts State College from 1931 to 1947) would come from the food technology department.

Fellers as department chair also gave the go ahead to faculty member Gideon E. (Guy) Livingston to form an honor society for food science and technology which would be called Phi Tau Sigma (ΦΤΣ). Additionally, he also created a fisheries school and laboratory at the University of Massachusetts as well. Even during the 1950s, the food technology department did testing for Consumer Reports magazine, thanks to Fellers' negotiating with the Consumers Union, mainly focusing on their research to the nutritive values of frozen food and canned foods.

== Institute of Food Technologists ==
Fellers was a charter member of the Institute of Food Technologists (IFT), serving in the role of Secretary-Treasurer from 1947 to 1949 before Charles S. Lawrence took over the Executive Secretary position and moved the secretary role from Amherst, Massachusetts to its current location in Chicago, Illinois. Fellers served as IFT President from 1949 to 1950. He also received the Babcock-Hart Award, then the Stephen M. Babcock Award in 1950.

== Other activities ==
Fellers served as chairman of the American Chemical Society's "Agricultural and Food Chemistry Division" during the late 1930s and early 1940s. He also was a very competitive badminton player as noted by Roy E. Morse, a graduate student at the University of Massachusetts Amherst would later be elected to IFT President in 1987 - 1988.

== Death and legacy ==
Fellers died in 1960. In 1984, IFT presented the Phi Tau Sigma award in honor of a member of both the honor society and IFT who brought honor and recognition in food science through achievements in areas other than teaching, research, technology transfer, or development. The award changed to it current name, the Carl R. Fellers Award by 1987.
