= Microwave oven =

Kitchen cooking appliance

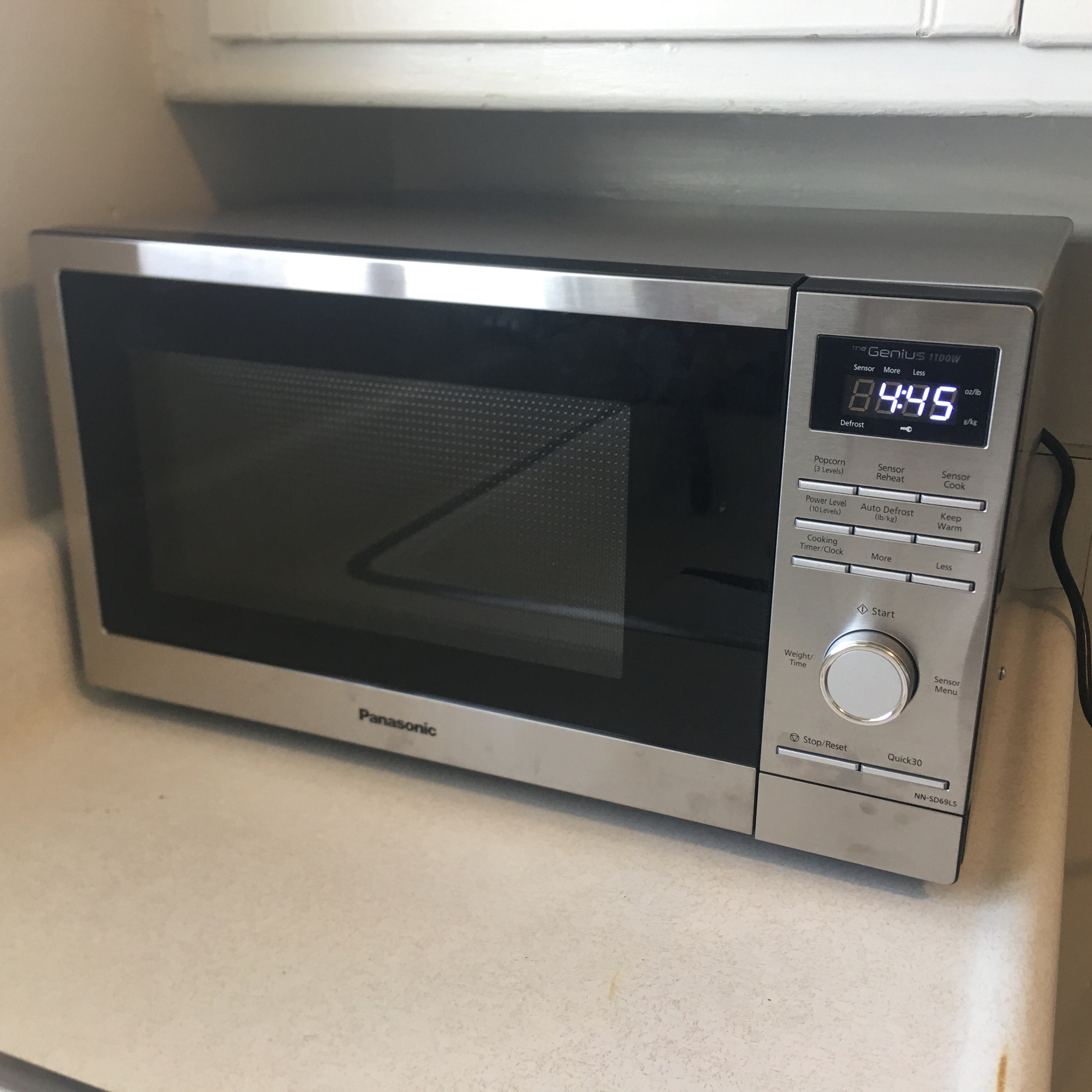
- A modern microwave oven (2022)
- Type: Appliance
- Inventor: Percy Spencer
- Inception: 1947; 79 years ago
- Manufacturer: Various
- Available: Globally

A microwave oven, or simply microwave, is an electric oven that heats and cooks food by exposing it to electromagnetic radiation in the microwave frequency range. This induces polar molecules in the food to rotate and produce thermal energy (heat) in a process known as dielectric heating. Microwave ovens heat food quickly and efficiently; the heating effect is fairly uniform in the outer 25–38 mm (1–1.5 inches) of a homogeneous, high-water-content food item.

The development of the cavity magnetron in the United Kingdom made possible the production of electromagnetic waves of a small enough wavelength (microwaves) to efficiently heat up water molecules. American electrical engineer Percy Spencer is generally credited with developing and patenting the world's first commercial microwave oven, the Raytheon "Radarange", which was first sold in 1947. He based it on British radar technology which had been developed before and during World War II.

Raytheon later licensed its patents for a home-use microwave oven that was first sold by Tappan in 1956, but it was still too large and expensive for general home use. Sharp Corporation introduced the first microwave oven with a turntable between 1964 and 1966; this feature created more even heating than the earlier microwave stirrer feature. The countertop microwave oven was introduced in 1967 by the Amana Corporation, which was, at the time, owned by Raytheon. After microwave ovens became affordable for residential use in the late 1970s, their use spread into residential kitchens around the world, and prices fell rapidly during the 1980s. In addition to cooking food, microwave ovens are used for heating in many industrial processes.

Microwave ovens are a common kitchen appliance in households and kitchens and are popular for reheating previously cooked foods and cooking a variety of different foods. They rapidly heat foods which can easily burn or turn lumpy if cooked rapidly in conventional pans, such as butter, fats, chocolate, or porridge. Microwave ovens usually do not directly brown or caramelize food, since they rarely attain the necessary temperature to produce Maillard reactions. Exceptions occur in cases where the oven is used to heat frying-oil and other oily items (such as bacon), which attain far higher temperatures than that of boiling water.

Microwave ovens have a limited role in professional cooking, because the boiling-range temperatures of a microwave oven do not produce the flavorful chemical reactions that frying, browning, or baking at a higher temperature produces. However, there are hybrid appliances that combine infrared radiation, hot air, and microwaves, such as convection microwave ovens.

== History ==
=== Early developments ===
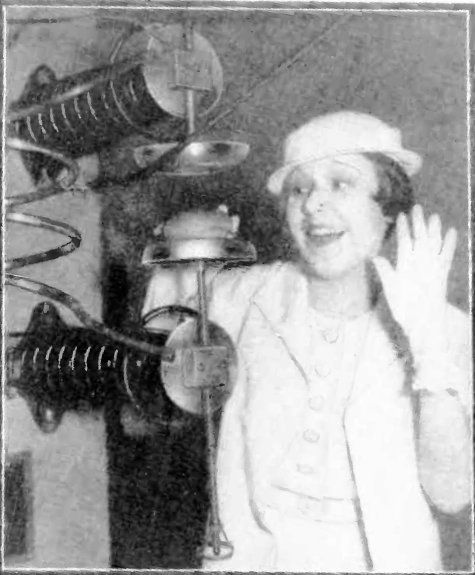
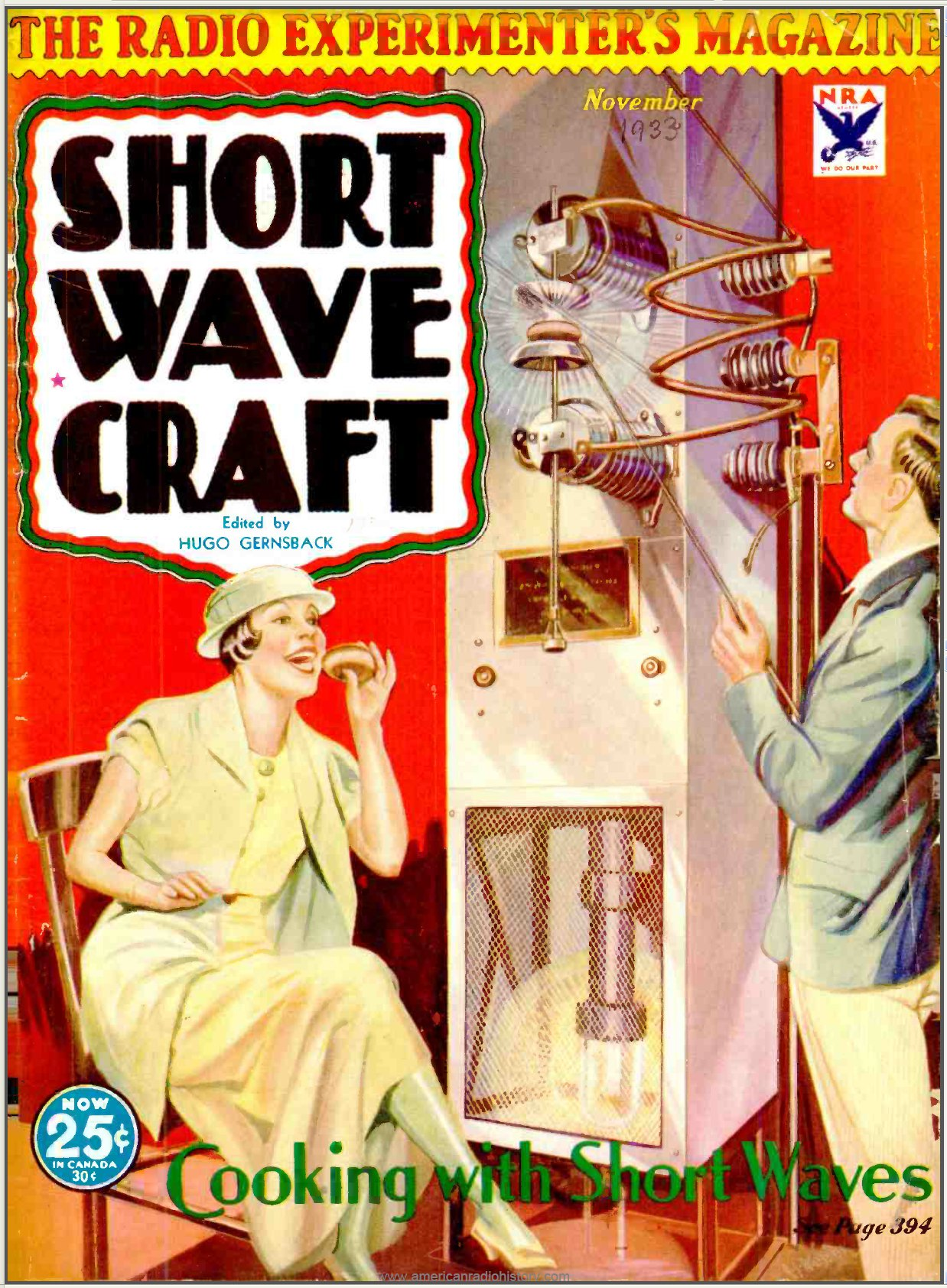
Demonstration by Westinghouse of cooking sandwiches with a 60 MHz shortwave radio transmitter at the 1933 Chicago World's Fair

The exploitation of high-frequency radio waves for heating substances was made possible by the development of vacuum tube radio transmitters around 1920. By 1930 the application of short waves to heat human tissue had developed into the medical therapy of diathermy. At the 1933 Chicago World's Fair, Westinghouse demonstrated the cooking of foods between two metal plates attached to a 10 kW, 60 MHz shortwave transmitter. The Westinghouse team, led by I. F. Mouromtseff, found that foods like steaks and potatoes could be cooked in minutes.

The 1937 United States patent application by Bell Laboratories states:

This invention relates to heating systems for dielectric materials and the object of the invention is to heat such materials uniformly and substantially simultaneously throughout their mass. ... It has been proposed therefore to heat such materials simultaneously throughout their mass by means of the dielectric loss produced in them when they are subjected to a high voltage, high frequency field.

However, lower-frequency dielectric heating, as described in the aforementioned patent, is (like induction heating) an electromagnetic heating effect, the result of the so-called near-field effects that exist in an electromagnetic cavity that is small compared with the wavelength of the electromagnetic field. This patent proposed radio frequency heating, at 10 to 20 megahertz (wavelength 30 to 15 meters, respectively). Heating from microwaves that have a wavelength that is small relative to the cavity (as in a modern microwave oven) is due to "far-field" effects that are due to classical electromagnetic radiation that describes freely propagating light and microwaves suitably far from their source. Nevertheless, the primary heating effect of all types of electromagnetic fields at both radio and microwave frequencies occurs via the dielectric heating effect, as polarized molecules are affected by a rapidly alternating electric field.

=== Cavity magnetron ===
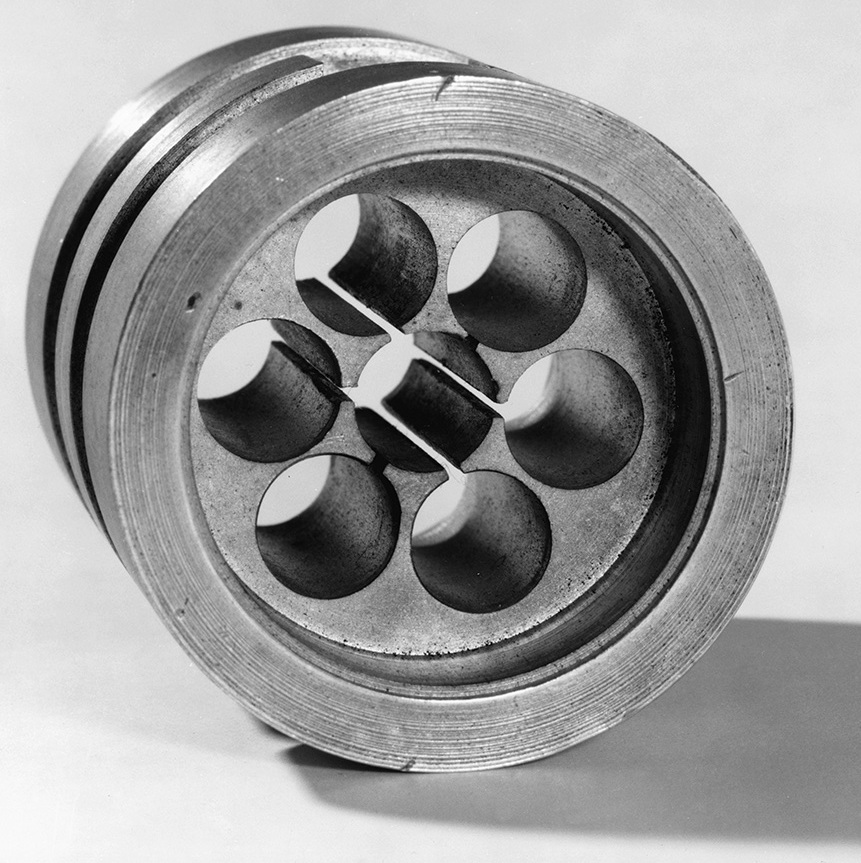
The cavity magnetron developed by John Randall and Harry Boot in 1940 at the University of Birmingham, England

The invention of the cavity magnetron made possible the production of electromagnetic waves of a small enough wavelength (microwaves). The cavity magnetron was a crucial component in the development of short wavelength radar during World War II. In 1937–1940, a multi-cavity magnetron was built by British physicist Sir John Turton Randall, FRSE and coworkers, for the British and American military radar installations in World War II. A higher-powered microwave generator that worked at shorter wavelengths was needed, and in 1940, at the University of Birmingham in England, Randall and Harry Boot produced a working prototype. They invented a valve that could produce pulses of microwave radio energy at a wavelength of 10 cm, an unprecedented discovery.

Sir Henry Tizard traveled to the US in late September 1940 to offer Britain's most valuable technical secrets including the cavity magnetron in exchange for US financial and industrial support (see Tizard Mission). An early 6 kW version, built in England by the General Electric Company Research Laboratories, Wembley, London, was given to the U.S. government in September 1940. The cavity magnetron was later described by American historian James Phinney Baxter III as "[t]he most valuable cargo ever brought to our shores". Contracts were awarded to Raytheon and other companies for the mass production of the cavity magnetron.

=== Discovery ===
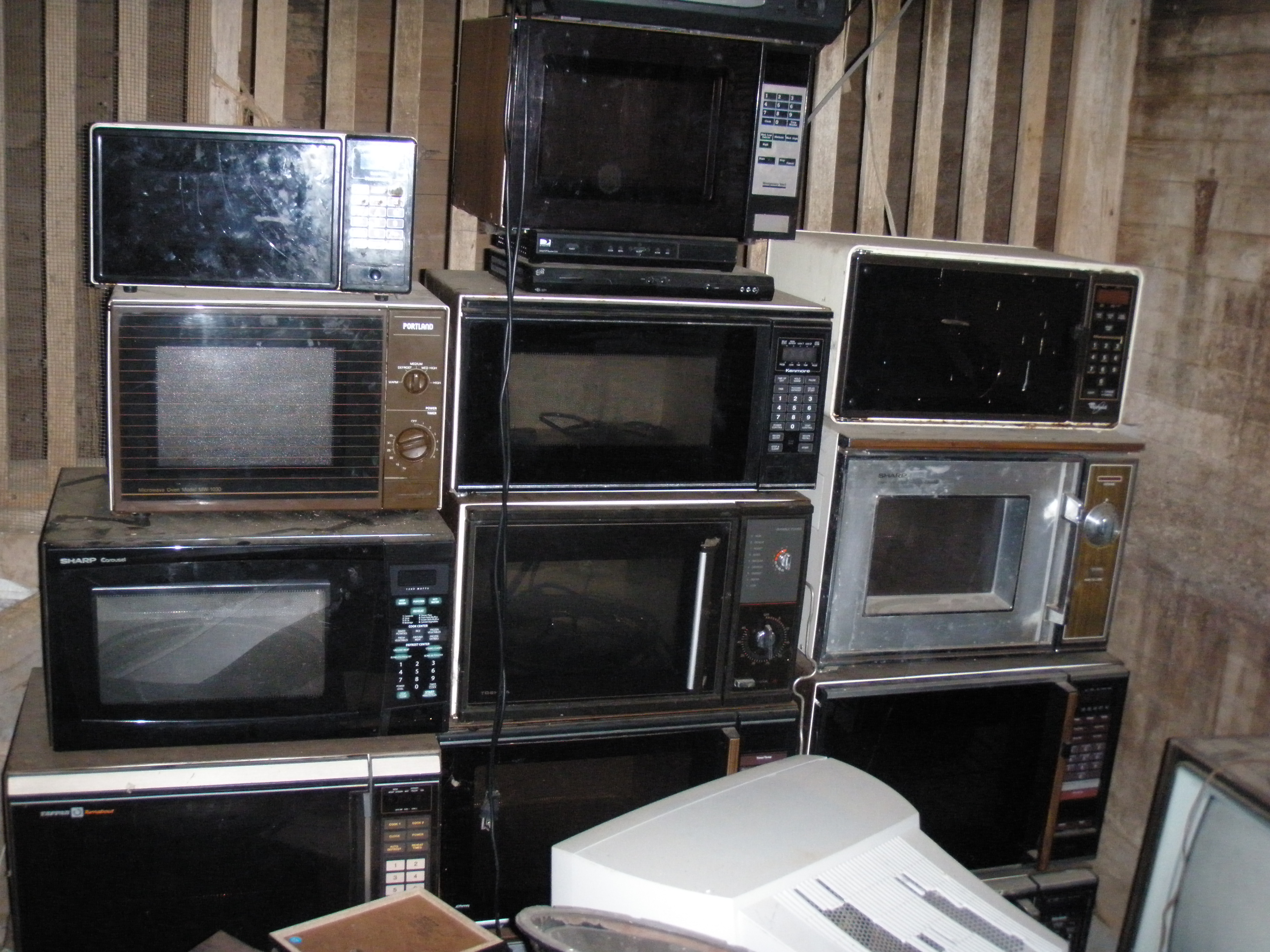
Microwave ovens from the 1980s

In 1945, the heating effect of a high-power microwave beam was independently and accidentally discovered by Percy Spencer, an American self-taught engineer from Howland, Maine. While employed at Raytheon, he noticed that microwaves from an active radar set he was working on started to melt a candy bar he had in his pocket. The first food deliberately cooked by Spencer was popcorn, and the second was an egg, which exploded in the face of one of the experimenters.

To verify his finding, Spencer created a high-density electromagnetic field by feeding microwave power from a magnetron into a metal box from which it had no way to escape. When food was placed in the box with the microwave energy, the temperature of the food rose rapidly. On October 8, 1945, Raytheon filed a United States patent application for Spencer's microwave cooking process, and an oven that heated food using microwave energy from a magnetron was soon placed in a Boston restaurant for testing.

=== Public demonstration, 1946 ===
On 7 October 1946, Raytheon showed two "Radarange" units to the press at the Waldorf-Astoria in New York City. Aimed initially for commercial use, one unit was designed for "for limited baking in sandwich shops," the other "for the preparation of frozen foods and designed for planes"—to enable serving a "complete meal on a single plate." Projected retail cost was then $1250. On 30 December 1946, the Federal Communications Commission approved the 2450 megacycle (megahertz) frequency for Raytheon's new product.

=== Commercial availability ===
Raytheon RadaRange aboard the NS Savannah nuclear-powered cargo ship, installed c. 1961

Sharp 1000W/R-21LC commercial grade microwave oven

In 1947, Raytheon built the "Radarange", the first commercially available microwave oven. It was almost 1.8 metres (5 ft 11 in) tall, and weighed 340 kilograms (750 lb). It consumed 3 kilowatts, about three times as much as today's microwave ovens, and was water-cooled. The name was the winning entry in an employee contest. Because Raytheon was continuously refining the early models of its Radarange, early models were at first leased—rather than sold—to hotels and restaurants. The cost was publicized as $5/day ($150/month). By March 1948 about 100 units were in commercial use in the U.S., including some factory cafeterias.

By early 1952 the Pennsylvania Railroad was advertising use of the Radarange on several of its eastern U.S. lines. The ocean liner SS United States was Radarange-equipped as well. On 23 March 1952, the Radarange was demonstrated on KTTV (Los Angeles). An early Radarange was installed (and remains) in the galley of the nuclear-powered passenger/cargo ship NS Savannah.

In 1953-54, as actual home-version production grew nearer, demonstrator models were placed in select Raytheon TV-radio-appliance dealerships in several states.

In late 1954 a Raytheon VP disclosed US$3,500 (equivalent to $41,961 in 2025) pricing of its commercial units, while pledging that consumer models “to be manufactured by various stove companies in cooperation with Raytheon” would be marketed within a few months, priced at about US$1,000 (equivalent to $11,989 in 2025).

The Tappan Stove Co. (Mansfield, Ohio) had been licensed by Raytheon in 1952 to develop and market consumer microwave ovens. One was exhibited in New York on 27 October 1955; Tappan had already had prototype models—freestanding and in-wall—in use by Mansfield housewives for the better part of a year.

Though Tappan had once pledged an early-1956 release, U.S. appliance dealers began exhibiting the “Tappan Electronic Oven” only in April 1956, typically advertised at $1250. Tappan eventually produced several variations of its built-in model under contract to Whirlpool, Westinghouse, and other major appliance manufacturers looking to add matching microwave ovens to their conventional oven line. Due to cost and maintenance needs (some units were water-cooled) sales were limited.

Japan's Sharp Corporation began manufacturing microwave ovens in 1961. Between 1964 and 1966, Sharp introduced the first microwave oven with a turntable, an alternative means to promote more even heating of food. In 1965, Raytheon, looking to expand their Radarange technology into the home market, acquired Amana to provide more manufacturing capability. In 1967, they introduced the first popular home model, the countertop Radarange, at a price of US$495 ($5,000 in 2025 dollars). Unlike the Sharp models, a motor driven mode stirrer in the top of the oven cavity rotated allowing the food to remain stationary.

=== Residential use ===
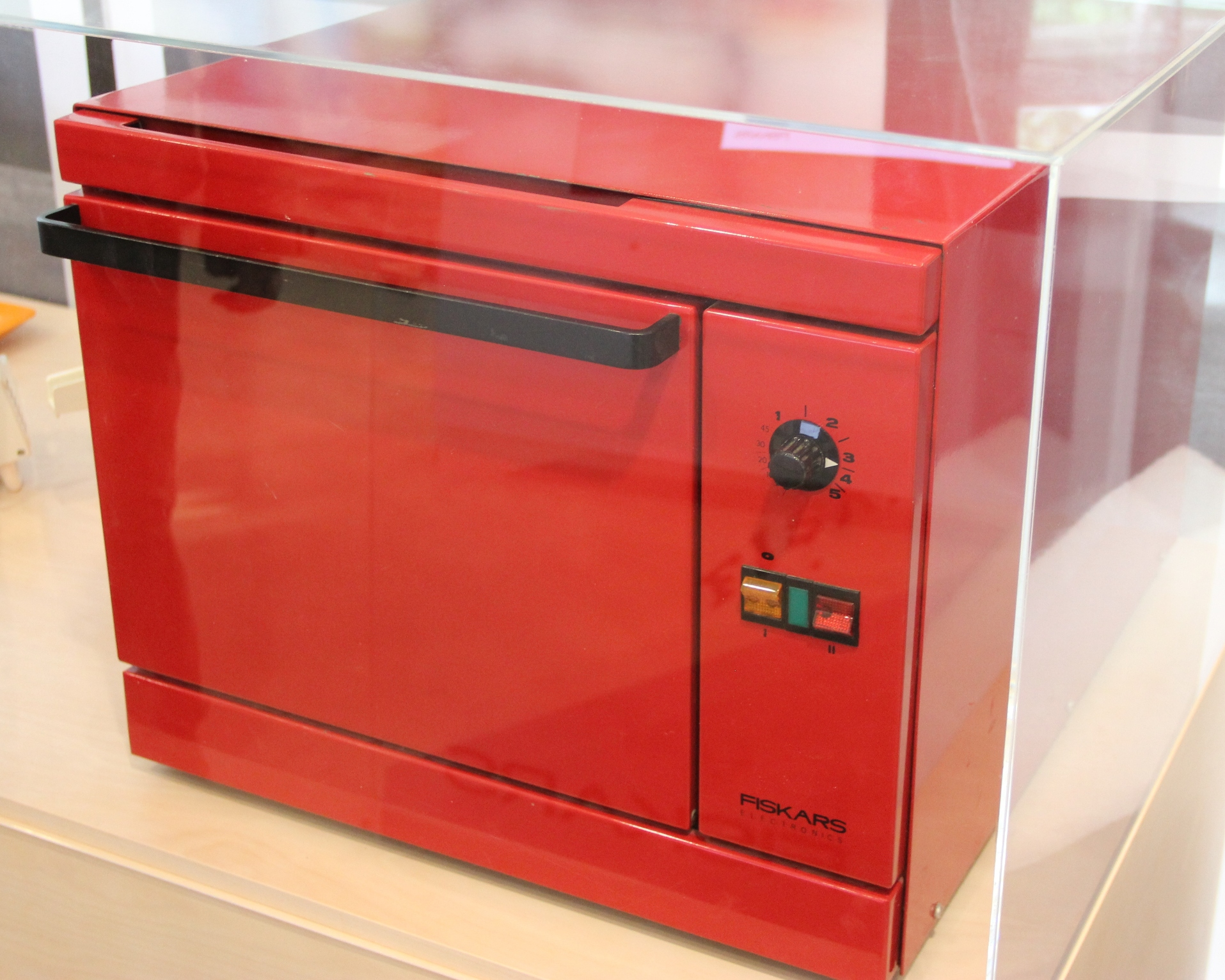
Finnish Fiskars microwave from 1965

While uncommon today, combination microwave-ranges were offered by major appliance manufacturers through much of the 1970s as a natural progression of the technology. Both Tappan and General Electric offered units that appeared to be conventional stove top/oven ranges, but included microwave capability in the conventional oven cavity. Such ranges were attractive to consumers since both microwave energy and conventional heating elements could be used simultaneously to speed cooking, and there was no loss of countertop space. The proposition was also attractive to manufacturers as the additional component cost could better be absorbed compared with countertop units where pricing was increasingly market-sensitive.

By 1972, Litton (Litton Atherton Division, Minneapolis) introduced two new microwave ovens, priced at $349 and $399, to tap into the market estimated at $750 million by 1976, according to Robert I Bruder, president of the division. While prices remained high, new features continued to be added to home models. Amana introduced automatic defrost in 1974 on their RR-4D model, and was the first to offer a microprocessor controlled digital control panel in 1975 with their RR-6 model.

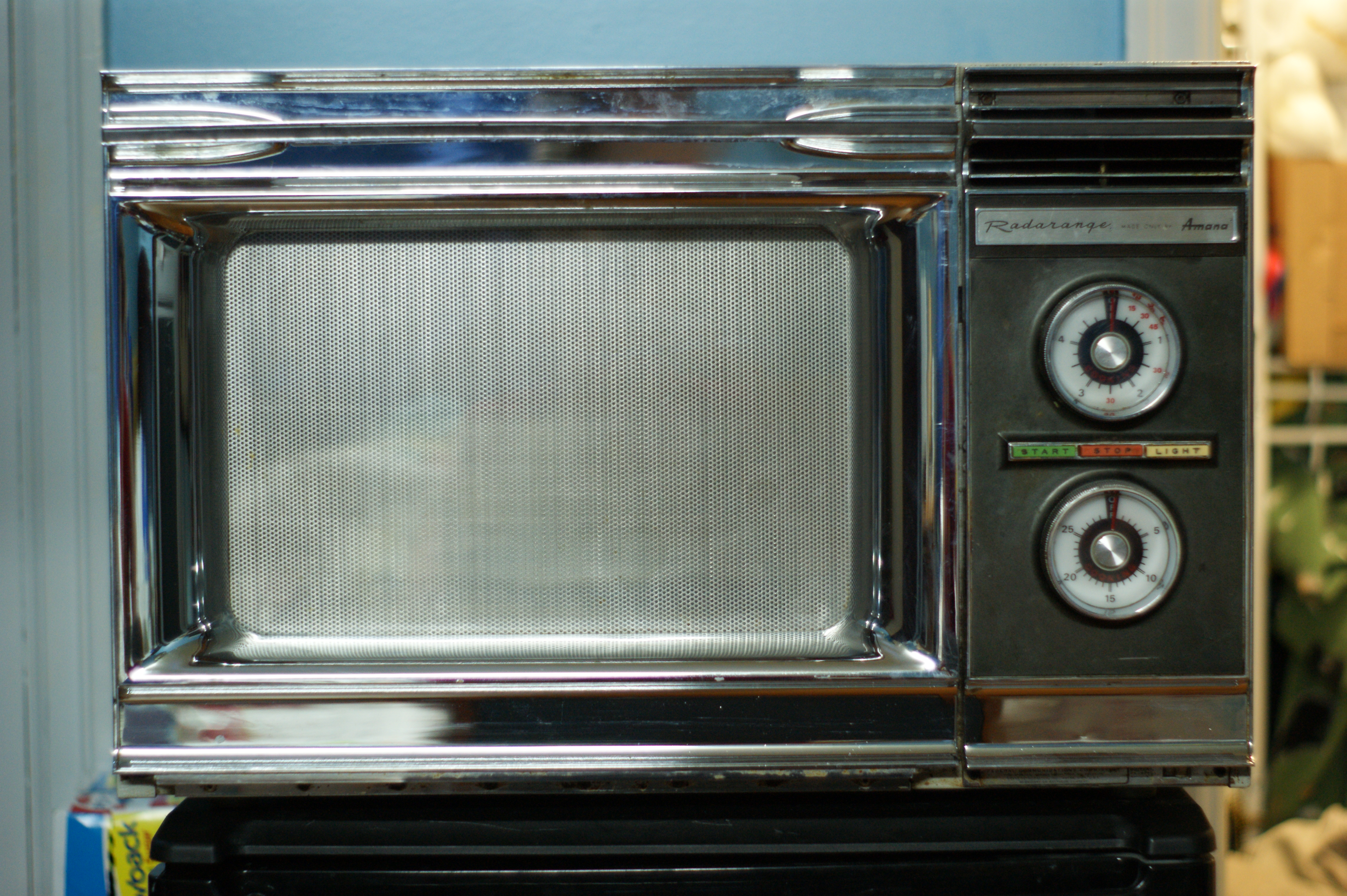
1974 Radarange RR-4. By the late 1970s, technological advances led to rapidly falling prices. Often called "electronic ovens" in the 1960s, the name "microwave oven" later gained currency, and they are now informally called "microwaves".

The late 1970s saw an explosion of low-cost countertop models from many major manufacturers.

In addition to cooking food, microwave ovens are used for heating in many industrial processes. Formerly found only in large industrial applications, microwave ovens increasingly became a standard fixture of residential kitchens in developed countries. By 1986, roughly 25% of households in the U.S. owned a microwave oven, up from only about 1% in 1971; the U.S. Bureau of Labor Statistics reported that over 90% of American households owned a microwave oven in 1997. In Australia, a 2008 market research study found that 95% of kitchens contained a microwave oven and that 83% of them were used daily. In Canada, fewer than 5% of households had a microwave oven in 1979, but more than 88% of households owned one by 1998. In France, 40% of households owned a microwave oven in 1994, but that number had increased to 65% by 2004.

Adoption has been slower in less-developed countries, as households with disposable income concentrate on more important household appliances like refrigerators and ovens. In India, for example, only about 5% of households owned a microwave oven in 2013, well behind refrigerators at 31% ownership. However, microwave ovens are gaining popularity. In Russia, for example, the number of households with a microwave oven grew from almost 24% in 2002 to almost 40% in 2008. Almost twice as many households in South Africa owned microwave ovens in 2008 (38.7%) as in 2002 (19.8%). Microwave oven ownership in Vietnam in 2008 was at 16% of households, versus 30% ownership of refrigerators; this rate was up significantly from 6.7% microwave oven ownership in 2002, with 14% ownership for refrigerators that year.

Consumer household microwave ovens usually come with a cooking power of between 600 and 1200 watts. Microwave cooking power, also referred to as output wattage, is lower than its input wattage, which is the manufacturer's listed power rating.

The size of household microwave ovens can vary, but usually have an internal volume of around 20 liters (1,200 cu in; 0.71 cu ft), and external dimensions of approximately 45–60 cm (1 ft 6 in – 2 ft 0 in) wide, 35–40 cm (1 ft 2 in – 1 ft 4 in) deep and 25–35 cm (9.8 in – 1 ft 1.8 in) tall. Countertop microwaves vary in weight 23 – 45 lbs.

Simply radiating microwaves into a chamber intrinsically results in very uneven energy distribution, over- and under-heating various parts of the food. Only the cheapest units lack mechanisms that mitigate this problem, requiring the user to more frequently stop the cooking to stir or move the food. For reasonably even heating, a microwave oven must have either multiple magnetrons, common in commercial units, a microwave stirrer, which is a fan-like mechanism in which microwave-reflective blades spin to vary the radiation pattern (usually at the top of the chamber, hidden above a microwave-transparent plastic cover), or a turntable, which effectively reduces the capacity of the oven to the space above the turntable, wasting at least nearly a quarter of the volume of a square chamber. Food is always placed above the bottom of the microwave-reflecting chamber, allowing microwave energy to reach the bottom of the food; in a flatbed unit the floor of the visible chamber is of a microwave-transparent material above the microwave-reflecting bottom, and in better units some of the microwave radiation enters through the transparent floor. In a non-flatbed unit there is either a glass tray shaped to fit the chamber, keeping the food some distance from the reflective bottom, or, in a unit with a turntable, the turntable itself is microwave-transparent and sits above the reflective bottom.

By position and type, US DOE classifies them as (1) countertop or (2) over the range and built-in (wall oven for a cabinet or a drawer model).

A conventional microwave oven has only one output power level, with intermediate power settings achieved using duty-cycle modulation, switching the magnetron on and off every few seconds, with more time on for higher settings. An inverter-type unit, however, can effectively sustain lower power output instead of switching full power on and off, heating food more evenly. Apart from offering superior cooking ability, these microwaves are generally more energy-efficient.

As of 2020, the majority of countertop microwave ovens (regardless of brand) sold in the United States were manufactured by the Midea Group.

=== Categories ===
Microwave-safe symbol

Domestic microwave ovens are typically marked with the microwave-safe symbol, next to the device's approximate IEC 60705 output power rating, in watts (typically either: 600W, 700W, 800W, 900W, 1000W), and a voluntary Heating Category (A-E).

== Principles ==
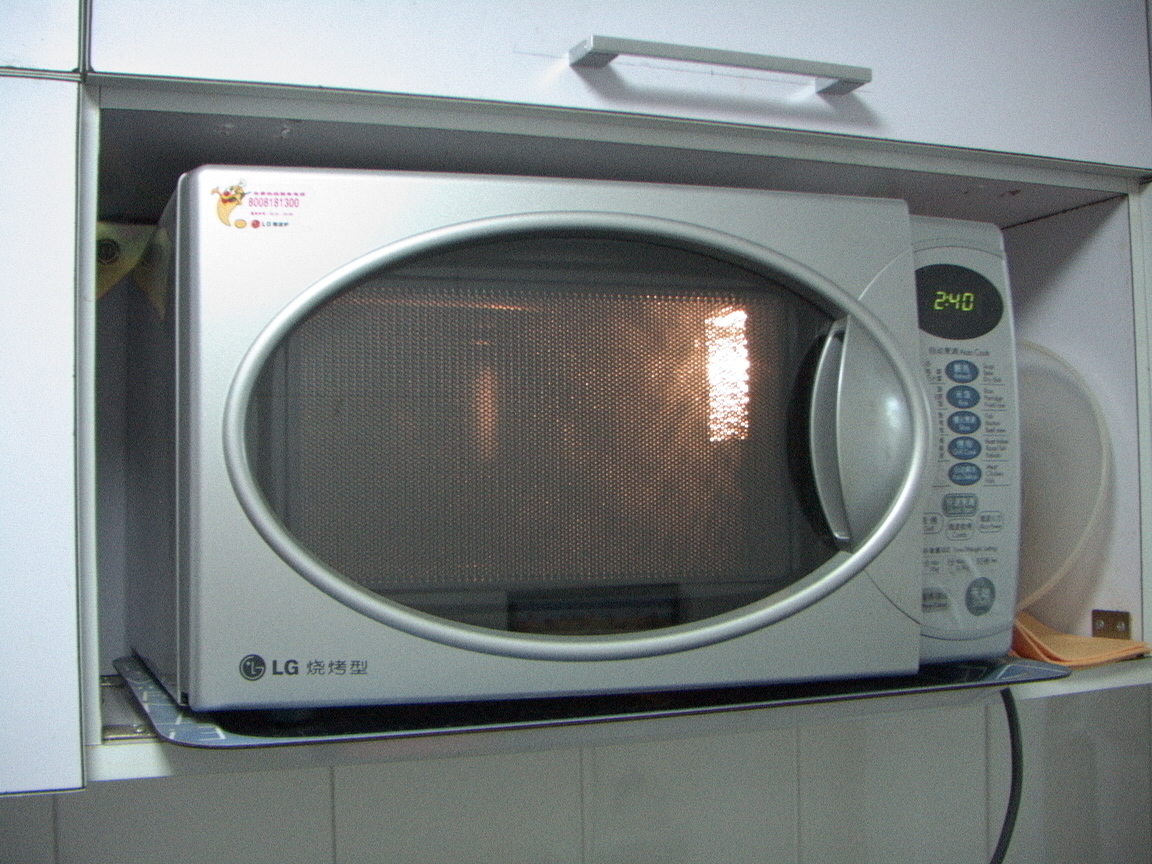
A microwave oven, c. 2005

Simulation of the electric field inside a microwave oven for the first 8 ns of operation

A microwave oven heats food by passing microwave radiation through it, a process known as dielectric heating. Microwaves are a form of non-ionizing electromagnetic radiation with a frequency between 300 MHz and 300 GHz. Microwave ovens use frequencies in one of the ISM (industrial, scientific, medical) bands, so they do not interfere with other vital radio services.

Dielectric heating takes advantage of the electric dipole structure of water molecules, fats, and many other substances in the food. These molecules have a partial positive charge at one end and a partial negative charge at the other. In an alternating electric field, they will rotate as they continually try to align themselves to the field. Once the electrical field's energy is initially absorbed, heat will gradually spread through the object similarly to any other contact with a hotter body.

It is a common misconception that microwave ovens heat food at a special resonance of water molecules in the food. Instead, all polar molecules participate, and dielectric heating for each molecule can happen over a wide range of frequencies.

Typically, consumer ovens work around a nominal 2.45 gigahertz (GHz) – a wavelength of 12.2 centimetres (4.80 in) in the 2.4 GHz to 2.5 GHz ISM band – while large industrial / commercial ovens often use 915 megahertz (MHz) – 32.8 centimetres (12.9 in). Among other differences, the longer wavelength of a commercial microwave oven allows the initial heating effects to begin deeper within the food or liquid, and therefore become evenly spread within its bulk sooner, as well as raising the temperature deep within the food more quickly.

=== Defrosting ===
Microwave heating is more efficient on liquid water than on frozen water, where the movement of molecules is more restricted. Defrosting is done at a low power setting, allowing time for conduction to carry heat to still frozen parts of food. Dielectric heating of liquid water is also temperature-dependent: At 0 °C, dielectric loss is greatest at a field frequency of about 10 GHz, and for higher water temperatures at higher field frequencies.

=== Fats and sugar ===
Sugars and triglycerides (fats and oils) absorb microwaves due to the dipole moments of their hydroxyl groups or ester groups. Due to their molecular dipole moment, however, they are heated less efficiently. (Note: Here "efficient" means that more energy is deposited and temperature rises faster, not necessarily that the temperature rises to a higher maximum. The maximum temperature is also a function of the material's specific heat capacity, which for most substances is lower than water. For a practical example, milk heats slightly faster than water in a microwave oven, but only because milk solids have less heat capacity than the water they replace.)

Although fats and sugar typically absorb energy less efficiently than water, their temperatures rise faster and higher than water when cooking due to their lower specific heat capacities. Fats and oils require less energy delivered per gram of material to raise their temperature by 1 °C than does water and they begin cooling off by "boiling" only after reaching a higher temperature than water (the temperature they require to vaporize is higher), so inside microwave ovens they normally reach higher temperatures – sometimes much higher. This can induce temperatures in oil or fatty foods like bacon far above the boiling point of water, and high enough to induce some browning reactions, much in the manner of conventional broiling (UK: grilling), braising, or deep fat frying.

The effect is most often noticed by consumers from unexpected damage to plastic containers when microwaving foods high in sugar, starch, or fat generates higher temperatures. Foods high in water content and with little oil rarely exceed the boiling temperature of water and do not damage plastic.

=== Cookware ===
Cookware must be transparent to microwaves. Conductive cookware, such as metal pots, reflects microwaves, and prevents the microwaves from reaching the food. Cookware made of materials with high electrical permittivity will absorb microwaves, resulting in the cookware heating rather than the food. Cookware made of melamine resin is a common type of cookware that will heat in a microwave oven, reducing the effectiveness of the microwave oven and creating a hazard from burns or shattered cookware.

=== Thermal runaway ===
Microwave heating can cause localized thermal runaways in some materials with low thermal conductivity which also have dielectric constants that increase with temperature. An example is glass, which can exhibit thermal runaway in a microwave oven to the point of melting if preheated. Additionally, microwaves can melt certain types of rocks, producing small quantities of molten rock. Some ceramics can also be melted, and may even become clear upon cooling. Thermal runaway is more typical of electrically conductive liquids such as salty water.

=== Penetration ===
Another misconception is that microwave ovens cook food "from the inside out", meaning from the center of the entire mass of food outwards. This idea arises from heating behavior seen if an absorbent layer of water lies beneath a less absorbent drier layer at the surface of a food; in this case, the deposition of heat energy inside a food can exceed that on its surface. This can also occur if the inner layer has a lower heat capacity than the outer layer causing it to reach a higher temperature, or even if the inner layer is more thermally conductive than the outer layer making it feel hotter despite having a lower temperature. In most cases, however, with uniformly structured or reasonably homogeneous food item, microwaves are absorbed in the outer layers of the item at a similar level to that of the inner layers.

Depending on water content, the depth of initial heat deposition may be several centimetres or more with microwave ovens, in contrast with broiling / grilling (infrared) or convection heating methods which thinly deposit heat at the food surface. Penetration depth of microwaves depends on food composition and the frequency, with lower microwave frequencies (longer wavelengths) penetrating deeper.

=== Energy consumption ===
In use, microwave ovens can be as low as 50% efficient at converting electricity into microwaves, but energy-efficient models can exceed 64% efficiency. Stovetop cooking is 40–90% efficient, depending on the type of appliance used.

Because they are used fairly infrequently, the average residential microwave oven consumes only 72 kWh per year. Globally, microwave ovens used an estimated 77 TWh per year in 2018, or 0.3% of global electricity generation.

A 2000 study by Lawrence Berkeley National Laboratory found that the average microwave drew almost 3 watts of standby power when not being used, which would total approximately 26 kWh per year. New efficiency standards imposed in 2016 by the United States Department of Energy require less than 1 watt, or approximately 9 kWh per year, of standby power for most types of microwave ovens.

== Components ==
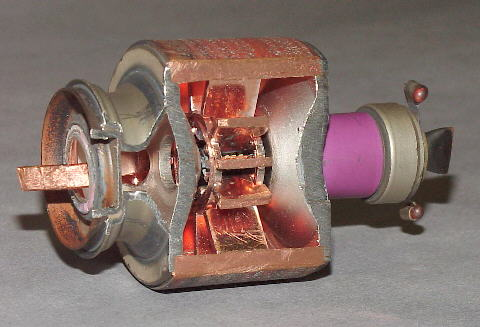
A magnetron with section removed (magnet is not shown)

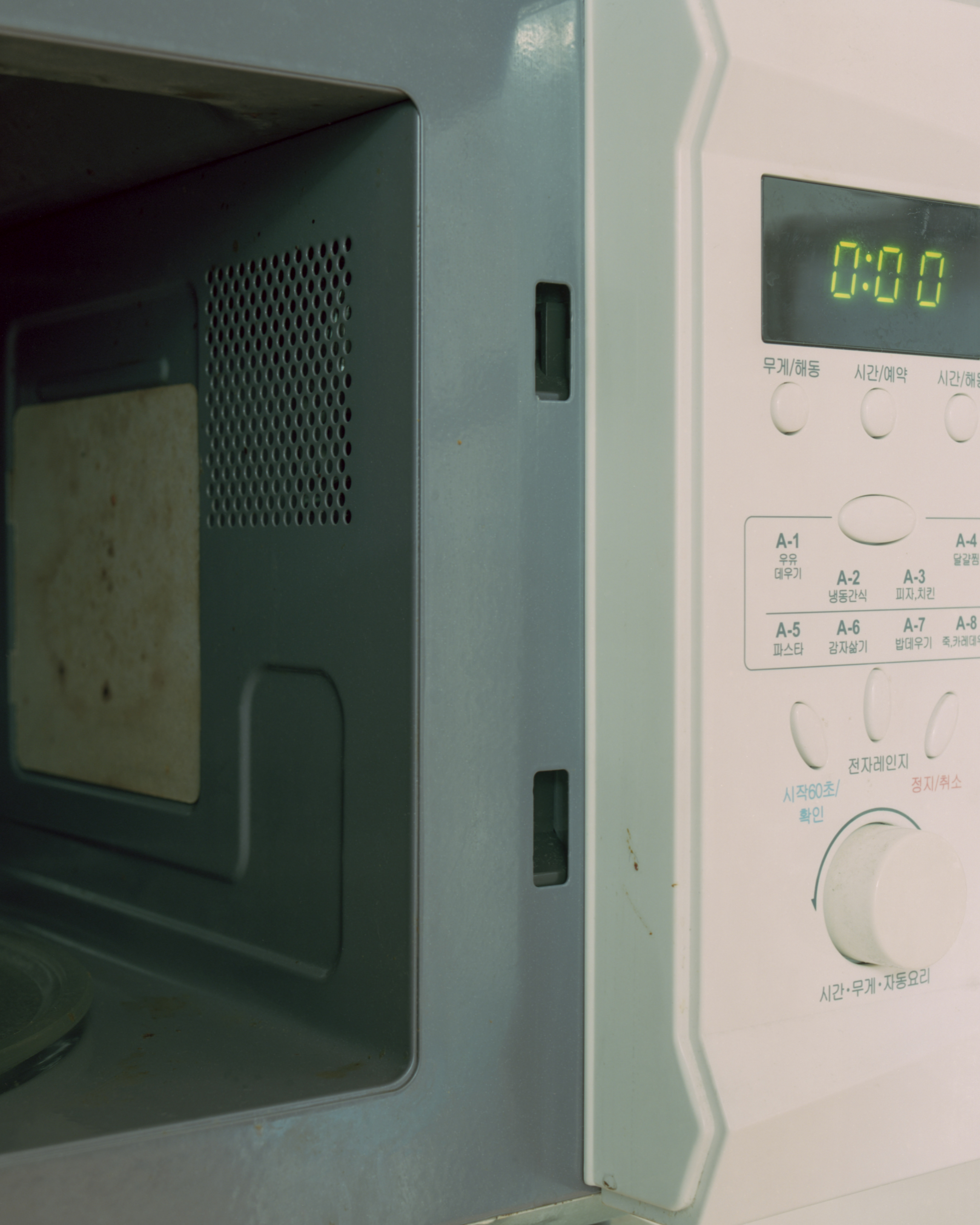
Inner space of a microwave oven and its control panel

A microwave oven generally consists of:

- a high-voltage DC power source, either:
  - a large high voltage transformer with a voltage doubler (a high-voltage capacitor and a diode)
  - an electronic power converter usually based around an inverter.
- a cavity magnetron, which converts the high-voltage DC electric energy to microwave radiation
- a magnetron control circuit (usually with a microcontroller)
- a short waveguide (to couple microwave power from the magnetron into the cooking chamber)
- a turntable and/or metal wave guide stirring fan
- a control panel

In most ovens, the magnetron is driven by a linear transformer which can only feasibly be switched completely on or off. (One variant of the GE Spacemaker had two taps on the transformer primary, for high and low power modes.) Usually choice of power level does not affect intensity of the microwave radiation; instead, the magnetron is cycled on and off every few seconds, thus altering the large scale duty cycle. Newer models use inverter power supplies that use pulse-width modulation to provide effectively continuous heating at reduced power settings, so that foods are heated more evenly at a given power level and can be heated more quickly without being damaged by uneven heating.

The microwave frequencies used in microwave ovens are chosen based on regulatory and cost constraints. The first is that they should be in one of the industrial, scientific, and medical (ISM) frequency bands set aside for unlicensed purposes. For household purposes, 2.45 GHz has the advantage over 915 MHz in that 915 MHz is only an ISM band in some countries (ITU Region 2) while 2.45 GHz is available worldwide. Three additional ISM bands exist in the microwave frequencies, but are not used for microwave cooking. Two of them are centered on 5.8 GHz and 24.125 GHz, but are not used for microwave cooking because of the very high cost of power generation at these frequencies. The third, centered on 433.92 MHz, is a narrow band that would require expensive equipment to generate sufficient power without creating interference outside the band, and is only available in some countries.

The cooking chamber is similar to a Faraday cage to prevent the waves from coming out of the oven. Even though there is no continuous metal-to-metal contact around the rim of the door, choke connections on the door edges act like metal-to-metal contact, at the frequency of the microwaves, to prevent leakage. The oven door usually has a window for easy viewing, with a layer of conductive mesh some distance from the outer panel to maintain the shielding. Because the size of the perforations in the mesh is much less than the microwaves' wavelength (12.2 cm for the usual 2.45 GHz), microwave radiation cannot pass through the door, while visible light (with its much shorter wavelength) can.

=== Control panel ===
Modern microwave ovens use either an analog dial-type timer or a digital control panel for operation. Control panels feature an LED, LCD or vacuum fluorescent display, buttons for entering the cook time and a power level selection feature. A defrost option is typically offered, as either a power level or a separate function. Some models include pre-programmed settings for different food types, typically taking weight as input. In the 1990s, brands such as Panasonic and GE began offering models with a scrolling-text display showing cooking instructions.

Power settings are commonly implemented not by actually varying the power output, but by switching the emission of microwave energy off and on at intervals. The highest setting thus represents continuous power. Defrost might represent power for two seconds followed by no power for five seconds. To indicate cooking has completed, an audible warning such as a bell or a beeper is usually present, and/or "End" usually appears on the display of a digital microwave.

Microwave control panels are often considered awkward to use and are frequently employed as examples of poor user interface design.

== Variants and accessories ==
A variant of the conventional microwave oven is known as the convection microwave oven or combination microwave oven, a combination of a standard microwave oven and a convection oven. It allows food to be cooked quickly, yet come out browned or crisped, as from a convection oven. Plastic cookware is unsuitable for use with thermal heating as it does not withstand high temperatures. Convection microwave ovens are more expensive than conventional microwave ovens. Some convection microwave ovens—those with exposed heating elements—can produce smoke and burning odors as food spatter from earlier microwave-only use is burned off the heating elements. Some ovens use high-speed air; these are known as impingement ovens and are designed to cook food quickly in restaurants, but cost more and consume more power.

In 2000, some manufacturers began offering added high-power quartz halogen bulbs to their convection microwave ovens, marketing them under names such as "Speedcook", "Advantium", "Lightwave" and "Optimawave" to emphasize their ability to cook food rapidly and with good browning. The bulbs heat the food's surface with infrared (IR) radiation, browning surfaces as in a conventional oven, while the microwave radiation penetrates and cooks the inside. The IR energy is sufficient to initiate browning caramelization in foods primarily made up of carbohydrates, and Maillard reactions in foods primarily made up of protein. These reactions in food produce a texture and taste similar to that of thermal oven cooking rather than the bland and often soggy exterior that microwave-only cooking produces in many foods.

To brown food with microwave energy, sometimes an accessory browning tray is used, usually made of glass or porcelain with a coating that is heated by absorbing microwave energy, browning the top layer of food. Frozen meals, pies, and microwave popcorn bags may contain a susceptor made from thin aluminium film in the packaging or included on a small paper tray. The metal film absorbs microwave energy efficiently and consequently becomes extremely hot and radiates in the infrared, concentrating the heating of oil for popcorn or even browning surfaces of frozen foods. Heating packages or trays containing susceptors are discarded after a single use.

== Heating characteristics ==
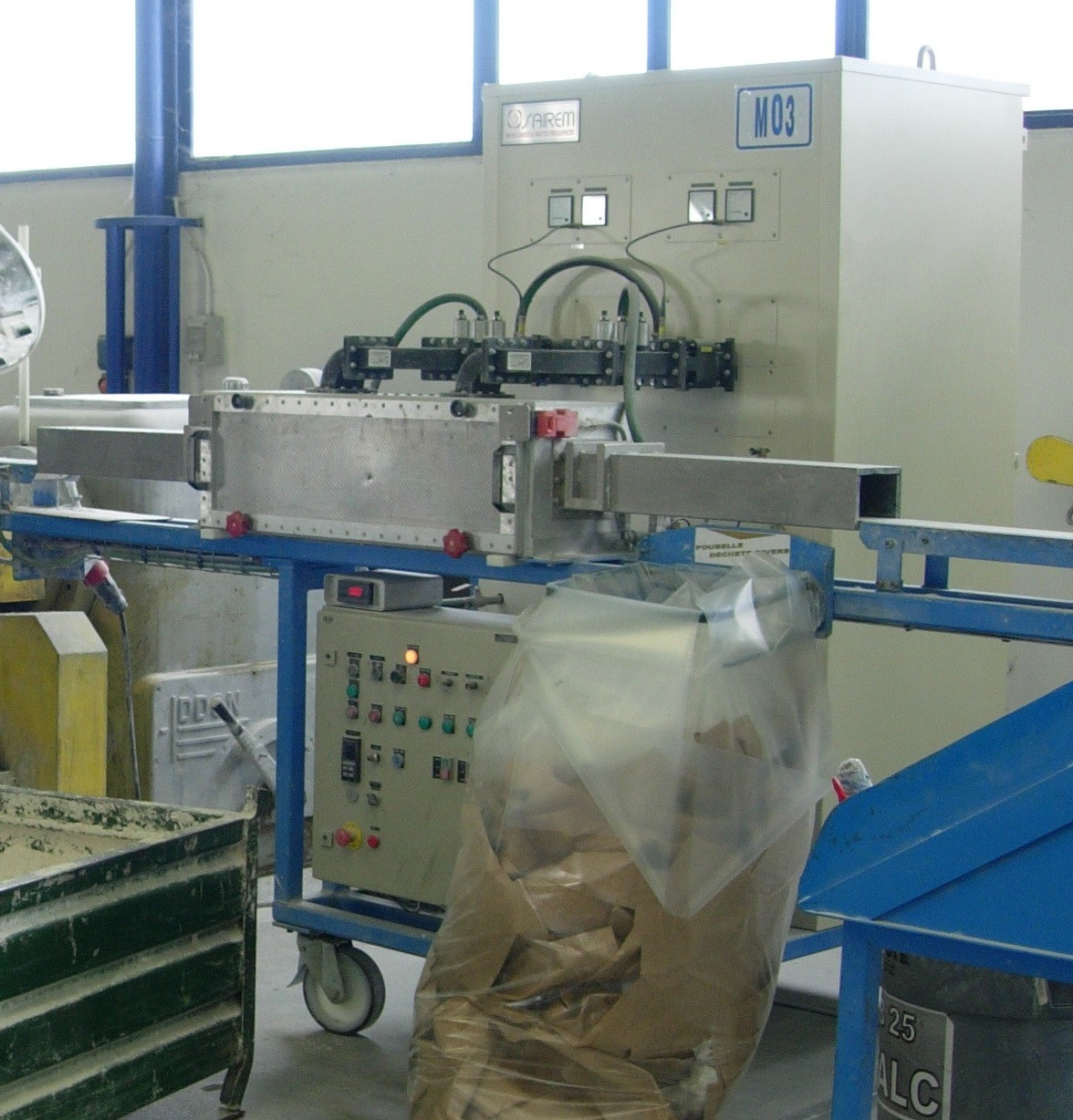
In addition to their use in heating food, microwave ovens are widely used for heating in industrial processes, such as this microwave tunnel oven for softening plastic rods prior to extrusion.

Microwave ovens have a limited role in professional cooking, because the boiling-range temperatures of a microwave oven do not produce the flavorful chemical reactions that frying, browning, or baking at a higher temperature produces. However, such high-heat sources can be added to microwave ovens in the form of a convection microwave oven.

Microwave ovens produce heat directly within the food, but despite the common misconception that microwaved food cooks from the inside out, 2.45 GHz microwaves can only penetrate approximately 1 cm (0.4 in) into most foods. The inside portions of thicker foods are mainly heated by heat conducted from the outer 1 cm.

Uneven heating in microwaved food can be partly due to the uneven distribution of microwave energy inside the oven, and partly due to the different rates of energy absorption in different parts of the food. The first problem is reduced by a stirrer, a type of fan that reflects microwave energy to different parts of the oven as it rotates, or by a turntable or carousel that turns the food; turntables, however, may still leave spots, such as the center of the oven, which receive uneven energy distribution.

The location of dead spots and hot spots in a microwave oven can be mapped out by placing a damp piece of thermal paper in the oven: When the water-saturated paper is subjected to the microwave radiation it becomes hot enough to cause the dye to be darkened which can provide a visual representation of the microwaves. If multiple layers of paper are constructed in the oven with a sufficient distance between them a three-dimensional map can be created. Many store receipts are printed on thermal paper which allows this to be easily done at home.

The second problem is due to food composition and geometry, and must be addressed by the cook, by arranging the food so that it absorbs energy evenly, and periodically testing and shielding any parts of the food that overheat. In some materials with low thermal conductivity, where dielectric constant increases with temperature, microwave heating can cause localized thermal runaway. Under certain conditions, glass can exhibit thermal runaway in a microwave oven to the point of melting.

Due to uneven heating, microwave ovens set at too-high power levels may even start to cook the edges of frozen food while the inside of the food remains frozen. Another case of uneven heating can be observed in baked goods containing berries. In these items, the berries absorb more energy than the drier surrounding bread and cannot dissipate the heat due to the low thermal conductivity of the bread, often overheating the berries. "Defrost" oven settings either use low power levels or repeatedly turn the power off and on – intended to allow time for heat to be conducted within frozen foods from areas that absorb heat more readily to those which heat more slowly. In turntable-equipped ovens, heating can be more even if food is not centered on the turntable tray, so that no part of the food remains in the same place as the turntable rotates.

Some microwave ovens allow full-power defrosting by exploiting the properties of the electromagnetic radiation LSM modes. LSM full-power defrosting may achieve more even results than slow defrosting.

Microwave heating can be deliberately uneven by design. Some microwavable packages (notably pies) may include materials that contain ceramic or aluminium flakes, which are designed to absorb microwaves and heat up, aiding baking or crust preparation by depositing more energy shallowly in these areas. The technical term for such a microwave-absorbing patch is a susceptor. Susceptor patches affixed to cardboard, easily identifiable as they are typically smokey blue or gray, are positioned next to the food; the cardboard sleeves included with Hot Pockets, which have a silver surface on the inside, are an example of such packaging. Microwavable cardboard packaging may also contain overhead ceramic patches which function in the same way.

=== Effects on food and nutrients ===
Any form of cooking diminishes overall nutrient content in food, particularly water-soluble vitamins common in vegetables. Key variables are how much water is used, for how long, and at what temperature. Nutrients are primarily lost by leaching into cooking water, which tends to make microwave cooking effective due to its shorter cooking times and using little or no water beyond that contained in the food and consumed. Like other heating methods, microwaving converts vitamin B_{12} from an active to inactive form; the amount of conversion depends on the temperature reached and the cooking time. Boiled food reaches a maximum of 100 °C (212 °F) (the boiling point of water), whereas microwaved food can get internally hotter than this, leading to faster breakdown of vitamin B_{12}. The higher rate of loss is partially offset by the shorter cooking times.

Spinach retains nearly all its folate when cooked in a microwave oven; when boiled in water that is discarded it loses about 77%, leaching nutrients into the cooking water. Bacon cooked by microwave oven has significantly lower levels of nitrosamines than conventionally cooked bacon. Steamed vegetables tend to maintain more nutrients when microwaved than when cooked on a stovetop. Microwave blanching is 3 to 4 times more effective than boiled-water blanching for retention of the water-soluble vitamins folate, thiamin and riboflavin; however about 29% of vitamin C is lost, compared with a 16% loss with boiled-water blanching.

=== Safety benefits and features ===
All microwave ovens use a timer to switch off the oven at the end of the cooking time.

Microwave ovens heat food without getting hot themselves, avoiding the burn hazard of most other cooking methods.

Food and cookware taken out of a microwave oven are rarely much hotter than 100 °C (212 °F). Cookware used in a microwave oven is often much cooler than the food because the cookware is transparent to microwaves, which penetrate the cookware and heat only the food, although the hot food heats the cookware to some extent. Other cooking methods usually heat cookware to dangerously high temperatures that require careful handling.

The lower temperature of cooking (the boiling point of water) is a significant safety benefit compared with baking in the oven or frying, because it eliminates the formation of tars and char, which are carcinogenic. Microwave radiation also penetrates deeper than direct heat, so that the food is heated by its own internal water content. In contrast, direct heat can burn the surface while the inside is still cold. Pre-heating the food in a microwave oven before putting it into the grill or pan reduces the time needed to heat up the food and reduces the formation of carcinogenic char. Unlike frying and baking, microwaving does not produce acrylamide in potatoes, however unlike deep-frying at high temperatures, it is of only limited effectiveness in reducing glycoalkaloid (i.e., solanine) levels. Acrylamide has been found in other microwaved products like such as popcorn.

=== Use in disinfecting kitchen sponges ===
Studies have investigated the use of the microwave oven to disinfect non-metallic domestic sponges which have been thoroughly wetted. A 2006 study found that microwaving wet sponges for 2 minutes at 1000-watt power removed 99% of coliforms, E. coli, and MS2 phages. Bacillus cereus spores were killed with 4 minutes of microwaving. A 2017 study found that although about 60% of the microbes were killed, the remaining ones quickly re-colonized the sponge.

== Issues ==
=== High temperatures ===
==== Closed containers ====
Closed containers, such as eggs, can explode when heated in a microwave oven due to the increased pressure from steam. Intact fresh egg yolks outside the shell also explode as a result of superheating. Insulating plastic foams of all types generally contain closed air pockets, and are generally not recommended for use in a microwave oven, as the air pockets explode and the foam (which can be toxic if consumed) may melt. Not all plastics are microwave-safe, and some plastics absorb microwaves to the point that they may become dangerously hot.

==== Fires ====
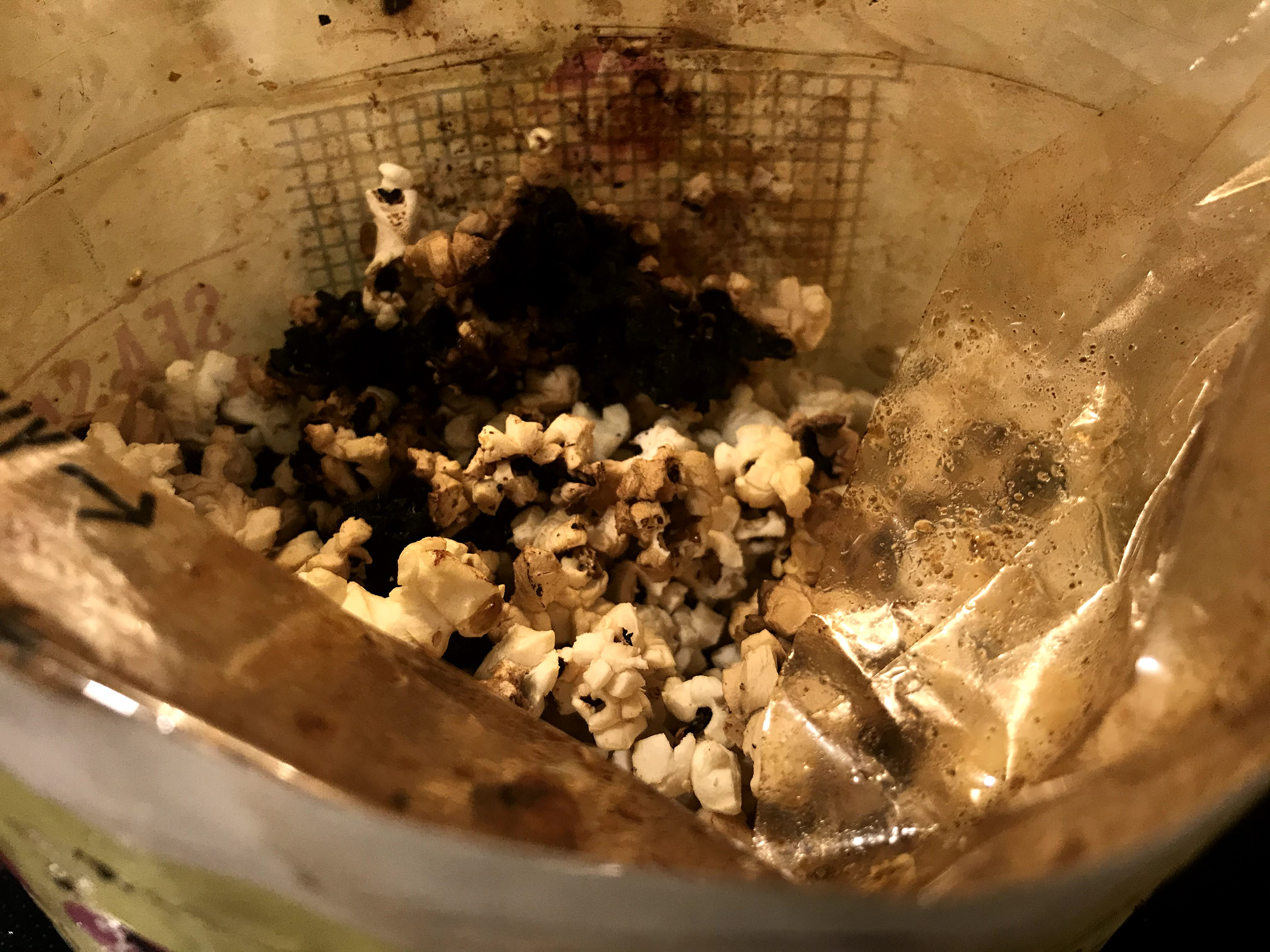
Charred popcorn burnt by leaving the microwave oven on too long

Products that are heated for too long can catch fire. Though this is inherent to any form of cooking, the rapid cooking and unattended nature of the use of microwave ovens results in additional hazard.

==== Superheating ====
In rare cases, water and other homogeneous liquids can superheat when heated in a microwave oven in a container with a smooth surface. That is, the liquid reaches a temperature slightly above its normal boiling point without bubbles of vapour forming inside the liquid. The boiling process can start explosively when the liquid is disturbed, such as when the user takes hold of the container to remove it from the oven or while adding solid ingredients such as powdered creamer or sugar. This can result in spontaneous boiling (nucleation) which may be violent enough to eject the boiling liquid from the container and cause severe scalding.

=== Metal objects ===
Contrary to popular assumptions, metal objects can be safely used in a microwave oven, but with some restrictions. Any metal or conductive object placed into the microwave oven acts as an antenna to some degree, resulting in an electric current. This causes the object to act as a heating element. This effect varies with the object's shape and composition, and is sometimes utilized for cooking.

Any object containing pointed metal can create an electric arc (sparks) when microwaved. This includes cutlery, crumpled aluminium foil (though some foil used in microwave ovens is safe, see below), twist-ties containing metal wire, the metal wire carry-handles in oyster pails, or almost any metal formed into a poorly conductive foil or thin wire, or into a pointed shape. Forks are a good example: the tines of the fork respond to the electric field by producing high concentrations of electric charge at the tips. This has the effect of exceeding the dielectric breakdown of air, about 3 megavolts per meter. The air forms a conductive plasma, which is visible as a spark. The plasma and the tines may then form a conductive loop, which may be a more effective antenna, resulting in a longer lived spark. When dielectric breakdown occurs in air, some ozone and nitrogen oxides are formed, both of which are unhealthy in large quantities.

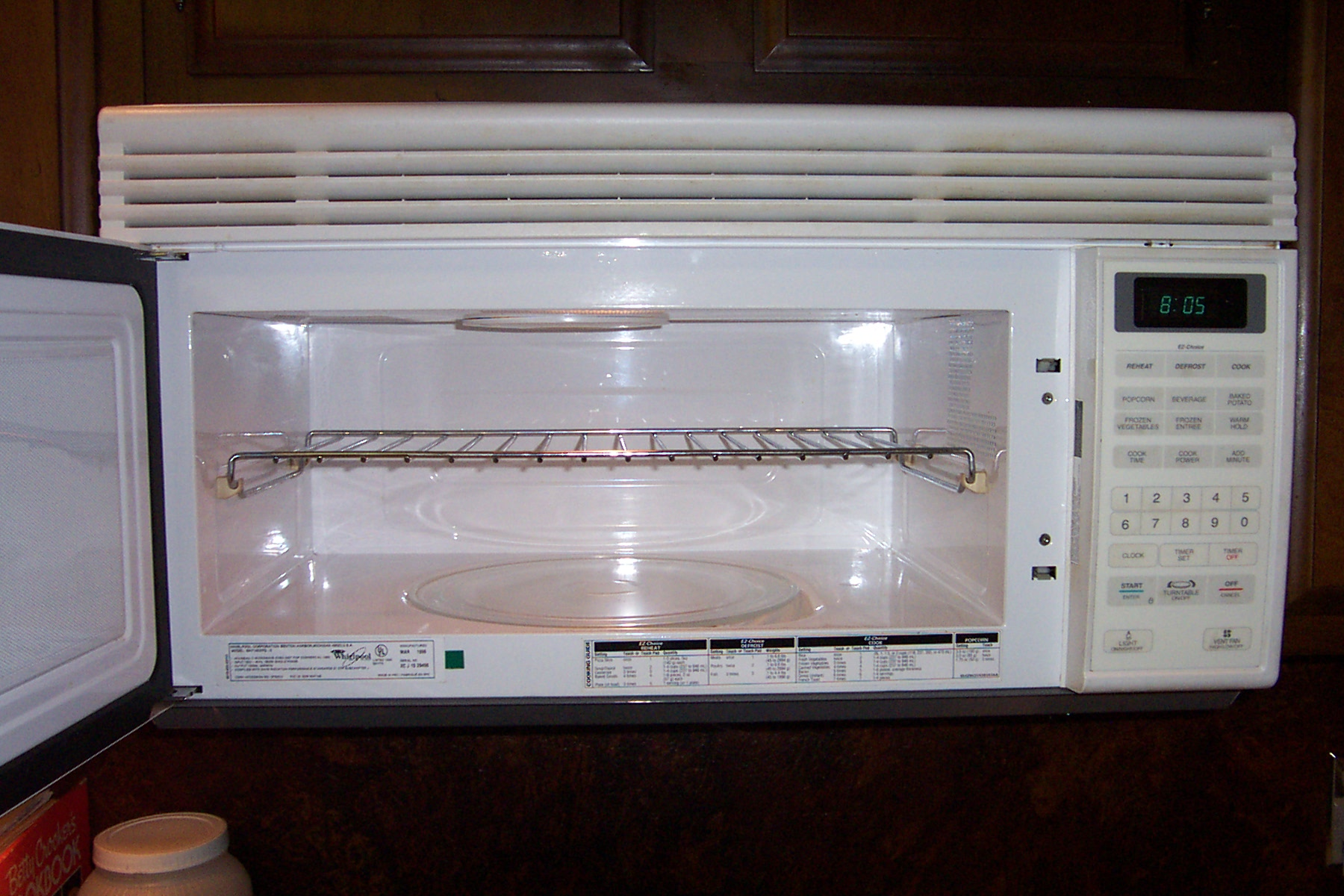
A microwave oven with a metal shelf

Microwaving an individual smooth metal object without pointed ends, for example, a spoon or shallow metal pan, usually does not produce sparking. Thick metal wire racks can be part of the interior design in microwave ovens (see illustration). In a similar way, the interior wall plates with perforating holes which allow light and air into the oven, and allow interior-viewing through the oven door, are all made of conductive metal formed in a safe shape.

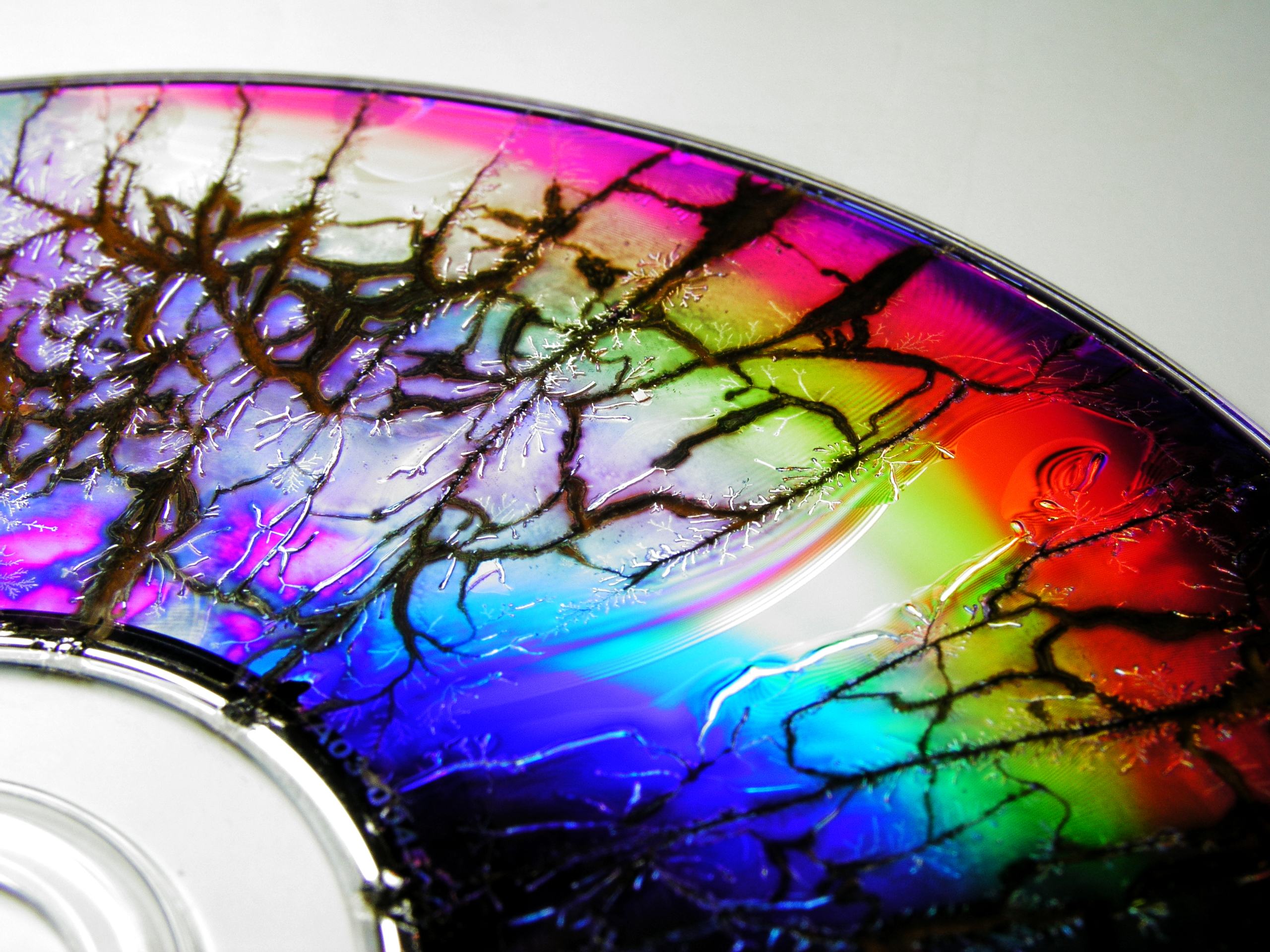
A microwaved DVD-R disc showing the effects of electrical discharge through its metal film

The effect of microwaving thin metal films can be seen clearly on a Compact Disc or DVD (particularly the factory pressed type). The microwaves induce electric currents in the metal film, which heats up, melting the plastic in the disc and leaving a visible pattern of concentric and radial scars. Similarly, porcelain with thin metal films can also be destroyed or damaged by microwaving. Aluminium foil is thick enough to be used in microwave ovens as a shield against heating parts of food items, if the foil is not badly warped. When wrinkled, aluminium foil is generally unsafe in microwaves, as manipulation of the foil causes sharp bends and gaps that invite sparking. The USDA recommends that aluminium foil used as a partial food shield in microwave oven cooking cover no more than one quarter of a food object, and be carefully smoothed to eliminate sparking hazards.

Another hazard is the resonance of the magnetron tube itself. If the microwave oven is run without an object to absorb the radiation, a standing wave forms. The energy is reflected back and forth between the tube and the cooking chamber. This may cause the tube to overload and burn out. High reflected power may also cause magnetron arcing, possibly resulting in primary power fuse failure, though such a causal relationship is not easily established. Thus, dehydrated food, or food wrapped in metal which does not arc, is problematic for overload reasons, without necessarily being a fire hazard.

Certain foods such as grapes, if properly arranged, can produce an electric arc. Prolonged arcing from food carries similar risks to arcing from other sources as noted above.

Some other objects that may conduct sparks are plastic/holographic print Thermos flasks and other heat-retaining containers (such as Starbucks novelty cups) or cups with metal lining. If any bit of the metal is exposed, all the outer shell can burst off the object or melt.

The high electrical fields generated inside a microwave oven often can be illustrated by placing a radiometer or neon glow-bulb inside the cooking chamber, creating glowing plasma inside the low-pressure bulb of the device.

=== Direct microwave exposure ===
Direct microwave exposure is not generally possible, as microwaves emitted by the source in a microwave oven are confined in the oven by the material out of which the oven is constructed. Furthermore, ovens are equipped with redundant safety interlocks, which remove power from the magnetron if the door is opened. This safety mechanism is required by United States federal regulations. Tests have shown confinement of the microwaves in commercially available ovens to be so nearly universal as to make routine testing unnecessary. According to the United States Food and Drug Administration's Center for Devices and Radiological Health, a U.S. Federal Standard limits the amount of microwaves that can leak from an oven throughout its lifetime to 5 milliwatts of microwave radiation per square centimeter at approximately 5 cm (2 in) from the surface of the oven. This is far below the exposure level currently considered to be harmful to human health.

The radiation produced by a microwave oven is non-ionizing. It therefore does not have the cancer risks associated with ionizing radiation such as X-rays and high-energy particles. Long-term rodent studies to assess cancer risk have so far failed to identify any carcinogenicity from 2.45 GHz microwave radiation even with chronic exposure levels (i.e. large fraction of life span) far larger than humans are likely to encounter from any leaking ovens. However, with the oven door open, the radiation may cause damage by heating. Microwave ovens are sold with a protective interlock so that it cannot be run when the door is open or improperly latched.

Microwaves generated in microwave ovens dissipate thoroughly once the electrical power is turned off. They do not remain in the food when the power is turned off, any more than light from an electric lamp remains in the walls and furnishings of a room when the lamp is turned off. They do not make the food or the oven radioactive. In contrast with conventional cooking, the nutritional content of some foods may be altered differently, but generally in a positive way by preserving more micronutrients – see above. There is no indication of detrimental health issues associated with microwaved food.

There are, however, a few cases where people have been exposed to direct microwave radiation, either from appliance malfunction or deliberate action. This exposure generally results in physical burns to the body, as human tissue, particularly the outer fat and muscle layers, has a similar composition to some foods that are typically cooked in microwave ovens and so experiences similar dielectric heating effects when exposed to microwave electromagnetic radiation.

=== Chemical exposure ===
Microwave-safe symbol

The use of unmarked plastics for microwave cooking raises the issue of plasticizers leaching into the food.

The plasticizers which received the most attention are bisphenol A (BPA) and phthalates, although it is unclear whether other plastic components present a toxicity risk. Other issues include melting and flammability. An alleged issue of release of dioxins into food has been dismissed as an intentional red herring distraction from actual safety issues.

Some current plastic containers and food wraps are specifically designed to resist radiation from microwaves. Products may use the term "microwave safe", may carry a microwave symbol (three lines of waves, one above the other) or simply provide instructions for proper microwave oven use. Any of these is an indication that a product is suitable for microwaving when used in accordance with the directions provided.

Plastic containers can release microplastics into food when heated in microwave ovens.

=== Uneven heating ===
Microwave ovens are frequently used for reheating leftover food, and bacterial contamination may not be repressed if the microwave oven is used improperly. If safe temperature is not reached, this can result in foodborne illness, as with other reheating methods. While microwave ovens can destroy bacteria as well as conventional ovens can, they cook rapidly and may not cook as evenly, similar to frying or grilling, leading to a risk of some food regions failing to reach recommended temperatures. Therefore, a standing period after cooking to allow temperatures in the food to equalize is recommended, as well as the use of a food thermometer to verify internal temperatures.

=== Interference ===
Microwave ovens, although shielded for safety purposes, still emit low levels of microwave radiation. This is not harmful to humans, but can sometimes cause interference to Wi-Fi and Bluetooth and other devices that communicate on the 2.45 GHz wavebands, particularly at close range. Conventional transformer ovens do not operate continuously over the main cycle, but can cause significant slowdowns for many metres around the oven, whereas inverter-based ovens can stop nearby networking entirely while operating.

== See also ==
- Countertop
- Electromagnetic reverberation chamber
- Induction cooker
- List of cooking appliances
- List of home appliances
- Microwave chemistry
- Peryton (astronomy)
- Robert V. Decareau
- Thelma Pressman
- Wall oven
